= Pediatric neurology =

Medical specialty dealing with disorders of the nervous system

- System: Nervous system
- Significant diseases: Epilepsy, seizures, headache, hydrocephalus, spina bifida, tumors, concussion, spinal cord injury
- Significant tests: Computed tomography scan, Magnetic Resonance Imaging, lumbar puncture, electroencephalography, blood tests
- Specialist: Pediatric neurologist

Pediatric neurology is the medical subfield of neurology focused on the diagnosis, treatment, and management of pathologies related to the central nervous system and peripheral nervous system in children.

While pediatric neurologists have many similarities to neurologists, the neurological disorders they treat can vary due to their focus on children. Pediatric neurologists treat and manage epilepsy, seizures, headaches, concussions, hydrocephalus, spinal bifida, neurological trauma, and more.

The field of pediatric neurology has many practical connections to neuroscience, the scientific study of the nervous system. Some pediatric neurologists may elect to conduct basic science research in neuroscience or conduct clinical research and clinical trials. Even though pediatric neurology is a non-surgical field, it has many connections to pediatric neurosurgery, which addresses surgical issues related to the treatment of the nervous system.

== Training ==
Pediatric neurologist
Occupation
- Names: Physician
- Occupation type: Profession
- Activity sectors: Medicine

Description
- Education required: M.D. or D.O. (US), M.B.B.S. (UK), D.M. (Doctorate of Medicine) (India), M.B. B.Ch. B.A.O. (Republic of Ireland)
- Fields of employment: Hospitals, Clinics

In the United States, pediatric neurologists must first complete a B.A. or B.S. degree while taking the required medical school pre-requisites. Following the completion of a bachelor's degree, students apply to a M.D. or D.O. program and complete a four year curriculum consisting of pre-clinical education and clinical rotations. Pediatric neurology residency requires the completion of two years of a pediatric residency. Physicians may either apply directly to a combined five year residency or complete two preliminary pediatric years followed by a separate three years of dedicated pediatric neurology training.

After the completion of residency, child neurologists will be board eligible through the American Board of Psychiatry and Neurology. Pediatric neurologists may also be board certified in pediatrics through the American Board of Pediatrics.

In Europe, many countries recognize pediatric neurology as a specialty, however the training varies. Some countries have a full pediatric neurology training that does not require preliminary years in pediatrics before entering. Other European countries only offer pediatric neurology training to physicians fully board certified in pediatrics. Similarly, some countries will offer pediatric neurology training only to physicians who have completed a board certification in adult neurology.

== See also ==
- American Academy of Neurology
- American Academy of Pediatrics
- American Board of Pediatrics
- American Board of Psychiatry and Neurology
- American Osteopathic Board of Neurology and Psychiatry
- List of women neuroscientists
