= American Osteopathic Board of Anesthesiology =

American medical professional association

- Abbreviation: AOBA
- Predecessor: AOBS (1940–1955)
- Formation: 1956
- Type: Professional
- Headquarters: Chicago, IL
- Coordinates: 41.89335°N 87.623616°W
- Chair: Neera Tewari, DO, FAOCA
- Vice-Chair: Vacant
- Immediate Past Chair: Nicholas Ford, DO, FAOCA
- Key people: Katrina Matthews, Certification Director
- Website: certification.osteopathic.org/anesthesiology/

The American Osteopathic Board of Anesthesiology (AOBA) is an organization that provides board certification to qualified Doctors of Osteopathic Medicine (D.O.) and non-osteopathic (MD and equivalent) physicians who specialize in the administration of anesthetic agents and perioperative medicine (anesthesiologists). The board is one of 16 medical specialty certifying boards of the American Osteopathic Association Bureau of Osteopathic Specialists approved by the American Osteopathic Association (AOA), and was established in 1956.

Since its inception, more than 1,200 physicians have achieved primary certification in anesthesiology.

== History ==
From June 26, 1940, until the creation of the AOBA, the American Osteopathic Board of Surgery (AOBS) certified osteopathic anesthesiologists. In 1949, a group of 36 osteopathic anesthesiologists met in Detroit, Michigan to form the American Society of Osteopathic Anesthesiologists (ASOA). The original six members of the ASOA Board of Governors were each certified in anesthesiology by the AOBS. In 1950, Crawford Esterline, DO, invited all osteopathic anesthesiologists to join the ASOA, the "foundation for a separate college and certifying board in the future."

In 1952, the American Osteopathic College of Anesthesiologists (AOCA) received recognition by the American Osteopathic Association as a separate college; the records and assets of the ASOA were transferred to the fledgling college. During the 1955 AOCA meeting in Washington, DC, on motion by B.H. Traven, DO, and, by unanimous vote of the members present, the Board of Governors moved to "request a separate Board of Certification in Anesthesiology."

== Board certification ==
Initial certification is available to osteopathic and other anesthesiologists who have completed an ACGME-accredited residency in anesthesiology, one year of practice, and successful completion of written exams, oral exams, and clinical exams.

Board-certified anesthesiologists (diplomates of the AOBA) must participate in Osteopathic Continuous Certification on an ongoing basis to avoid expiration of their board-certified status.

Effective June 1, 2019, all AOA specialty certifying boards implemented an updated continuous certification process for osteopathic physicians, called “(OCC)”, and are required to publish the requirements for OCC in their basic documents. The following components comprise the updated OCC process:

- Component 1: Licensure. AOA board-certified physicians must hold a valid, active license to practice medicine in one of the 50 states or Canada.
- Component 2: Lifelong Learning/Continuing Medical Education. A minimum of 75 CME credits in the specialty area of certification during each 3-year cycle. Of these 75 specialty CME credits, 18 must be AOA Category 1-A or 1-B CME. The remaining 57 hours will accept broad specialty CME.
- Component 3: Cognitive Assessment: AOBA board-certified physicians must complete the online cognitive assessment annually after entry into the Longitudinal Assessment process to maintain compliance with OCC.
- Component 4: Practice Performance Assessment and Improvement. Attestation of participation in quality improvement activities. Physicians may view the Attestation Form by using their AOA credentials to log in to the AOA Physician Portal on the AOA website.

Diplomates of the AOBA may also receive Subspecialty Certification in Critical Care Medicine, Pain Management, and Pediatric Anesthesiology. The Subspecialty Certification must be maintained through the Osteopathic Continuous Certification every 10 years.

Effective July 1, 2020, allopathic (MD) physicians may apply for AOBA certification.

== See also ==
- American Board of Anesthesiology
- American Osteopathic Association Bureau of Osteopathic Specialists
- American Board of Medical Specialties
- Accreditation Council for Graduate Medical Education
