= Reproductive endocrinology and infertility =

Surgical subspecialty of obstetrics and gynecology

Reproductive Endocrinologist
Occupation
- Names: Physician; Surgeon
- Occupation type: Specialty
- Activity sectors: Medicine, Surgery

Description
- Education required: Doctor of Medicine (M.D.); Doctor of Osteopathic medicine (D.O.); Bachelor of Medicine, Bachelor of Surgery (M.B.B.S.); Bachelor of Medicine, Bachelor of Surgery (MBChB)
- Fields of employment: Hospitals, Clinics

Reproductive endocrinology and infertility (REI) is a surgical subspecialty of obstetrics and gynecology that trains physicians in reproductive medicine addressing hormonal functioning as it pertains to reproduction as well as the issue of infertility. While most REI specialists primarily focus on the treatment of infertility, reproductive endocrinologists are trained to also test and treat hormonal dysfunctions in females and males outside infertility. Reproductive endocrinologists have specialty training (residency) in obstetrics and gynecology (ob-gyn) before they undergo sub-specialty training (fellowship) in REI.

Reproductive surgery is a related specialty, where a physician in ob-gyn or urology further specializes to operate on anatomical disorders that affect fertility.

== Certification ==
In a number of countries, the pathway to become a subspecialist in REI is regulated. Thus, in the United States, for instance, the American Board of Obstetrics and Gynecology (ABOG) and American Osteopathic Board of Obstetrics and Gynecology set the standards for subspecialists to become certified. After four years of training in Obstetrics and Gynecology, a three-year approved fellowship needs to be successfully completed. Then, to become board certified in reproductive endocrinology and infertility, one must first complete board certification in obstetrics and gynecology (written and oral exams), and then certify in reproductive endocrinology and infertility (written and oral exams).

In the United States, fellowship in reproductive endocrinology and infertility usually takes three years, and is offered in 40 centers across the country as of 2013.

In the European Union, the European Board and College of Obstetrics and Gynaecology (EBCOG) has accreditation centers for a subspecialist training program in reproductive medicine at 4 centers across the EU as of 2012.

In Australia and New Zealand, a training program in reproductive endocrinology and infertility takes three years, and is offered in 15 centers across the two countries.

In India, Assisted Reproductive Technology bill has been passed in parliament. This bill mandates gyncelogists or andrologists to have three years of experience in recognized ART centers to conduct procedures such as IVF, PGT.

== Societies ==
Reproductive endocrinologists Certified by ACOG often belong to a specific medical society named Society for Reproductive Endocrinology and Infertility (SREI). As a condition of full membership, medical practitioners must be ACOG-certified in the reproductive endocrinology and infertility subspecialty.

== Journals ==
- Human Reproduction is published on behalf of the European Society of Human Reproduction and Embryology. According to SCImago Journal Rank, its review journal Human Reproduction Update was the highest ranking journal in obstetrics and gynecology in 2008.
- Reproduction is published on behalf of the Society for Reproduction and Fertility in the United Kingdom.
- Reproductive Biology and Endocrinology (RB&E) is an online open access journal published by BioMed Central. It deals with both veterinary and human reproductive medicine.
- Fertility and Sterility is a monthly journal from the American Society for Reproductive Medicine

Also, many academic journals in obstetrics and gynaecology dedicate many articles to reproductive endocrinology and infertility.

== See also ==
- Hypothalamic-pituitary-gonadal axis
- Endocrinology of reproduction
