= American Osteopathic Board of Physical Medicine and Rehabilitation =

- Abbreviation: AOBPMR
- Formation: 1954
- Type: Professional
- Headquarters: Chicago, IL
- Coordinates: 41.8942°N 87.61902°W
- Chair: John L. Hart, DO
- Vice-Chair: Jim R. Sylvain, DO
- Secretary-Treasurer: J. Michael Wieting, DO, MEd.
- Website: aobpmr.org
- Formerly called: American Osteopathic Board of Rehabilitation Medicine

The American Osteopathic Board of Physical Medicine and Rehabilitation (AOBPMR) is an organization that provides board certification to qualified Doctors of Osteopathic Medicine (D.O.) who specialize in the treatment of patients with physical impairments or disabilities (physiatrists). The board is one of 18 medical specialty certifying boards of the American Osteopathic Association Bureau of Osteopathic Specialists approved by the American Osteopathic Association (AOA), and was established in 1954. The AOBPMR is one of two certifying boards for physiatrists in the United States. The other certifying authority is the American Board of Physical Medicine and Rehabilitation, a member board of the American Board of Medical Specialties. As of 2011, 220 osteopathic physiatrists held active certification with the AOBPMR.

== Board certification ==
To become board certified in physical medicine and rehabilitation, candidates must have completed an AOA-approved residency in physical medicine and rehabilitation and either one year of practice as a licensed physiatrist or one year of a physical medicine and rehabilitation fellowship following the completion of residency. Additionally, candidates must have completed the required oral and written examinations. Since 2004, board-certified osteopathic physiatrists must renew their certification every ten years to avoid expiration of their board-certified status.

Diplomates of the AOBPMR may also receive Certification of Added Qualifications (CAQ) in Hospice and Palliative Medicine and sports medicine after receiving additional training.

== See also ==
- American Osteopathic Association Bureau of Osteopathic Specialists
- Physical medicine and rehabilitation
- Physical Medicine and Rehabilitation Residency Programs in the United States
