= American Osteopathic Board of Orthopedic Surgery =

American medical professional association

- Abbreviation: AOBOS
- Formation: 1978
- Type: Professional
- Headquarters: Chicago, IL
- Chair: M. Sean O'Brien, DO
- Vice Chair: John Schlechter, DO
- Certification Director: Jen Greene
- Website: aobos.org

The American Osteopathic Board of Orthopedic Surgery (AOBOS) is an organization that provides board certification to qualified Doctors of Osteopathic Medicine (DO) and non-osteopathic (MD and equivalent) physicians who specialize in the medical and surgical treatment of disorders of the musculoskeletal system (orthopedic surgeons). The board is one of 16 medical specialty certifying boards of the American Osteopathic Association Bureau of Osteopathic Specialists approved by the American Osteopathic Association (AOA), and was originally a subdivision of the American Osteopathic Board of Surgery until it became an independent board in 1978. Additionally, diplomates of the American Osteopathic Board of Orthopedic Surgery are eligible for membership in the American Osteopathic Academy of Orthopedics and the American Academy of Orthopaedic Surgeons.

== Board certification ==
To become board certified in orthopedic surgery, candidates must have completed an ACGME-accredited residency in orthopedic surgery and one year of practice following the completion of residency. Additionally, candidates must have performed at least 100 major orthopedic surgeries in the six months preceding application for board certification and complete the required written and clinical exams. Since 2023, board certified osteopathic orthopedic surgeons complete the Osteopathic Continuous Certification (OCC) components, including annual Longitudinal Assessment, to maintain active board certification status.

Board certified osteopathic orthopedic surgeons may also receive Certification of Added Qualifications (CAQ) in Orthopedic Sports Medicine and Hand Surgery. Orthopedic surgeons holding subspecialty certification in Hand Surgery complete the Osteopathic Continuous Certification (OCC) components, including a recertification examination completed every ten years. Orthopedic surgeons holding subspecialty certification in Orthopedic Sports Medicine must complete the Osteopathic Continuous Certification (OCC) components, including annual Longitudinal Assessment.

== See also ==
- American Osteopathic Association Bureau of Osteopathic Specialists
