= American Osteopathic Board of Neurology and Psychiatry =

American medical professional association

- Abbreviation: AOBNP
- Formation: 1941
- Type: Professional association
- Headquarters: Chicago, IL
- Location: United States
- Coordinates: 33.3312°N 111.7556°W
- Official language: English
- Chair: Shailesh Rajguru, DO, FACN
- Vice Chair: Nicole Polashenski, DO
- Immediate Past Chair: Furhut Janssen, DO, FACN
- Key people: Katrina Matthews, Certification Director
- Website: American Osteopathic Board of Neurology & Psychiatry

The American Osteopathic Board of Neurology and Psychiatry (AOBNP) is an organization that provides board certification to qualified Doctors of Osteopathic Medicine (D.O.) and non-osteopathic (MD and equivalent) physicians who specialize in disorders of the nervous system (neurologists) and to qualified Doctors of Osteopathic Medicine and physicians who specialize in the diagnosis and treatment of mental disorders (psychiatrists).

The board is one of 16 medical specialty certifying boards of the American Osteopathic Association Bureau of Osteopathic Specialists (AOABOS) of the American Osteopathic Association (AOA). Established in 1941, the AOBNP is responsible for examining physicians who have completed an ACGME-accredited residency in neurology and/or psychiatry. Since its inception, over 630 physicians have achieved primary certification in psychiatry and 400 in neurology, along with physicians holding subspecialty certifications.

The AOBNP is one of two certifying boards for neurologists and psychiatrists in the United States. The other certifying authority is the American Board of Psychiatry and Neurology, Inc. (ABPN), a member board of the American Board of Medical Specialties.

== Organization ==
There are eight elected members of the AOBNP. Each member is an AOA board-certified physician, certified through the AOBNP. Membership includes a representative from each area of neurology (4) and psychiatry (4), as well as representation from the board's subspecialties and from each of the United States' time zones whenever possible.

== Board certification ==
Initial certification is available to osteopathic and other neurologists and psychiatrists who have completed an ACGME-accredited residency in neurology or psychiatry and have completed the written exam.

Board-certified neurologists and psychiatrists (diplomates of the AOBNP) must participate in Osteopathic Continuous Certification on an ongoing basis to avoid expiration of their board-certified status.

Effective June 1, 2019, all AOA specialty certifying boards implemented an updated continuous certification process for osteopathic physicians, called “(OCC)”, and are required to publish the requirements for OCC in their basic documents. The following components comprise the updated OCC process:

- Component 1: Licensure. AOA board-certified physicians must hold a valid, active license to practice medicine in one of the 50 states or Canada.
- Component 2: Lifelong Learning/Continuing Medical Education. A minimum of 75 CME credits in the specialty area of certification during each 3-year cycle. Of these 75 specialty CME credits, 18 must be AOA Category 1-A. The remaining 57 hours will accept broad specialty CME.
- Component 3: Cognitive Assessment: AOBA board-certified physicians must complete the online cognitive assessment annually after entry into the Longitudinal Assessment process to maintain compliance with OCC.
- Component 4: Practice Performance Assessment and Improvement. Attestation of participation in quality improvement activities. Physicians may use their AOA credentials to log in to view the attestation form by logging in to the AOA Physician Portal on the AOA website.

Diplomates of the AOBNP may also receive Subspecialty Certification or Certification of Special Qualifications in the following areas:

- Child and Adolescent Psychiatry
- Addiction Medicine
- Neurophysiology
- Geriatric Psychiatry
- Hospice and Palliative Medicine
- Sleep Medicine

Effective July 1, 2020, allopathic (MD) physicians may apply for AOBNP certification.

== See also ==
- AOA Bureau of Osteopathic Specialists
- American Board of Psychiatry and Neurology
