= American Academy of Osteopathy =

US health education organization

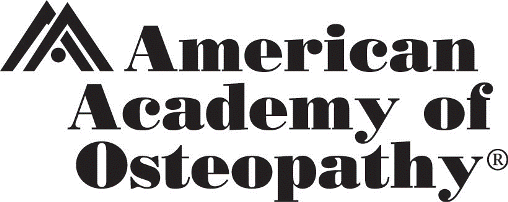
- Abbreviation: AAO
- Formation: 1937
- Type: Professional association
- Headquarters: Indianapolis, IN
- Location: United States
- Official language: English
- President: Paul R. Rennie, DO, FAAO
- President-Elect: Richard G. Schuster, DO
- Secretary/Treasurer: Judith A. O'Connell, DO, FAAO
- Immediate Past President: Kendi L. Hensel, DO, PhD, FAAO
- Website: www.academyofosteopathy.org
- Formerly called: Academy of Applied Osteopathy

The American Academy of Osteopathy (AAO) is a non-profit organization for osteopathic medical education. Members include osteopathic physicians and medical students, supporters and affiliates, sponsors, and international members.

The mission of the AAO is to teach, advocate, and research the science, art, and philosophy of osteopathic medicine, emphasizing the integration of osteopathic principles, practice, and manipulative treatment in patient care.

== Mission ==
The AAO's mission is to assist osteopathic medical professionals to:

1. Acquire a better understanding of osteopathic principles, theories, and practice to include:

a. helping students attain a maximum proficiency in osteopathic structural diagnosis and treatment
b. fostering a clear concept of clinical application of osteopathy in health and disease

2. Improve public awareness of osteopathic medicine so that the community may better take advantage of the benefits provided by the complete health care concept of osteopathic medicine.

== Membership in the American Academy of Osteopathy ==
AAO members consist of osteopathic physicians, including but not limited to those specializing in osteopathic manipulative treatment; osteopathic medical students; residents; associates who graduated from accredited medical or dental schools; international affiliates, or osteopaths trained outside the U.S.; and supporters.

== Fellow of the American Academy of Osteopathy ==
The Fellow of the American Academy of Osteopathy is an earned post-graduate degree awarded to eligible physicians demonstrating a commitment to osteopathic principles and practice. Requirements include AAO membership, American Osteopathic Association board certification, an interview, publications, etc.

== The AAO Journal ==
Printed quarterly, The AAO Journal is the official peer-reviewed publication of the American Academy of Osteopathy. Members of the AAO receive a complimentary subscription to the AAOJ. Subscriptions for non-members are available for a fee.

Authors should review the AAOJ Instructions for Contributors before submitting their manuscripts.

== See also ==
- American Osteopathic Association
- American Osteopathic Board of Neuromusculoskeletal Medicine
