= Hospice and palliative medicine =

Support provided to sick or dying people

Palliative Medicine Physician
Occupation
- Occupation type: Specialty
- Activity sectors: Medicine

Description
- Education required: Doctor of Medicine (M.D.); Bachelor of Medicine, Bachelor of Surgery (M.B.B.S.); (US only) Doctor of Osteopathic medicine (D.O.)
- Fields of employment: Hospitals, Clinics

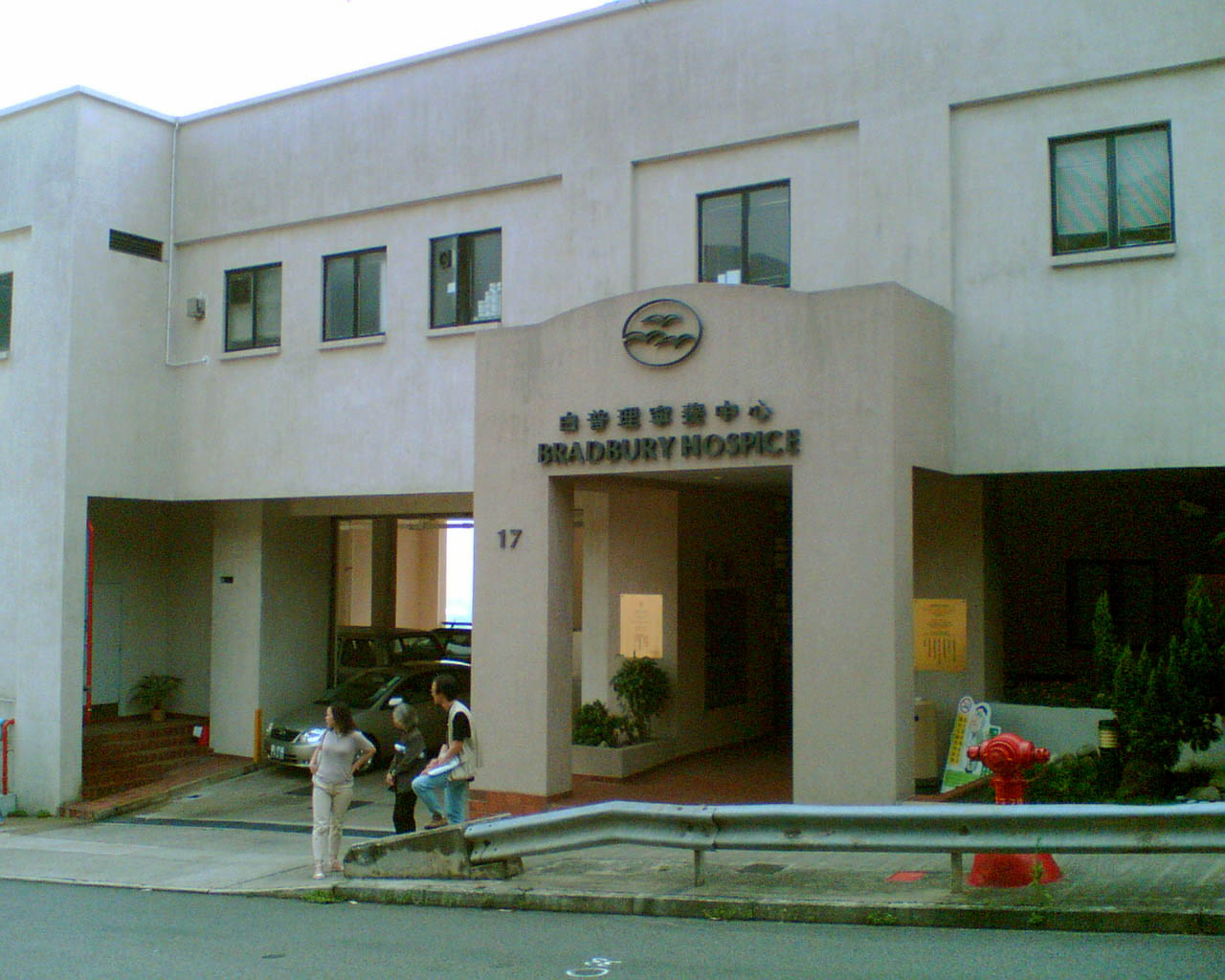
Bradbury Hospice, Hong Kong's first independent, specialist-built hospice

In 2006, hospice and palliative medicine was officially recognized by the American Board of Medical Specialties, and is co-sponsored by the American Boards of

- Internal Medicine
- Anesthesiology
- Family Medicine
- Physical Medicine and Rehabilitation
- Psychiatry and Neurology
- Surgery
- Pediatrics
- Emergency Medicine
- Radiology
- Obstetrics and Gynecology

Physicians who complete a residency in one of the co-sponsoring specialties are then eligible for further training in an ACGME-approved Hospice and Palliative Medicine fellowship program, after which they must pass the official examination to be board-certified in the subspecialty.

In 2007, the American Osteopathic Association Bureau of Osteopathic Specialists approved a Certificate of Added Qualifications (CAQ) in hospice and palliative medicine. By 2012 participants are the American Osteopathic Boards of

- Internal Medicine
- Family Medicine
- Neurology and Psychiatry
- Physical Medicine and Rehabilitation.

Candidates are eligible for CAQ certification after achieving board-certification following an American Osteopathic Association-approved residency.

== Etymology and historical development ==
Hospice comes from the Latin word hospitum which means hospitality. Initially as a form of lodging for the sick, hospice refers to holistic end of life care. The word palliate comes from the Latin word "pallium", which means "cloak"—to palliate is to cloak, or cover up, the symptoms of an illness without curing it. Palliative care got its start as hospice care delivered largely by caregivers at religious institutions. The first formal hospice was founded in 1948 by the British physician Dame Cicely Saunders in order to care for patients with terminal illnesses. She defined key physical, emotional, social, and spiritual dimensions of distress in her work. She also developed the first hospice care as well in the US in 1974 - Connecticut Hospice. The National Hospice Organization (NHO) was established in 1978. By 1982, the US government began funding their work via the Medicare Hospice Benefit. In the United States, the Institute of medicine published a report, "Approaching Death: improving care at the end of life" (M.I. Field, and C.K. Kassel) in 1997. This described vast deficiencies in end-of-life care, which prompted support from the Robert Wood Johnson Foundation and the George Soros' Open Society Institute for faculty scholars in this area and a NIH State of the Science conferences. In 2004, Clinical practice guidelines for Quality Palliative Care were released, which expanded palliative care's role beyond dying patients to those with life-limiting illness. By 2006, the American Board of Medical Specialties and the Accreditation Council for Graduate Medical Education recognized the subspecialty of Hospice and Palliative Medicine, and by 2008, there were over 3000 members of the American Academy of Hospice and Palliative Medicine. Today, the field uses interdisciplinary treatment aiming to maintain quality of life while balancing appropriate therapies.

== Role of hospice and palliative care physicians ==
Physicians in this subspecialty have advanced knowledge and skills to prevent and relieve the suffering experienced by patients with life-limiting, life-threatening and terminal illnesses. This specialist has expertise in the assessment of patients with advanced disease and catastrophic injury, the relief of distressing symptoms, the coordination of interdisciplinary patient and family-centered care in diverse settings, the use of specialized care systems including hospice, the management of the imminently dying patient; and legal and ethical decision making in end-of-life care. They work with an interdisciplinary hospice or palliative care team to maximize quality of life while addressing physical, psychological, social and spiritual needs of both patients and family members throughout the course of the disease, including through the dying process and subsequent bereavement. This care can occur within or outside of a formal hospice or palliative care team.

== Education and training of hospice and palliative care physicians ==
Physicians must graduate from an accredited medical school. Medical schools may be accredited by either the liaison committee on medical education (LCME) or the American Osteopathic Associations Commission on Osteopathic College Accreditation (AOACOC). Medical school is generally 4 years of training. After completion of medical school, individuals must complete a residency accredited by either the American Committee on Graduate Medical Education (ACGME) or the American Osteopathic Association (AOA) in any number of specialties. Some main specialties include:

- anesthesiology
- emergency medicine
- family medicine
- internal medicine
- obstetrics and gynecology
- pediatrics
- physical medicine and rehabilitation
- psychiatry and neurology
- surgery
- radiology

After completion of residency, which can generally last from 3 to 7 years, individuals must complete at least 12 months of fellowship in Hospice and Palliative medicine in order to sit for board certification examinations (see below). As of 2021, there are 156 recognized fellowship programs in Hospice and Palliative Medicine.

== Certification of specialists ==
The American Academy of Hospice and Palliative Medicine (AAHPM) is the leading professional organization for physicians subspecializing in hospice and palliative medicine in North America. The International Association for Hospice and Palliative Care is the major professional organization devoted to the global spread of hospice and palliative medicine.

The American Board of Internal Medicine administers the initial board certification exam for allopathic physicians seeking certification in hospice and palliative medicine. Exams are offered during the fall of even numbered years.

The American Osteopathic Association administers the initial board certification exam for osteopathic physicians seeking certification in hospice and palliative medicine. Physicians have the option of 5 Boards to obtain the Certificate of Added Qualification (CAQ) for the specialty. Exams are offered every year.

== See also ==
- Hospice care in the United States
- Palliative care
