= New Jersey's Affidavit of Merit Statute =

1995 New Jersey state law

- Territorial extent: New Jersey
- Enacted: June 29, 1995
- Status: In force

New Jersey’s Affidavit of Merit Statute (NJ Rev Stat § 2A:53A-27 (2013)) was signed into law in 1995. The statute states that if a person sues for injury, death, or property damage because of a professional's mistake or carelessness, they must provide a special letter from an expert within 60 days after the other side responds to their lawsuit. This affidavit must indicate that the professional had some duty of care and there is a reasonable chance the defendant's performance or actions did not meet the expected professional standards.

If justified, the court may allow a one-time extension of up to 60 days for filing this affidavit. If the defendant is a specialist, as in medical malpractice cases, the expert witness must also be a specialist or subspecialist recognized by the American Board of Medical Specialties or the American Osteopathic Association in the same specialty or subspecialty as the defendant. The expert must have also devoted the majority of their professional time in the year before the incident either to the active clinical practice of that specialty/subspecialty or to instruct students in an accredited program in that specialty/subspecialty. In non-medical cases, the affiant must be a licensed professional with at least five years of substantial experience in the relevant field or specialty and must not have any financial stake in the lawsuit's outcome, although they can still serve as an expert witness.

The goal of the Affidavit of Merit statute is to “weed out” frivolous and baseless legal claims against certain professionals. If a plaintiff fails to provide an affidavit of merit, the case is dismissed with prejudice for noncompliance because there was a failure to state a cause of action. However, there is an exception to the rule; in some cases, the breached duty of a licensed professional can sometimes be so obvious to anyone of average intelligence that a court may find that an affidavit of merit is not needed. Nevertheless, courts often note that this exception only applies in rare cases.

== History ==
The affidavit of merit statute was enacted on June 29, 1995, and was designed and intended to introduce common sense and equity into New Jersey’s litigation system. The Statute has seen changes over the years. In 2021 in the case, Yagnik v. Premium Outlet Partners and Pennoni Associates, the New Jersey Appellate Division ultimately concluded that a court could make an exception to the statute’s timelines for substantial compliance and other extraordinary circumstances.

Originally, the only licensed professionals the State required an affidavit of merit for were dentists, physicians, podiatrists, chiropractors, registered nurses, and certain healthcare facilities. In 2001, pharmacists, physical therapists, and midwives were added. As used in this act, "licensed person" means any person who is licensed as:

- an accountant;
- an architect;
- an attorney admitted to practice law in New Jersey;
- a dentist;
- an engineer;
- a physician in the practice of medicine or surgery;
- a podiatrist;
- a chiropractor;
- a registered professional nurse;
- a health care facility;
- a physical therapist;
- a land surveyor;
- a registered pharmacist;
- a veterinarian.;
- an insurance producer;
- a certified midwife, certified professional midwife, or certified nurse midwife; and
- a licensed site remediation professional
