= American Osteopathic Board of Surgery =

US certification organization

- Abbreviation: AOBS
- Formation: 1940
- Type: Professional
- Headquarters: Huber Heights, OH
- Coordinates: 39.8408°N 84.1379°W
- Chairman: David Dellinger, D.O., FACOS
- Vice Chairman: Lauren Donatelli-Seyler, D.O., FACOS, FACS
- Secretary: Christopher Pfeifer, D.O., FACOS, FACS
- Website: aobs.org

The American Osteopathic Board of Surgery (AOBS) is an organization that provides board certification to qualified Doctors of Osteopathic Medicine (D.O.) who specialize in the use of surgery to aid in the diagnosis and treatment of disease (surgeons). The board is one 18 medical specialty certifying boards of the American Osteopathic Association Bureau of Osteopathic Specialists approved by the American Osteopathic Association (AOA). As of 2011, 1,279 osteopathic physicians held active certification with the AOBS. The AOBS is one of two certifying boards for surgeons in the United States; the other certifying board is the American Board of Surgery of the American Board of Medical Specialties. Fellows of the AOBS are eligible for full membership in major U.S. surgical societies such as the American College of Surgeons (ACS) and the Society of Thoracic Surgeons. Board certified surgeons of the AOBS are also eligible for membership in the American Society for Metabolic & Bariatric Surgery.

== Board certification ==
Initial certification is available to osteopathic physicians who have completed an AOA-approved surgical residency and completed the required written and oral exams.

Recertification became mandatory in 1997. Before this time, the initial board certification was permanent, and recertification was not required. Since 1997, diplomates of the American Osteopathic Board of Surgery require osteopathic surgeons to renew their certification every ten years to avoid expiration of their board-certified status.

Osteopathic surgeons may also receive primary board certification in the following areas:

- General Surgery
- Neurological Surgery
- Plastic & Reconstructive Surgery
- Thoracic Cardiovascular Surgery
- Urological Surgery
- General Vascular Surgery

Osteopathic surgeons may also receive Certification of Added Qualifications in surgical critical care. The Certification of Added Qualifications must be maintained through the process of recertification every 10 years.

For an osteopathic physician to be board-certified in any specialty, they must be AOA members, pay certification fees, and complete at least 120 hours of continuing medical education in three years.

== See also ==
- AOA Bureau of Osteopathic Specialists
- American Board of Surgery
