= I. Michael Leitman =

American surgeon and medical educator

- Born: 1959 (age 66–67); Philadelphia, PA, USA
- Education: M.D. Boston University School of Medicine, 1985
- Alma mater: Boston University
- Occupations: Dean for Graduate Medical Education at the Icahn School of Medicine at Mount Sinai Professor, Leni and Peter W. May Department of Medical Education, Professor, Department of Surgery
- Employer: Icahn School of Medicine at Mount Sinai
- Website: http://www.mountsinai.org/profiles/i-michael-leitman

I. Michael Leitman is an American surgeon and medical educator. He is Professor of Surgery and Medical Education and Dean for Graduate Medical Education at the Icahn School of Medicine at Mount Sinai. He previously held the position of Chairman of the Department of Surgery at Mount Sinai Beth Israel in New York City.

== Education ==
A native of Philadelphia, Leitman received both his bachelor's degree and Medical Degree from Boston University. After medical school, Leitman moved to New York City to receive his training in General Surgery at New York Presbyterian-Weill Cornell and completed his fellowship in Surgical Critical Care at North Shore University Hospital-Weill Cornell. While at Cornell, Leitman was under the tutelage of American surgical pioneer G. Tom Shires.

== Career ==
As an innovator of minimally invasive techniques for the treatment of abdominal conditions, Leitman is also known for his research on the outcomes following the surgical treatment of breast cancer, colon cancer, lower gastrointestinal hemorrhage, gallbladder disease and morbid obesity.

For more than 30 years, Dr. Leitman has served as a medical educator. In addition to his current role as Professor of Medical Education at the Icahn School of Medicine at Mount Sinai, Dr. Leitman has also served as a professor of Clinical Surgery at the Albert Einstein College of Medicine of Yeshiva University in New York City.

== Awards and honors ==
A fellow of the New York Academy of Medicine and the Society of Surgical Oncology, Dr. Leitman has been recognized as a Harold C. Case Scholar and Commonwealth Scholar. Dr. Leitman is also a fellow of the American College of Surgeons, and a member of the American Board of Colon and Rectal Surgery, American Board of Surgery and American Society of Clinical Oncology.

In addition, he was elected to Phi Beta Kappa and Alpha Omega Alpha honor societies. The winner of the 2008 Murry G. Fischer Distinguished Educator Award, in 2013, Dr. Leitman is included in New York Magazine's (Castle Connolly) lists of "Top Doctors." In 2022, he was the recipient of the Mount Sinai Faculty Council Lifetime Achievement Award and he was awarded the Jacobi Medallion in 2023. In 2023, Dr. Leitman became the 106th President of the New York Surgical Society (founded in 1879). He received the prestigious Parker J. Palmer Courage to Lead Award from the Accreditation Council for Graduate Medical Education.

== Publications (partial list) ==
- Leitman IM, Paull DE, Barie PS, Isom OW, and Shires GT (1987). "Intra-abdominal Complications of Cardiopulmonary Bypass Operations". Surgery Gynecology and Obstetrics. 165 (3): 251–254. PMID 3498228.
- Leitman IM, Paull DE, Barie PS, Isom OW, and Shires GT (1989). "Evaluation and Management of Massive Lower Gastrointestinal Hemorrhage". Annals of Surgery. 209 (2): 175–180. doi:10.1097/00000658-198902000-00007. PMC 1493912. PMID 2783842.
- Leitman IM (1991). "The Evolution of Surgery at The New York Hospital". Bulletin of the New York Academy of Medicine. 67 (5): 475–500. PMC 1807983. PMID 1933072.
- Leitman, IM Sullivan J, Brams D, DeCosse, JJ (1989). "Multivariate Analysis of The Initial Surgical Management of Obstructing Carcinoma of The Colon". Surgery Gynecology and Obstetrics. 174 (6): 513–518. PMID 1595029.
- Leitman IM, Fisher ML, McKinley MJ, Rothman R, Ward RJ, Reiner DS, Tortolani AJ (1993). "The Evaluation and Management of Known or Suspected Common Bile Duct Stones in the Era of Minimal Access Surgery". Surgery Gynecology and Obstetrics. 176 (6): 527–533. PMID 8322123.
- Birmingham KL, Feigenbaum N, Leitman IM, Tortoloni AJ (1996). "Critical Comparison of Diagnostic Laparoscopy and Appendectomy versus Open Appendectomy for the Evaluation of Acute Right Lower Quadrant Pain". Current Surgery. 53: 231–234.
- Adusumilli PS, Leitman IM, Ben Porat L, Roesler D (2004). "The Prevalence and Predictors of Herbal Medicine Use in Surgical Patients". Journal of the American College of Surgeons. 198 (4): 583–590. doi:10.1016/j.jamcollsurg.2003.11.019. PMID 15051013.
- Taylor JD, Leitman IM, Hon P, Horowitz M, Panagopoulos G (2006). "Outcome and complications of gastric bypass surgery in super-super obesity versus morbid obesity". Obesity Surgery. 16 (1): 16–18. doi:10.1381/096089206775222087. PMID 16417751. S2CID 22555926.
- Taylor JD, Leitman IM, Hon P, Horowitz M, Panagopoulos G (2006). "Is routine cholecystectomy necessary at the time of roux-en-y gastric bypass for morbid obesity?". Obesity Surgery. 16 (6): 759–761. doi:10.1381/096089206777346781. PMID 16756738. S2CID 25856013.
- Taylor JD, Leitman IM, Rosser JC, Davis B, Goodman EC (2006). "Does the Position of the Alimentary Limb in Roux-en-Y Gastric Bypass Surgery Make a Difference?". Gastrointestinal Surgery. 10 (10): 1397–1399. doi:10.1016/j.gassur.2006.09.007. PMID 17175460. S2CID 35380966.
- Avgerinos D, Leitman IM, Martinez RE, Liao EP (2006). "Prevalence of Vitamin D Deficiency and Secondary Hyperparathyroidism in a Population of Obese Adults undergoing Gastric Bypass Surgery". Journal of the American College of Surgeons. 205 (2): 294–297. doi:10.1016/j.jamcollsurg.2007.02.078. PMID 17660076.
- Avgerinos A, Laguna OH, Leitman IM, Lo AY (2008). "Evolving management of iatrogenic colonoscopic perforations". J Gastrointest Surg. 12 (10): 1783–1790. doi:10.1007/s11605-008-0631-7. PMID 18683006. S2CID 20468167.
- Clarke-Pearson EM, Jacobson AF, Boolbol SK, Leitman IM, Friedmann P, Lavarias V, Feldman SM (2009). "Quality Assurance Initiative at One Institution for Minimally Invasive Breast Biopsy as the Initial Diagnostic Technique". Journal of the American College of Surgeons. 208 (1): 75–79. doi:10.1016/j.jamcollsurg.2008.09.008. PMID 19228506.
- Llaguna D, Avgerinos J, Martz Lugo J, Leitman IM, Abbadessa B (2010). "Incidence and risk factors for the development of incisional hernia following elective laparoscopic versus open colon resections". American Journal of Surgery. 200 (2): 265–269. doi:10.1016/j.amjsurg.2009.08.044. PMID 20122681.
- Leitman IM, Sivaprasad L, Lipp M, Levin R, Bernard D, Friedmann P, Shulkin DJ (2010). "Quality and Financial Outcomes from Gainsharing for Inpatient Admissions: A Three-Year Experience" (PDF). Journal of Hospital Medicine. 5 (9): 501–507. doi:10.1002/jhm.788. PMID 20717892.
- Eiref SD, Leitman IM, Riley W (2012). "Hand Sanitizer Dispensers and Associated Hospital Acquired Infections - Friend or Fomite?". Surgical Infections. 13 (2): 1–4. doi:10.1089/sur.2011.049. PMID 22568918.
- Leitman IM, Suzuki K, Wengrofsky AJ, Menashe E, Poplawski M, Woo KM, Geller CM, Lucido D, Bernik T, Zeifer B, Patton B (2013). "Early Recognition of Acute Thoracic Aortic Dissection and Aneurysm". World Journal of Emergency Surgery. 8 (1): 47. doi:10.1186/1749-7922-8-47. PMC 3874654. PMID 24499618.
- Farivar BS, Flannagan M, Leitman IM (2014). "General Surgery Residents' Perception of Robot-Assisted Procedures During Surgical Training". J Surg Educ. 72 (2): 259–261. doi:10.1016/j.jsurg.2014.09.008. PMID 25451717.
- Edwards S, Leitman IM, Wengrofsky AJ, Giddins MJ, Mills CB, Fukuhara S, Cassaro S (2016). "Identifying Factors and Techniques to Decrease the Positive Margin Rate in Partial Mastectomies: Have We Missed the Mark?". The Breast Journal. 22 (3): 303–9. doi:10.1111/tbj.12573. PMID 26854189. S2CID 33596166.
- Suzuki K, Bower M, Cassaro S, Patel RI, Karpeh MS, Leitman IM (2015). "Tube Cholecystostomy Before Cholecystectomy for the Treatment of Acute Cholecystitis". Journal of the Society of Laparoendoscopic Surgeons. 19 (1): 200. doi:10.4293/JSLS.2014.00200. PMC 4376213. PMID 25848180.
- Lifting the Cap: Bills Seek More Medicare-Supported Residencies
