= Ruth Rissing-van Saan =

German judge

Ruth Rissing-van Saan (born 25 January 1946 in Neuss) is a German lawyer and was chair judge at the Federal Court of Justice. She worked as a judge on probation at the district court Bochum, and she was appointed in 1975 as a judge for life. In 1988, she was appointed judge at the Federal Court of Justice. In 2002, she took over the chairmanship of the 2nd Criminal Senate. Rissing-van Saan was awarded the Heinrich Pera Prize in December 2017 in Halle (Saale) for her decisive participation in the case-law that is groundbreaking for palliative medicine (judgment on "justified termination of treatment") (BGHSt 55, 191).

== Personal life ==
Ruth Rissing-van Saan went to a Catholic monastery school in Neuss. In 1966 she began her studies of law at the Ruhr-Universität Bochum. After her studies, Rissing-van Saan worked as an assessor in Bochum until 1975.
