= American Osteopathic Board of Pediatrics =

- Abbreviation: AOBP
- Formation: 1940
- Type: Professional
- Headquarters: Chicago, IL
- Coordinates: 41.8933°N 87.62398°W
- Chairman: Arlen Foulks, DO
- Vice Chairman: Nathanel Brady, D.O.
- Secretary-Treasurer: Mark Gabay, D.O.
- Website: aobp.org

The American Osteopathic Board of Pediatrics (AOBP) is an organization that provides board certification to qualified Doctors of Osteopathic Medicine (D.O.) who specialize in the diagnosis and treatment of medical diseases in infants, children, and adolescents (pediatricians). The board is one 18 medical specialty certifying boards of the American Osteopathic Association Bureau of Osteopathic Specialists approved by the American Osteopathic Association (AOA), and was established in 1940. Certification in pediatrics has grown to over 1,000 diplomates over the last decade. In 2011, 477 osteopathic pediatricians held active certification with the AOBP. With single accreditation in place both osteopathic and allopathic residency training candidates are eligible to examine for certification with the American Osteopathic Board of Pediatrics.

== Board certification ==
Osteopathic and Allopathic trained residents are eligible for initial certification if they have completed an ACGME-approved residency in pediatrics. After graduation from residency, they must hold a medical license in the state where their medical practice is located and complete the required AOBP examinations.

The American Osteopathic Board of Pediatrics requires osteopathic pediatricians to renew their certification annually through the Longitudinal Assessment Program. Before 1995, the American Osteopathic Board of Pediatrics offered lifetime certificates to members recognized as board-certified, when their educational requirements were increased to maintain certification.

Pediatricians may receive Sub-speciality Certification in the following areas:

- Neonatology
- Pediatric Allergy/Immunology
- Sports Medicine
- Addiction Medicine

For the first time, all AOA board-certified physicians will have the opportunity to obtain the additional Designation of Osteopathic Manipulative Treatment (OMT) alongside their AOA Specialty Board Certification. The AOA Board Certification’s multi-specialty Distinct Osteopathic Examination Committee developed an exam for all AOA certifying boards. There are two exam components: a written examination, consisting of 70 questions, and an in-person OMT examination.

== See also ==
- American Osteopathic Association Bureau of Osteopathic Specialists
- American College of Pediatricians
