= Henrietta Bada =

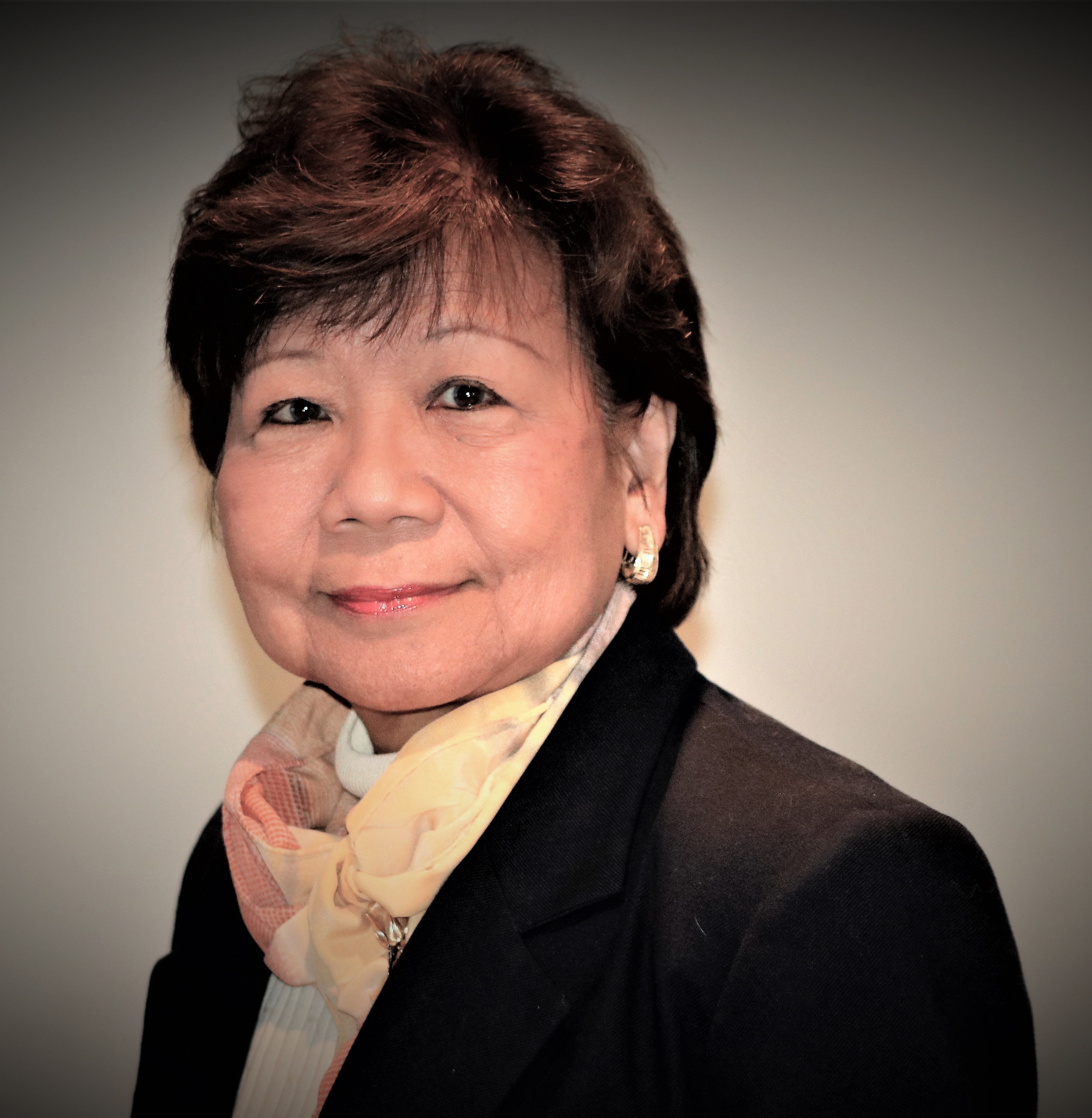
- Henrietta Bada
- Born: Philippines
- Education: MD, MPH, FAAP
- Occupations: Neonatologist, Professor, Researcher
- Awards: Dr. Thomas H. Pauly Perinatal Service Award, The Founders Award (KPA)

Henrietta Bada is a Philippines-born neonatologist at Kentucky Children's Hospital and professor of pediatrics at the University of Kentucky.

== Education ==
Bada became a Doctor of Medicine (MD) in 1969 from the University of Santo Tomas in the Philippines and completed her residency in 1973 at the University of Louisville. She became a Post Doctoral Fellow in Pediatrics (FAAP) at the University of Louisville in 1972. In 2000, she received her Master of Public Health (MPH) from the University of South Florida.

== Career ==
Since 2017, Bada has been serving as the Director for the Division of Maternal and Child Health, as well as the Title V Director for Kentucky. She has earned certification from the American Board of Pediatrics to practice both General Pediatrics and Neonatal-Perinatal Medicine. In addition to this, Bada is also a professor for the course "CPH 740- Introduction to Maternal and Child Health" at the University of Kentucky, which certifies doctoral students in the field. Bada actively researches newborn brain disorders and addiction in the NICU, as well as contributes to general research; she has published various findings from these studies. She is known for being one of the Principal Investigators (PI) of the Maternal Lifestyle Study (MLS), which examined children with histories of gestational drug exposure, up until they turned sixteen.

== Publications ==
The publications below are among the most cited and notable studies conducted by Bada, alongside other researchers.

- Shankaran, Seetha; Lester, Barry M.; Das, Abhik; Bauer, Charles R.; Bada, Henrietta S.; Lagasse, Linda; Higgins, Rosemary (April 2007). "Impact of maternal substance use during pregnancy on childhood outcome". Seminars in Fetal and Neonatal Medicine. 12 (2): 143–150. doi:10.1016/j.siny.2007.01.002. PMC 3717561. PMID 17317350.
- "Maternal Lifestyle Study in Four Sites in the United States, 1993-2011 (ICPSR 34312)." NAHDAP, University of Michigan Institute for Social Research, Version V9, March 31, 2016.
- Locke, Robin L.; Lagasse, Linda L.; Seifer, Ronald; Lester, Barry M.; Shankaran, Seetha; Bada, Henrietta S.; Bauer, Charles R. (May 2016). "Effects of prenatal substance exposure on infant temperament vary by context". Development and Psychopathology. 28 (2): 309–326. doi:10.1017/S0954579415000504. PMID 26037110.
- Cherry, Leigh; Havens, Jennifer; Whiting, Jason; Holz, Jennifer; Bada, Henrietta (1 January 2009). "Illicit Drug Use Among Women with Children in the United States: 2002–2003". Faculty Publications.
- Tang, Fei; Ng, Chee M.; Bada, Henrietta S.; Leggas, Markos (July 2021). "Clinical pharmacology and dosing regimen optimization of neonatal opioid withdrawal syndrome treatments". Clinical and Translational Science. 14 (4): 1231–1249. doi:10.1111/cts.12994. PMC 8301571. PMID 33650314.
- Patra, Aparna; Thakkar, Pratibha S.; Makhoul, Majd; Bada, Henrietta S. (25 February 2021). "Objective Assessment of Physiologic Alterations Associated With Hemodynamically Significant Patent Ductus Arteriosus in Extremely Premature Neonates". Frontiers in Pediatrics. 9 648584. doi:10.3389/fped.2021.648584. PMC 7946992. PMID 33718311.
- Miller, Jennifer S.; Bada, Henrietta S.; Westgate, Philip M.; Sithisarn, Thitinart; Leggas, Markos (5 February 2024). "Neonatal Abstinence Signs during Treatment: Trajectory, Resurgence and Heterogeneity". Children. 11 (2): 203. doi:10.3390/children11020203. PMC 10887053. PMID 38397314.
- Larson, Justine J.; Graham, Devon L.; Singer, Lynn T.; Beckwith, Anna M.; Terplan, Mishka; Davis, Jonathan M.; Martinez, Juan; Bada, Henrietta S. (1 August 2019). "Cognitive and Behavioral Impact on Children Exposed to Opioids During Pregnancy". Pediatrics. 144 (2) e20190514. doi:10.1542/peds.2019-0514. PMC 10106099. PMID 31320466.
- Bada, Henrietta S; Das, Abhik; Bauer, Charles R; Shankaran, Seetha; Lester, Barry M; Gard, Charlotte C; Wright, Linda L; LaGasse, Linda; Higgins, Rosemary (1 October 2005). "Low Birth Weight and Preterm Births: Etiologic Fraction Attributable to Prenatal Drug Exposure". Journal of Perinatology. 25 (10): 631–637. doi:10.1038/sj.jp.7211378. PMID 16107872.
- Pourcyrous, Massroor; Bada, Henrietta S.; Korones, Sheldon B.; Baselski, Vickie; Wong, Seok P. (1 September 1993). "Significance of Serial C-Reactive Protein Responses in Neonatal Infection and Other Disorders". Pediatrics. 92 (3): 431–435. doi:10.1542/peds.92.3.431. PMID 8361798.
- Bada, Henrietta S.; Korones, Sheldon B.; Perry, Edward H.; Arheart, Kristopher L.; Ray, John D.; Pourcyrous, Massroor; Magill, H. Lynn; Runyan, William; Somes, Grant W.; Clark, Frank C.; Tullis, Katherine V. (October 1990). "Mean arterial blood pressure changes in premature infants and those at risk for intraventricular hemorrhage". The Journal of Pediatrics. 117 (4): 607–614. doi:10.1016/S0022-3476(05)80700-0. PMID 2213390.

== Awards ==
In 2015, Bada received the Dr. Thomas H. Pauly Perinatal Service Award from the Kentucky Perinatal Association (KPA). In addition to this, she is a recipient of The Founders Award from the KPA in 2018.
