= Liaison psychiatry =

Psychiatric subspecialty at the interface between mental and physical health

- Synonyms: Liaison psychiatry; Psychosomatic medicine (former US subspecialty name)
- System: Mental health
- Focus: Psychiatric care of patients with medical, surgical or neurological illness
- Subdivisions: Psychosomatic medicine, Health psychology, Neuropsychiatry

Consultation–liaison psychiatry (C-L psychiatry or liaison psychiatry) is a subspecialty of psychiatry concerned with the assessment and treatment of psychiatric disorders and psychological distress in patients with medical, surgical or neurological conditions, usually in general hospitals and other medical settings. It operates at the interface between general medicine and psychiatry and is closely related to psychosomatic medicine, health psychology and neuropsychiatry.

Modern C-L psychiatry is commonly described within the biopsychosocial model proposed by George L. Engel, which emphasises the interaction of biological, psychological and social factors in health and disease.

== Definition and scope ==
Consultation–liaison psychiatry services typically provide assessment and treatment for patients:

- with psychiatric or behavioural symptoms caused or exacerbated by medical illness (for example delirium or mood changes due to systemic disease);
- with pre-existing mental disorders admitted for medical or surgical treatment;
- with medically unexplained physical symptoms or prominent somatic complaints without clear organic explanation;
- who experience psychological reactions to acute or chronic illness (such as adjustment disorder, anxiety, or depression after diagnosis of cancer or organ failure);
- who present with suicidal behaviour or self-harm in medical settings;
- who require assessment of capacity to consent to treatment or participation in complex ethical decisions (for example limitation of life-sustaining treatment).

C-L teams usually work in close collaboration with internal medicine, surgery, intensive care, emergency medicine, oncology, neurology, geriatrics, nursing, psychology and social work. Interventions include diagnostic assessment, psychopharmacology in the context of complex comorbidity and polypharmacy, brief psychological interventions, psychoeducation, and advice to clinical teams on communication, risk management and discharge planning.

== History ==
The historical roots of consultation–liaison psychiatry lie in the development of psychosomatic medicine in the first half of the 20th century, which underlined the role of psychological and social factors in the onset and course of medical disease. Early work by figures such as Franz Alexander and colleagues integrated psychoanalytic ideas into hospital medicine and helped establish dedicated psychosomatic units in general hospitals.

In the 1970s, Zbigniew J. Lipowski systematised the theoretical and clinical framework of consultation–liaison psychiatry, describing its functions in patient care, teaching and research within general hospitals. The field subsequently developed as a recognised component of psychiatric training in North America and Europe.

=== Recognition as a subspecialty ===
In the United States, psychosomatic medicine was approved in 2003 by the American Board of Medical Specialties (ABMS) as a psychiatric subspecialty, with the American Board of Psychiatry and Neurology (ABPN) administering the first subspecialty examination in 2005. The official subspecialty name was changed from Psychosomatic Medicine to Consultation-Liaison Psychiatry on 1 January 2018 to reflect more clearly its clinical role in general hospitals.

In Europe, the former European Association for Consultation-Liaison Psychiatry and Psychosomatics (EACLPP) – now part of the European Association of Psychosomatic Medicine – issued guidelines for training in C-L psychiatry and psychosomatics in 2007, highlighting marked variation in training across countries and recommending core competencies for residents and fellows.

The former Academy of Psychosomatic Medicine, a US-based professional organisation established in 1953, changed its name to the Academy of Consultation-Liaison Psychiatry (ACLP) in 2018 to align with the updated subspecialty title.

== Clinical practice ==
=== Settings and referral patterns ===
Most consultation–liaison psychiatry services are based in general hospitals, university medical centres or specialised medical institutions. Referrals typically arise from:

- inpatient medical and surgical wards (for example cardiology, oncology, respiratory medicine, nephrology);
- intensive care units (management of delirium, agitation, and psychological distress in critical illness);
- emergency departments (assessment after self-harm, suicidal ideation, confusion or acute behavioural disturbance);
- specialist clinics (such as pain, transplant, bariatric surgery, or autoimmune disease clinics).

Common reasons for referral include delirium and other neurocognitive disorders, mood and anxiety symptoms in the context of chronic disease, adjustment disorder, somatic symptom disorder and related conditions, substance use, psychosis secondary to medical illness or medications, and assessment of capacity for high-risk medical decisions.

In addition to direct patient care, C-L psychiatrists provide:

- consultation to medical and surgical teams regarding psychopharmacology in the presence of organ failure and drug–drug interactions;
- brief supportive or cognitive-behavioural interventions for patients and families;
- teaching for residents, fellows, nurses and allied health professionals;
- participation in ethics committees and complex discharge planning.

=== Models of care ===
Consultation–liaison psychiatry services are often described in terms of three overlapping modes of practice:

Consultation
Time-limited assessment and management recommendations provided at the request of another clinical team for a specific question (for example differential diagnosis of delirium, evaluation of suicidal risk, advice on antidepressant use in cardiac disease).

Liaison
Ongoing participation of the C-L psychiatrist or multidisciplinary team in ward rounds, case conferences, multidisciplinary meetings and staff support, aiming to promote a biopsychosocial approach and improve collaboration between mental health and medical teams.

Follow-up or specialised clinics
Post-discharge or outpatient follow-up for selected groups of patients, such as those undergoing organ transplantation, oncology patients, older people with complex comorbidity, or individuals undergoing bariatric surgery.

Innovative service models include proactive C-L psychiatry in intensive care and geriatric units, and rapid-response teams covering emergency departments and acute wards. The Rapid Assessment, Interface and Discharge (RAID) model developed in Birmingham, United Kingdom, is an example of a comprehensive liaison service operating 24/7 across an acute hospital, including older adults, emergency care and general wards.

== Effectiveness ==
A number of observational studies and systematic reviews have examined whether consultation–liaison psychiatry improves clinical and economic outcomes in general hospitals.

Medical–psychiatric comorbidity is consistently associated with longer lengths of stay, higher costs and increased readmission rates. A systematic review and meta-analysis by Jansen and colleagues reported that inpatients with depressive symptoms had hospital stays on average more than four days longer than those without depression, and that medical–psychiatric comorbidity was linked to higher healthcare expenditure overall.

Wood and Wand reviewed studies of consultation–liaison services and found evidence that structured interventions may improve recognition and treatment of depression and anxiety, and in some settings reduce length of stay or readmissions, although study designs were heterogeneous and often lacked randomisation.

Economic evaluations of integrated liaison models, such as the RAID service in Birmingham, suggest that comprehensive 24/7 teams may save hospital bed days and reduce costs by shortening admissions and preventing readmissions.

In older people, delirium is a major focus of C-L activity. A Lancet review by Inouye and colleagues highlighted that delirium in hospitalised older adults is associated with increased mortality, functional decline, institutionalisation and incident dementia, and that multicomponent, multidisciplinary interventions can reduce incidence and duration of delirium and related complications.

== Training and certification ==
=== United States ===
In the United States, consultation–liaison psychiatry is a one-year, Accreditation Council for Graduate Medical Education (ACGME)–accredited fellowship that follows completion of a general psychiatry residency. Graduates are eligible to sit the ABPN subspecialty examination in consultation–liaison psychiatry, which is recognised by the ABMS. Many academic medical centres offer C-L fellowships focusing on areas such as transplant psychiatry, psycho-oncology, women’s mental health, psycho-cardiology or intensive care psychiatry.

=== Europe and the United Kingdom ===
European training in C-L psychiatry varies by country. The EACLPP/European Association of Psychosomatic Medicine guidelines recommend that all psychiatry residents develop core competencies in consultation and liaison work, with optional advanced training for those specialising in the field. Several European countries offer dedicated fellowships or advanced modules in psychosomatic medicine and C-L psychiatry integrated into national training schemes.

In the United Kingdom, liaison psychiatry services are now a standard component of National Health Service (NHS) mental health provision in general hospitals, although surveys have reported variation in staffing and 24-hour coverage. National policy initiatives have promoted the expansion of “core 24” liaison services in acute hospitals across England.

Ireland has published a national model of care for consultation–liaison psychiatry, defining recommended staffing levels, care pathways and links with emergency departments, geriatric medicine and primary care.

=== Mexico and Latin America ===
In Latin America, liaison psychiatry has developed within university hospitals and tertiary care centres. In Mexico, one of the earliest published clinical series describing liaison activity in a general hospital came from the Hospital General de México “Dr. Eduardo Liceaga”, reporting patterns of psychiatric diagnosis such as adjustment disorders, delirium and substance use disorders among medical and surgical inpatients.

Several formal one-year advanced training programmes in liaison psychiatry (alta especialidad) have since been established, often under the academic auspices of the National Autonomous University of Mexico (UNAM) or other universities:

- The Instituto Nacional de Ciencias Médicas y Nutrición Salvador Zubirán offers a UNAM-accredited high-specialty programme in liaison psychiatry, as part of its portfolio of advanced medical fellowships.
- The Centro Médico Nacional “20 de Noviembre” of the Instituto de Seguridad y Servicios Sociales de los Trabajadores del Estado (ISSSTE) runs a liaison psychiatry high-specialty programme in a tertiary care hospital, also linked to UNAM and focused on complex medical–psychiatric comorbidity.
- Private-sector and university hospitals, such as Hospital Ángeles Pedregal in Mexico City and TecSalud’s Hospital Zambrano Hellion in Monterrey, host advanced programmes and clinical services in liaison or hospital psychiatry affiliated with universities including Universidad La Salle and the Tecnológico de Monterrey.

Published Latin American reports highlight similar patterns of comorbidity to those seen elsewhere, with high rates of adjustment disorders, depressive and anxiety disorders, delirium and substance use among patients referred to liaison services, as well as challenges in staffing and integration within hospital systems.

== Research topics ==
Research in consultation–liaison psychiatry covers a wide range of topics at the interface of medicine and mental health, including:

- epidemiology of psychiatric disorders in medical inpatients (for example depression in cardiovascular disease or cancer);
- screening and treatment of depression and anxiety in chronic illness;
- prevention, detection and management of delirium;
- somatic symptom and related disorders;
- bariatric surgery and mental health;
- neuropsychiatry of autoimmune and inflammatory diseases;
- ethical issues such as decision-making capacity and end-of-life care;
- health-services research on models of integrated care and cost-effectiveness of liaison services.

== See also ==
- Psychosomatic medicine
- Health psychology
- Hospital psychiatry
- Psychiatry
- Psychosomatic medicine (subspecialty)
