= American Osteopathic Board of Pathology =

US certification organization

- Abbreviation: AOBPa
- Formation: 1943
- Type: Professional
- Headquarters: Chicago, Illinois, IL
- Coordinates: 41.8942°N 87.6190°W
- Chair: Gregory McDonald, D.O.
- Vice-Chair: Alan F. Henke, D.O.
- Secretary-Treasurer: Karen P. Kantor, D.O.
- Website: aobpath.org

The American Osteopathic Board of Pathology (AOBPa) is an organization that provides board certification to qualified Doctors of Osteopathic Medicine (D.O.) who specialize in the diagnosis and characterization of disease in patients following thorough examination of biopsies and/or bodily fluids (pathologists).

== Background ==
The board is one 18 medical specialty certifying boards of the American Osteopathic Association Bureau of Osteopathic Specialists approved by the American Osteopathic Association (AOA), and was established in 1974. As of December 2011, 55 osteopathic pathologists held active certification with the AOBPa. In addition to fellows of the American Board of Pathology, board certified osteopathic pathologists are eligible for admission to the College of American Pathologists and to the American Society for Mohs Surgery.

== Certification ==
To become board certified in pathology, candidates must have completed an AOA-approved residency in pathology. Additionally, candidates must have completed the required clinical, oral, and written exams. Since 1995, board certified osteopathic pathologists must renew their certification every ten years to avoid expiration of their board certification status. The AOBPa oversees examination of candidates in the areas of anatomic pathology, dermatopathology, forensic pathology, and laboratory medicine. Additionally, the AOBPa provides a Certificate of Added Qualifications in dermatopathology and a Certificate of Special Qualifications in forensic pathology.

== See also ==
- American Osteopathic Association Bureau of Osteopathic Specialists
