= Obstetrics and gynaecology =

Medical specialty encompassing two subspecialties

Obstetrics and gynaecology (also spelled as obstetrics and gynecology; abbreviated as Obst and Gynae, O&G, OB-GYN and OB/GYN (Note: "OB-GYN" (or "OB/GYN") is most commonly treated as an initialism and pronounced as five individual letters, even though it only represents two different words.)) is the medical specialty that encompasses the two subspecialties of obstetrics (covering pregnancy, childbirth, and the postpartum period) and gynaecology (covering the health of the female reproductive system – vagina, uterus, ovaries, and breasts). The specialization is an important part of care for women's health.

Postgraduate training programs for both fields are usually combined, preparing the practising obstetrician-gynecologist to be adept at the care of female reproductive organs' health and at the management of pregnancy, although many doctors go on to develop subspecialty interests in one field or the other.

== Scope ==
=== United States ===
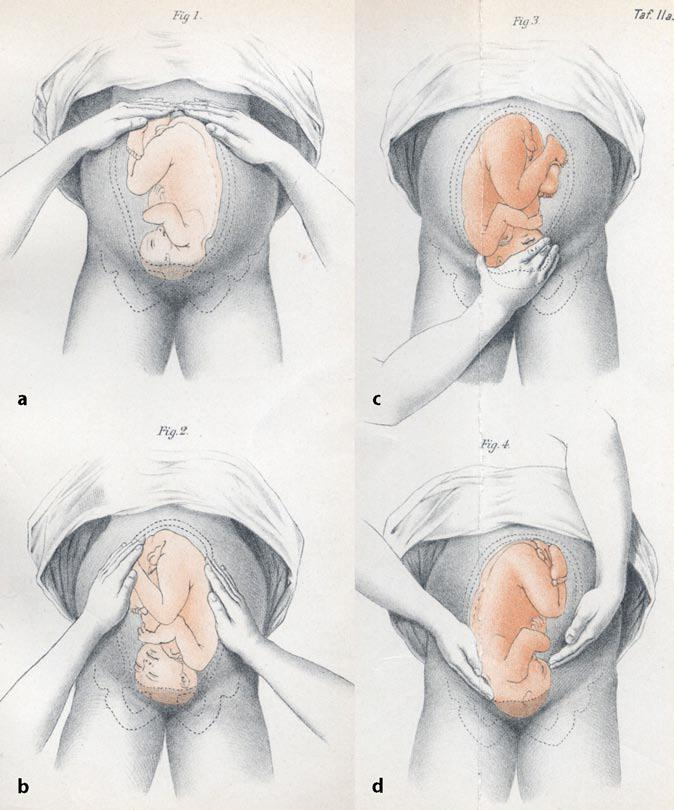
Leopold's maneuvers

According to the American Board of Obstetrics and Gynecology (ABOG), which is responsible for issuing OB-GYN certifications in the United States, the first step to OB-GYN certification is completing medical school to receive an MD or DO degree. From there doctors must complete a four-year OB-GYN residency program approved by the Accreditation Council for Graduate Medical Education (ACGME). For the 2021 Electronic Residency Application Service (ERAS) match, there were 277 OB-GYN residency programs accepting applicants.

In their fourth year of residency, with an affidavit from their director to confirm program completion, OB-GYN residents can choose whether to begin the board certification process by applying to take the ABOG Qualifying Exam, which is a written test. If residents pass the Qualifying Exam, demonstrating they possess the knowledge and skills to potentially become certified OB-GYNs, they are then eligible to sit for the oral Certification Exam. Before the Certification Exam, residents must also gather a list of patient cases they've worked on throughout their residency to demonstrate their competence and experience in OB-GYN patient care.

Residents then sit for the three-hour oral exam at ABOG's test center, and if they pass the exam, they become "board-certified" OB-GYNs. Since 2013, at least 82% of all Certifying Exam examinees have passed.

This adds up to 11–14 years of education and practical experience. The first 7–9 years are general medical training.

Experienced OB-GYN professionals can seek certifications in sub-specialty areas, including maternal and fetal medicine. See Fellowship (medicine).

=== United Kingdom ===
All doctors must first complete medical school and obtain a MBBS or equivalent certification. This portion typically takes five years. Following this, they are eligible for provisional registration with the General Medical Council. They then must complete two years of foundation training. After the first year of training is complete, trainees are eligible for full registration with the General Medical Council. After the foundation training is complete applicants take the Part 1 MRCOG examination administered by the Royal College of Obstetricians and Gynaecologists. There are an additional seven years of training after this, and two more exams (Part 2 and Part 3 MRCOG exams), which adds up to nine years total minimum in training, although some trainees may take longer.

== Subspecialties ==
Examples of subspecialty training available to physicians in the US are:

- Maternal-fetal medicine: an obstetrical subspecialty, sometimes referred to as perinatology, that focuses on the medical and surgical management of high-risk pregnancies and surgery on the fetus to reduce morbidity and mortality.
- Reproductive endocrinology and infertility: a subspecialty that focuses on the biological causes and interventional treatment of infertility
- Gynecological oncology: a gynaecologic subspecialty focusing on the medical and surgical treatment of women with cancers of the reproductive organs
- Female pelvic medicine and reconstructive surgery: a gynaecologic subspecialty focusing on the diagnosis and surgical treatment of women with urinary incontinence and prolapse of the pelvic organs. Sometimes referred to by laypersons as "female urology"
- Advanced laparoscopic surgery
- Family planning: a gynaecologic subspecialty offering training in contraception and pregnancy termination (abortion)
- Pediatric and adolescent gynaecology
- Menopausal and geriatric gynaecology

Of these, only the first four are truly recognized sub-specialties by the Accreditation Council for Graduate Medical Education (ACGME) and the American Board of Obstetrics and Gynecology (ABOG). The other subspecialties are recognized as informal concentrations of practice. To be recognized as a board-certified subspecialist by the American Board of Obstetrics and Gynecology or the American Osteopathic Board of Obstetrics and Gynecology, a practitioner must have completed an ACGME or AOA-accredited residency and obtained a Certificate of Added Qualifications (CAQ) which requires an additional standardized examination.

Additionally, physicians of other specialties may become trained in Advanced Life Support in Obstetrics (ALSO), a short certification that equips them to better manage emergent OB/GYN situations.

== Common procedures ==
There are many procedures that can be provided to people by OB/GYNs. Some procedures may include:

- Colposcopy: If the results of a cervical cancer screening test, such as a Pap smear or HPV test, are abnormal, this more thorough examination of the cervix and vaginal tissues may be needed.
- Loop electrical excision procedure (LEEP): A procedure to quickly remove abnormal vaginal tissue within the cervix. A local anesthetic and a solution to enhance the points of removal visually are administered during the process. There is a chance of experiencing watery, pinkish discharge, brownish discharge, and mild cramping.
- Endometrial biopsy: A procedure that collects a tissue sample from the endometrium lining of the uterus. The sample is tested and checked under a microscope for abnormal cells or indicators of cancer.
- IUD insertion: An intrauterine device that is T-shaped and is placed in the uterus through the cervix. It is a reversible contraceptive that can be done in a doctor's office.
- Nexplanon: A roughly 4 cm long implant that goes into the upper forearm. This implant releases birth control hormones into the body and can last up to three years. This type of birth control has a 99% success rate for pregnancy prevention.
- Dilation and curettage (D&C): An outpatient procedure to open (dilate) the cervix to collect samples of endometrial tissue with a curette. A D&C can also be done to remove a fetus that was not passed naturally after a miscarriage or to induce an abortion.
- Tubal ligation: A surgery to close the fallopian tubes for the prevention of pregnancy. It is also known as "tying the tubes".
- Ovarian cystectomy: The removal of a cyst that either has a solid appearance, is larger than three inches in diameter, can become cancerous, or causes constant pain. Cysts can be removed without removing an ovary. Women who do not take birth control produce small cysts every other month, but they can disappear on their own.
- Cervical and breast cancer screenings
- Treatment of urinary tract infections
- STI treatment
- NICU care: Intensive care for ill or premature newborn babies.
- Vaginal and cesarean section births
- General postnatal care

== See also ==
- Andrology
- Instruments used in obstetrics and gynecology
- Neonatal infection
- Urology

== Bibliography ==
- Llewellyn-Jones D, Abraham S, Oats J (1999). Fundamentals of Obstetrics and Gynecology (7th ed.). Mosby. ISBN 978-0-7234-3150-3.
