= Deborah A. Driscoll =

American reproductive geneticist

- Born: Cos Cob, Connecticut, US
- Spouse: Christos B. Coutifaris (m. 1987)

Academic background
- Education: BS, Smith College; MD, New York University Grossman School of Medicine

Academic work
- Institutions: Perelman School of Medicine at the University of Pennsylvania

Deborah Anne Driscoll is an American reproductive geneticist. She is the Luigi Mastroianni Jr. Professor and chair of the Department of Obstetrics and Gynecology at the Perelman School of Medicine at the University of Pennsylvania.

== Early life and education ==
Driscoll was born to William V. Driscoll, the former vice president of the American Paper Institute, in Cos Cob, Connecticut. Growing up, she worked as a candy striper in the hospital gift shop, the lunch counter, and laundry room when she was in ninth grade. Despite her mother's original reservations, Driscoll's grandmother inspired her to pursue a career in medicine. She graduated from Smith College and New York University Grossman School of Medicine and completed her residency in obstetrics and gynecology at the Hospital of the University of Pennsylvania. While waiting to enroll at medical school, Driscoll accepted a position at Rockefeller University working on sickle cell anemia.

== Career ==
Following her residency, Driscoll joined the faculty at the Perelman School of Medicine at the University of Pennsylvania in 1984. During her tenure at Perelman, Driscoll became known for her research on the 22q11.2 deletion syndrome and for her expertise on genetic screening and the care of women with genetic conditions. She was promoted to Full Professor of Obstetrics and Gynecology in 2005 and was the recipient of the Perelman's Distinguished Graduate and Alumni Service Award. In 2010, Driscoll was elected to the National Academy of Medicine (then called the Institute of Medicine) for being "considered one of the world’s leading obstetrician-gynecologist geneticists...for her expertise in adolescent gynecology and the care of women with genetic disorders." She has also co-authored many books including Gabbe's Obstetrics: Normal and Problem Pregnancies (now in its Ninth edition) and Gabbe’s Obstetrics Essentials: Normal and Problem Pregnancies

While serving as chair of the Department of Obstetrics and Gynecology in 2014 - 2018, Driscoll was elected president of the American Board of Obstetrics and Gynecology becoming the first woman president in the organization's history. A few years later, she received the Group on Women in Medicine and Science 2017 Leadership Award for an Individual and 2018 Elizabeth Kirk Rose Award. In 2019, Driscoll became the Senior Vice President for the Clinical Practices of the University of Pennsylvania and Vice Dean for Professional Services in the Perelman School of Medicine.

== Personal life ==
Driscoll married Christos B. Coutifaris in 1987 in a Greek Orthodox ceremony and they have two children together.
