= American Osteopathic Association Bureau of Osteopathic Specialists =

Medical non-profit organization

American Osteopathic Association / Bureau of Osteopathic Specialists
- Abbreviation: BOS
- Formation: 1939
- Type: Non-profit organization
- Headquarters: Chicago, Illinois
- Location: United States
- Official language: English
- Chair: Furhut Janssen, DO
- Vice-Chair: Joan Grzybowski, DO
- Director, BOS Secretary: Jessica McCauley
- Website: https://certification.osteopathic.org/bureau-of-osteopathic-specialists/

Established in 1939, the American Osteopathic Association's (AOA) Bureau of Osteopathic Specialists (BOS) is the supervisory body for the AOA's 16 Specialty Certifying Boards in the United States. The BOS establishes and enforces policy for board certification through the AOA Specialty Certifying Boards and maintains high standards for certification by developing and implementing educational and professional standards used to evaluate and certify osteopathic and non-osteopathic (MD and equivalent) physicians.

AOA Board Certification is recognized by key healthcare accreditation organizations. The AOA is also recognized as the primary verification source for physician osteopathic board certification data on medical specialists for credentialing purposes.

== History ==
The concept of a specialty board was first proposed in 1908 by Dr. Derrick T. Vail. In 1916, ophthalmology became the first officially incorporated board. The second specialty board, the American Board of Otolaryngology, was founded and incorporated in 1924. The American Board of Obstetrics and Gynecology (1930) and the American Board of Dermatology and Syphilology (1932) followed. The AOA BOS was organized in 1939 as the Advisory Board for Osteopathic Specialists for the certification of osteopathic physicians. The first medical specialty board part of the AOA BOS was the American Osteopathic Board of Radiology. In 1993, the Board of Trustees of the American Osteopathic Association (AOA), through its agency, the Bureau of Osteopathic Specialists, became the osteopathic certifying body.

== Member boards ==
The following are the specialty certifying boards of the American Osteopathic Association:

- American Osteopathic Board of Anesthesiology
- American Osteopathic Board of Dermatology
- American Osteopathic Board of Emergency Medicine
- American Osteopathic Board of Family Physicians
- American Osteopathic Board of Internal Medicine
- American Osteopathic Board of Neurology and Psychiatry
- American Osteopathic Board of Neuromusculoskeletal Medicine
- American Osteopathic Board of Nuclear Medicine
- American Osteopathic Board of Obstetrics and Gynecology
- American Osteopathic Board of Ophthalmology and Otolaryngology
- American Osteopathic Board of Orthopedic Surgery
- American Osteopathic Board of Pathology
- American Osteopathic Board of Pediatrics
- American Osteopathic Board of Physical Medicine and Rehabilitation
- American Osteopathic Board of Preventive Medicine
- American Osteopathic Board of Proctology
- American Osteopathic Board of Radiology
- American Osteopathic Board of Surgery

== See also ==
- American Board of Medical Specialties
- American Board of Physician Specialties
- Residency (medicine)
- Fellowship (medicine)
