= Colorectal surgery =

Field in medicine for disabilities in the rectum

Colorectal surgery is a field in medicine dealing with disorders of the rectum, anus, and colon. The field is also known as proctology, but this term is now used infrequently within medicine and is most often employed to identify practices relating to the anus and rectum in particular. The word proctology is derived from the Greek words πρωκτός proktos, meaning "anus" or "hindparts", and -λογία -logia, meaning "science" or "study".

Physicians specializing in this field of medicine are called colorectal surgeons or proctologists. In the United States, to become colorectal surgeons, surgical doctors have to complete a general surgery residency as well as a colorectal surgery fellowship, upon which they are eligible to be certified in their field of expertise by the American Board of Colon and Rectal Surgery or the American Osteopathic Board of Proctology. In other countries, certification to practice proctology is given to surgeons at the end of a 2–3 year subspecialty residency by the country's board of surgery.

== Scope of the specialty ==
Colorectal surgical disorders include:

- varicosities or swelling, and inflammation of veins in the rectum and anus (hemorrhoids)
- unnatural cracks or tears in the anus (anal fissures)
- abnormal connections or passageways between the rectum or other anorectal area to the skin surface (fistulas)
- severe constipation conditions
- fecal incontinence
- protrusion of the walls of the rectum through the anus (rectal prolapse)
- birth defects such as the imperforate anus
- treatment of severe colic disorders, such as Crohn's disease
- cancer of the colon and rectum (colorectal cancer)
- pilonidal disease (pilonidal sinus / pilonidal cyst)
- repositioning of the rectal area if fallen out
- anal cancer
- any injuries to the anus
- removal of objects inserted into anus
- performing colonoscopies
- performing hemorrhoidectomies

== Surgical treatment and diagnostic procedures ==
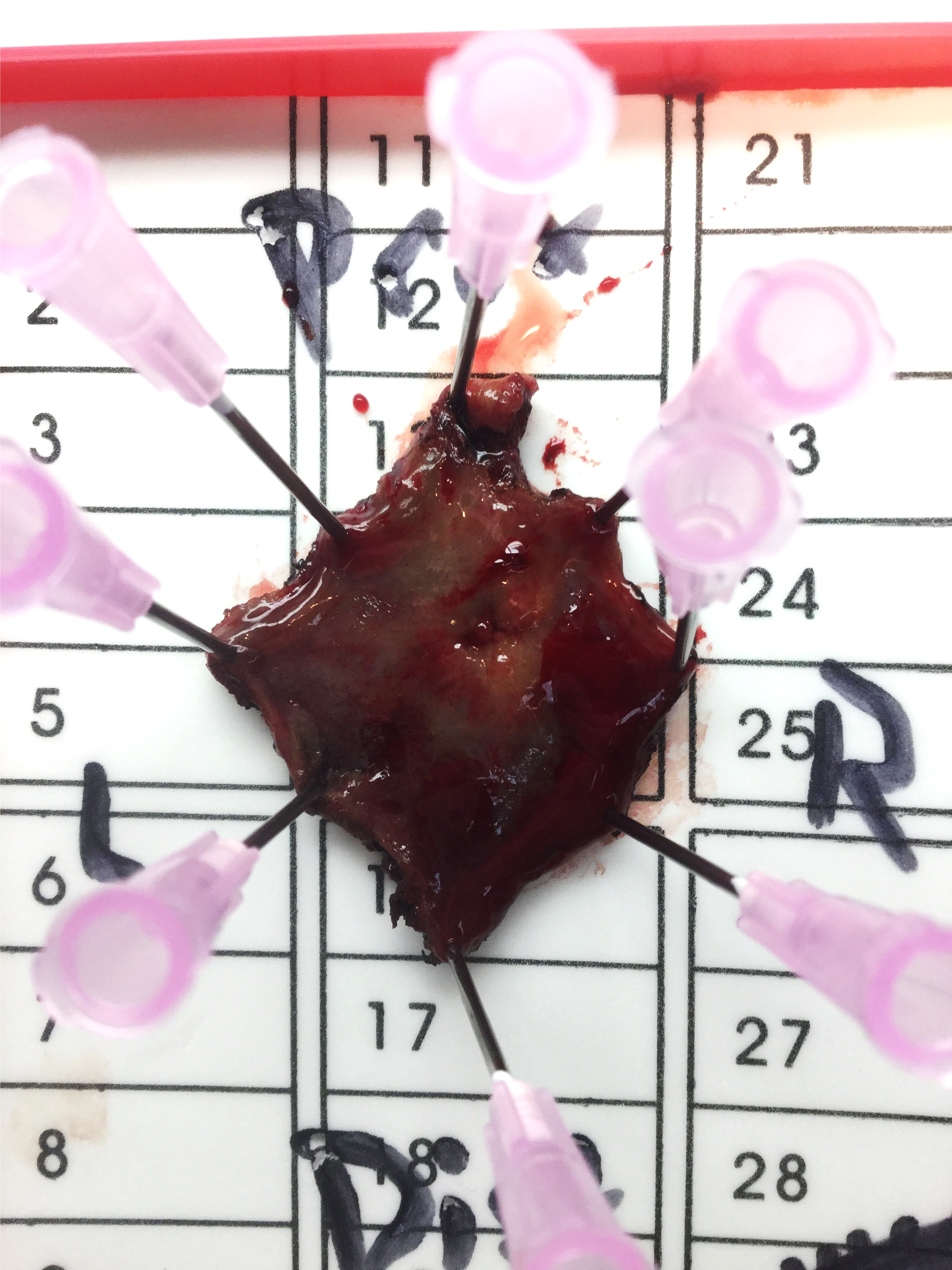
Gross pathology of a tubulovillous adenoma resected by minimally invasive colorectal surgery.

Surgical forms of treatment for these conditions include: colectomy, ileo/colostomy, polypectomy, strictureplasty, hemorrhoidectomy (in severe cases of hemorrhoids), minimally invasive surgery, including laser surgery, as well as anoplasty, and more, depending on the condition the patient has. Diagnostic procedures, such as a colonoscopy, are very important in colorectal surgery, as they can tell the physician what type of diagnosis should be given and what procedure should be done to correct the condition. Other diagnostic procedures used by colorectal surgeons include: proctoscopy, defecating proctography, sigmoidoscopy. In recent times, the laparoscopic method of surgery has seen a surge of popularity, due to its lower risks, decreased recovery time, and smaller, more precise incisions achieved by using laparoscopic instruments.

== Laser therapies in colorectal surgery ==
Minimally invasive laser-based techniques are used in the treatment of hemorrhoidal disease, pilonidal disease, anal fistulas, and anal fissures. Systematic reviews and guideline-based recommendations have evaluated laser-based interventions for these indications, with high-level evidence available for some procedures. Clinical practice recommendations identify symptomatic grade II and III hemorrhoids as standard indications for laser hemorrhoidoplasty as a standalone procedure. For anal fistulas, guideline-based recommendations describe fistula laser closure as a sphincter-preserving option in selected cases, including cryptoglandular fistulas at risk of postoperative continence impairment, as well as fistulas associated with Crohn's disease and in female patients. In the treatment of anal fissures, laser-based approaches have been described as minimally invasive sphincter-preserving alternatives to conventional surgical techniques, with the aim of preserving continence. For pilonidal disease, the 2024 European Society of Coloproctology (ESCP) guidelines state that laser-based techniques such as sinus laser-assisted closure (SiLaC/SiLaT) may be considered as minimally invasive options in selected patients, reflecting an evolving evidence base.

== Mechanical bowel preparation ==
Mechanical bowel preparation (MBP) involves clearing the bowel lumen before surgery, most commonly using sodium phosphate,[5] though evidence for its routine use is limited. However, recent evidence indicates that combining mechanical bowel preparation with oral antibiotics before elective colorectal surgery probably reduces the risk of surgical site infections and anastomotic leakage compared with mechanical preparation alone, without clear effects on mortality, postoperative ileus, or hospital stay.

== Postoperative care ==
=== Early enteral nutrition ===
Evidence suggests that initiating enteral nutrition within 24 hours after lower gastrointestinal surgery may reduce hospital stay, though effects on postoperative complications and mortality remain uncertain.

== See also ==
- Proctalgia fugax
