= American Osteopathic Board of Obstetrics and Gynecology =

US healthcare certification organization

- Abbreviation: AOBOG
- Formation: 1942
- Type: Professional
- Headquarters: Chicago Heights, IL
- Coordinates: 41.5062°N 87.6089°W
- Chairman: Ronald J. Librizzi, D.O.
- Vice Chairman: Carolyn W. Quist, D.O.
- Secretary-Treasurer: Angelo Alexander, D.O.
- Website: certification.osteopathic.org/obstetrics-gynecology

The American Osteopathic Board of Obstetrics and Gynecology (AOBOG) is an organization that provides board certification to qualified Doctors of Osteopathic Medicine (D.O.) who specialize in the care of the female reproductive tract and children during the course of pregnancy, childbirth, and the postnatal period (obstetricians) and to qualified Doctors of Osteopathic Medicine who specialize in the diagnosis and treatment of diseases of the female reproductive tract (gynecologists). The board is one 18 medical specialty certifying boards of the American Osteopathic Association Bureau of Osteopathic Specialists approved by the American Osteopathic Association (AOA), and was established in 1942. As of December 2011, 1,082 osteopathic obstetricians and gynecologists held active certification with the AOBOG.

== Board certification ==
Initial certification is available to eligible osteopathic obstetricians and gynecologists who have successfully completed an AOA-approved residency in obstetrics and gynecology, or a fellowship in female pelvic medicine and reconstructive surgery, gynecologic oncology, maternal-fetal medicine, or reproductive endocrinology.

Since June 2002, board-certified osteopathic obstetricians and gynecologists have been required to renew their certification every six years to avoid expiration of their board certification. However, diplomates of the AOBOG who received their certification before this time are not required to undergo recertification and possess lifelong certification.

Osteopathic obstetricians and gynecologists may also receive Certification of Special Qualifications (CSQ) in the following areas:

- Female Pelvic Medicine/Reconstructive Surgery
- Gynecologic Oncology
- Maternal and Fetal Medicine
- Reproductive Endocrinology
