= American Board of Colon and Rectal Surgery =

US certification organization

The American Board of Colon and Rectal Surgery (ABCRS) is a member of the American Board of Medical Specialties that issues certificates for practitioners of Colorectal surgery.

The board was established in 1934 as the American Board of Proctology.

== See also ==
- American Osteopathic Board of Proctology
