= Forensic pathology =

Medical speciality

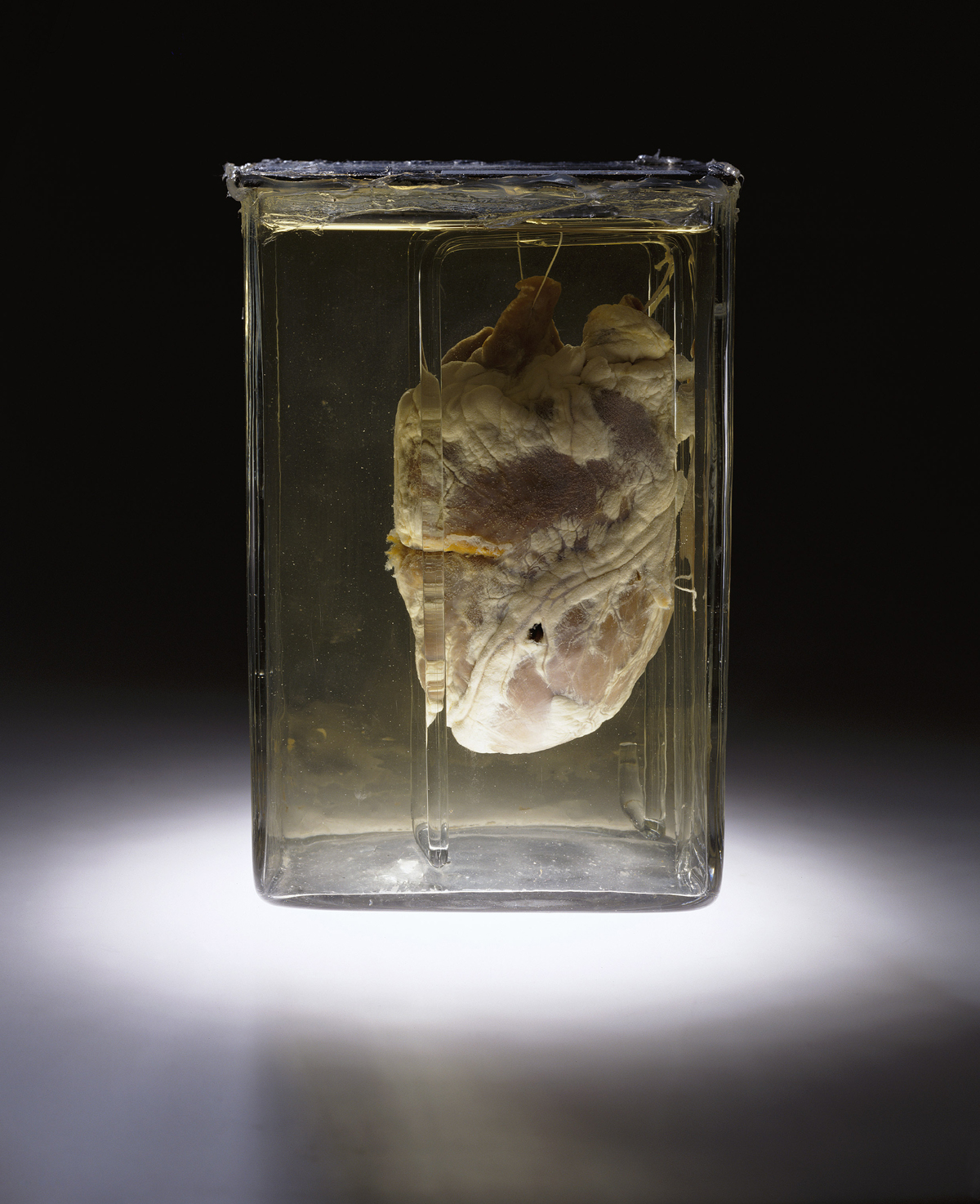
The heart of a murder victim

Forensic pathology is a field of medicine that focuses on determining the cause of death by examining a corpse. A post mortem examination is performed by a medical examiner or forensic pathologist, usually during the investigation of criminal law cases and civil law cases in some jurisdictions. Coroners and medical examiners are also frequently asked to confirm the identity of remains.

== Duties ==
Forensic pathology is an application of medical jurisprudence. A forensic pathologist is a medical doctor who has completed training in anatomical pathology and has subsequently specialized in forensic pathology. The requirements for becoming a "fully qualified" forensic pathologist vary from country to country. Some of the different requirements are discussed below (see § Education).

The forensic pathologist performs autopsies/postmortem examinations with the goal of determining the cause of death as well as the possible manner of death. The autopsy report contains conclusions made relating to the following:

- The pathological process, injury, or disease that directly results in or initiates a series of events that lead to a person's death (also called the mechanism of death), such as a bullet wound to the head, exsanguination caused by a stab wound, manual or ligature strangulation, myocardial infarction resulting from coronary artery disease, etc.)
- The manner of death, the circumstances surrounding the cause of death, which, in most jurisdictions, include the following:
  - Homicide
  - Accidental
  - Natural
  - Suicide
  - Undetermined

The autopsy also provides an opportunity for other issues raised by the death to be addressed, such as the collection of trace evidence or determining the identity of the deceased. Autopsies are performed when a death occurs, when an unexpected death occurs, when someone dies while not under the care of a physician, to solve criminal cases, when a mass disaster occurs and requires the identification of the victims and upon request by the family or loved ones of the deceased. Typically, autopsies can cost anywhere from $3,000 to $5,000, however the price can vary from country to country.

The forensic pathologist examines and documents wounds and injuries, along with the possible causation of those injuries, at autopsy, at the scene of a crime and occasionally in a clinical setting, such as rape investigation or deaths in custody.

Forensic pathologists collect and examine tissue specimens under the microscope (histology) to identify the presence or absence of natural disease and other microscopic findings such as asbestos bodies in the lungs or gunpowder particles around a gunshot wound. They collect and interpret toxicological specimens of body tissues and fluids to determine the chemical cause of accidental overdoses or deliberate poisonings.

Forensic pathologists work closely with the medico-legal authority for the area concerned with the investigation of sudden and unexpected deaths: the coroner (England and Wales), procurator fiscal (Scotland), or coroner or medical examiner (United States).

It is highly important for the verdict of an autopsy to be accurate and unbiased. The manner of death determined by the medical examiner influences greatly the investigative process. Cognitive bias poses a problem for its unconscious influence on decision-making, hence the importance of filtering irrelevant contextual information.

In mass disaster settings, forensic pathologists will work alongside Forensic Odontologists, Forensics Anthropologists as well as other forensic specialties with the goal of identifying the victims of the disaster. The process of identification involves the recovery of the victims, the collection of antemortem data, the initial examination along with the collection of any postmortem evidence, and finally the comparison of the antemortem and postmortem data gathered in order to identify those victims.

They serve as expert witnesses in courts of law testifying in civil or criminal law cases.

In an autopsy, the forensic pathologist is often assisted by an autopsy/mortuary technician (sometimes called a diener in the US).

Forensic physicians sometimes referred to as "forensic medical examiners" or "police surgeons" (in the UK until recently), are medical doctors trained in the examination of, and provision of medical treatment to, living victims of assault, including sexual assault, and individuals who find themselves in police custody. Many forensic physicians in the UK practice clinical forensic medicine part-time, and they also practice family medicine or another medical specialty.

In the United Kingdom, membership of the Royal College of Pathologists is not a prerequisite of appointment as a coroner's medical expert. Doctors in the UK who are not forensic pathologists or pathologists are allowed to perform medicolegal autopsies, as the wording of the Coroners and Justice Act 2009, which merely stipulates a "registered medical practitioner": anyone on the General Medical Council register.

Forensic pathologists make contributions to public health and preventative medicine by studying the dead. By using their findings during autopsies, they can use their knowledge to prevent the death of another person.

== Investigation of death ==
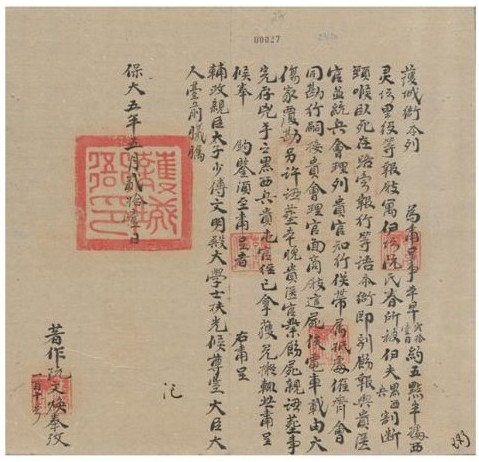
A French Indochinese forensic autopsy report of a murder victim killed in the year Bảo Đại 5 (1930).

Pathologists determine the cause of death through postmortem examination or autopsy. There are three stages of death investigation: examination, correlation, and interpretation. Deaths where there is an unknown cause and those considered unnatural are investigated. In most jurisdictions this is done by a "forensic pathologist", coroner, medical examiner, or hybrid medical examiner-coroner offices.

=== Methods ===
Forensic pathologists must be trained in several fields to succeed at their job. They utilize a wide variety of methods such as conducting autopsies which in itself has a variety of methods. Some of these methods require various identification techniques, including immunohistological studies, which can be valuable for determining the time of injury and assessing axonal damage resulting from traumatic brain injury When conducting an autopsy a forensic pathologist may take X-Rays, samples of bodily fluids, samples of tissues, and samples of bacterial culture found within the body. While conducting the autopsy the forensic pathologist uses the stages of death as another method to inspect both the time of death and the amount of time the body has been deceased. Using the Information received during the autopsy paired with evidence provided by law enforcement provides the basis for the determination of the cause of death.

=== Terminology inconsistencies across jurisdictions ===
In some jurisdictions, the title of "Medical Examiner" is used by a non-physician, elected official involved in a medicolegal death investigation. In others, the law requires the medical examiner to be a physician, pathologist, or forensic pathologist.

Similarly, the title "coroner" is applied to both physicians and non-physicians. Historically, coroners were not all physicians (most often serving primarily as the town mortician). However, in some jurisdictions, the topic of "Coroner" is exclusively used by physicians.

=== Canadian coroners ===
In Canada, there was a mix of coroner and medical examiner systems, depending on the province or territory. In Ontario, coroners are licensed physicians, usually but not exclusively family physicians. In Quebec, there is a mix of medical and non-medical coroners, whereas, in British Columbia, there is predominantly a non-physician coroner system. Alberta and Nova Scotia are examples of ME systems

=== Coroners and medical examiners in the United States ===
In the United States, a coroner is typically an elected public official in a particular geographic jurisdiction who investigates and certifies deaths. The vast majority of coroners lack a Doctor of Medicine degree and the amount of medical training that they have received is highly variable, depending on their profession (e.g. law enforcement, judges, funeral directors, emergency medical technicians, nurses).

In contrast, a medical examiner is typically a physician who holds the degree of Doctor of Medicine (M.D.) or Doctor of Osteopathic Medicine (D.O.). Ideally, a medical examiner has completed both a pathology residency and a fellowship in forensic pathology. In some jurisdictions, a medical examiner must be both a doctor and a lawyer, with additional training in forensic pathology.

== History ==
Forensic pathology was founded by Rudolf Virchow, a German pathologist, who developed the Virchow method which is one of the main and popular techniques still used by forensic pathologists today. The Virchow method is of doing autopsies as well as instituting cell theory which would shed light on the effects and damage of disease on the human body. Rudolf Virchow began the practice of regulated autopsies where the entire body would be inspected rather than a particular area of interest which would expose additional damage that injuries and ailments inflicted on the human body. In German-speaking Europe, lectures on forensic pathology were regularly held in Freiburg in the mid 18th century and Vienna in 1804. Scientists like Auguste Ambroise Tardieu, Johann Ludwig Casper and Carl Liman made great efforts to develop forensic pathology into a science based on empirics.

Ambroise Paré is also considered one of the fathers of modern forensic pathology and surgery. His inventions in the early 16th century include surgical instruments and techniques. He pioneered battlefield medicine and treatments of wounds. One technique he used was pouring boiling oil into wounds.

This history of forensic pathology can be traced all the way back to the fourth century BC in Babylonia but instead of practicing on deceased human bodies, the practice of forensic pathology was strictly practiced on animals. This was said to be done only to animals since humans during this era were believed to be sacred. Later on, in forensic pathology history, forensic pathology would be practiced among those who live in Asia. Muslim doctors would discover infectious diseases and as a result, would operate on deceased bodies; one of those doctors being Ibn Zuhr. Zuhr would go on to performing autopsies on bodies in postmortem and research diseases such as leprosy, mange, and sexually transmitted diseases.

While Zuhr was busy learning about contagious diseases, Yee Siung, a Chinese government official was assembling a group of physicians who were in charge of dissecting criminal murder victims. These victims’ cause of death would be investigated alongside the actual case itself and this would be the first time pathology would be used to help solve criminal cases.

Forensic pathology was first recognized in the United States by the American Board of Pathology in 1959 after toxicology and pathology had been used to solve thousands of criminal cases worldwide for years.

In Canada, it was formally recognized in 2003, and a formal training program (a fellowship) is currently being established under the auspices of the Royal College of Physicians and Surgeons of Canada.

== Education ==
In most English speaking countries, forensic pathology is a subspecialty of anatomical pathology. Training requirements differ from country to country; however, it is common for pathologists to study at a medical school and then go on to study pathology. Many forensic pathologists practice as a histo (hospital) pathologist before moving on to forensic science. Another requirement for forensic pathologists is having a working knowledge of specific fields of study like toxicology, firearms examination (wound ballistics), trace evidence, forensic serology and DNA technology.

=== Australia ===
There are currently three paths to qualify as a forensic pathologist in Australia. The first is to train solely in forensic pathology (although a significant amount of anatomical pathology knowledge is still required) and pass two examinations for forensic pathology only. The second is to commence training in anatomical pathology, and complete an initial anatomical pathology examination, which takes a minimum of three years; then go on to train solely in forensic pathology and complete a forensic pathology examination, which takes a minimum of two years. The third is to complete a minimum 5 years' training in anatomical pathology to qualify as a fellow in anatomical pathology, then complete a post-fellowship year in forensic pathology (a minimum twelve months further training plus successful completion of an examination).

=== Canada ===
In Canada, individuals must complete an undergraduate science degree, followed by a doctor of medicine degree from one of the seven medical schools in Canada. After these are completed individuals may enter the Royal College of Physicians and Surgeons (RCPSC) which requires the completion of residency training. Anatomical pathology is a five-year residency. Residents who wish to become forensic pathologists must then complete a one-year fellowship in forensic pathology. Forensic pathology is a sub-specialty by the RCPSC. As of 2022, there are three schools in Canada that offer the forensic pathology training program. These schools are the University of Alberta, the University of Ottawa and the University of Toronto. McMaster University ceased their training program in 2019.

=== Germany ===
Once students have acquired the "Abitur" diploma and completed all the requirements, they can study medicine at a university. Within the medical education system, there are four subdivisions individuals must partake in prior to moving into a specialization.

The first section is a two year preclinical study period where individuals are introduced to the basics. A two month work period at a hospital must be completed between each semester in order to become familiar with everyday life in a hospital. A final exam on the basics concludes this portion.

The second section is a one year clinical period to familiarize the students with the basics of clinical practice. The students complete the first part of the physician's exam at the end of this period.

The third section is another clinical period which lasts for two years, which practices non-surgical, surgical, neurological, ecological and general medicine domains. Here is where forensic medicine is first introduced. Between the first and second clinical sections, four months of medical clerkship are required, which consists of two months in a hospital and two months at any other medical institution. Students complete the second part of the physician's exam at the end of this period.

The final section is a one year practical period where students partake in three 4 month practicums: four months of internal medicine, four months of surgery and four months of clinical practical study of their choice. Students write the final part of the physician's exam before this period and have the oral part afterwards.

Once individuals have completed their medical studies, there is a minimum of six extra years of specialization training for forensic pathology. During this training individuals must complete at least three years and six months working for a legal medicine institution, focusing on clinical forensic pathology training. Then, at least one year of pathology work at a specialized institute is required partaking in autopsy technical training. As well, a minimum of 6 months working with forensic psychiatrists is also required. Finally, a single year of work in any field of medicine or legal medicine must be completed. During these work periods, it is required that these physicians write a number of opinions on their post-mortem examinations, crime scene investigations, crime scene reconstructions and insurance medical cases. There is also a minimum number of reports consisting of their own autopsies, police inquiries, histological investigation and other investigative results. Finally, the practicing physician must complete a certain number of oral court proceedings. Once all of this has been completed, an oral examination, overseen by the Chamber of Physicians (also known as the German Medical Association) is to be completed which allows individuals to officially become a forensic pathologist upon completion.

=== India ===
In India, the specialty is commonly referred to as Forensic Medicine and Toxicology, or Legal Medicine. After completion of medical graduation (MBBS), one has to complete three years of study and training including thesis research, which leads to the award of a degree of MD (Forensic Medicine). One can also alternately pass the board examination conducted by the National Board of Examinations, leading to awarding of Diplomate of National Board (DNB).

The majority of the specialists are attached to the Department of Forensic Medicine and Toxicology in various medical colleges. The classification of posts includes Assistant Professor (Lecturer), Associate Professor (Reader), and Professor. The work profile of the specialists includes conducting autopsies and clinical forensic examinations; apart from teaching the medical students. They have to regularly appear in the courts as expert witnesses. A typical department in a government institution conducts 100 to 5,000 autopsies a year depending upon the jurisdiction. Apart from this, clinical forensic examinations constitute a major part of the work and the number of cases can run up to ten thousand a year in an average institution.

The largest association of the specialty is Indian Academy of Forensic Medicine (IAFM), which also publishes its quarterly Journal of Indian Academy of Forensic Medicine regularly. This association has a specialist member strength of more than 1000.

=== Indonesia ===
In Indonesia, forensic medicine, also known as legal medicine ("kedokteran kehakiman"), is a 3-year specialty program that can be taken directly after completing medical school. It is separate from anatomical pathology and clinical pathology. Upon completion of the program, a forensic medicine specialist will obtain the title Spesialis Forensik, or Sp.F. He or she may be addressed in public as Dokter Forensik ("forensic doctor"). Note that there is no pre-medicine program, making the total duration of formal education for one to become a forensic specialist 9 years. It was first introduced through the Dutch colonial criminal justice system in the early twentieth century.

Forensic medicine is also a mandatory round during medical school clerkship. Medical students assist the doctors on autopsies, and they may also be allowed to perform an autopsy under supervision, and to witness in the court.

=== Japan ===
In Japan, the profession of forensic pathology is not commonly pursued compared to other medical professions such as clinicians and doctors. In Japan, there are 33 of 42 universities that have a department of pathology established on their campuses yet, even so, only 21 of the 42 universities offer residency programs pertaining to forensic pathology.

To become a forensic pathologist, it requires individuals to pursue a four year undergraduate degree. After completing their undergraduate career, it is then required for individuals to attend medical school to either earn their Masters or Doctorates degree. After completing medical school, individuals are then required to have 2 years of mandatory postgraduate clinical education where they learn important clinical skills such as communication skills, common laboratory procedures such as Gram’s stain and urinalysis. When the two year mandatory clinical training is completed, another 3-4 years of training is needed to focus more on surgical procedures which is especially for forensic pathologists. During these last 3–4 years of training, forensic pathologists will learn more about specified human anatomy and they will also have the chance to interact with real patients as well as interacting with other forensic pathologists as well. The department of Forensic Medicine at Kyoto University in Japan has a legacy that can be traced back to 1899 when the department of forensic was first founded. The department has been active forces in promoting the significance of forensic medicine through its innovative programs, research, and analysis.

When their training is completed, forensic pathologists in Japan will then have the opportunity to receive their certificate of pathology awarded by the Japanese Society of Pathology

=== United Kingdom ===
In the UK, forensic histopathology is a five/five and a half year training programme, consisting of two and half years of histopathology followed by two and half/three years of forensic histopathology. Successful candidates are eligible for inclusion on the specialist register of the General Medical Council (GMC), which is a requirement to work as a consultant forensic pathologist.

Entry to forensic histopathology specialty training requires completion of the UK Foundation Programme, stages A and B of histopathology specialty training, and a pass in the FRCPath Part 1 examination in histopathology. Candidates are in year 3 of specialty training (ST3) when entering forensic histopathology and progress immediately to stage C. Completion of stages C and D, and a pass in the FRCPath Part 2 examination in forensic histopathology allow the candidate to apply for the Certificate of Completion of Training (CCT).

Another option is to obtain the full FRCPath in general histopathology, followed by another 18–24 months of training in forensic pathology, which will qualify the candidates with either the Diploma of the Royal College of Pathologists in Forensic Pathology (DipRCPath (forensic)) or the Diploma in Medical Jurisprudence (DMJ). In England and Wales, the candidate will also need to be Home Office Accredited, which will require checks of the training portfolio and completion of a security check and the Expert Witness Training Course run by the Forensic Science Service.

Currently approved centres for forensic pathology training in the UK include Belfast, Edinburgh, Liverpool, Leicester, Cardiff, London, Glasgow and Dundee. Not all the posts are currently actively training.

=== United States ===
In the United States, forensic pathologists typically complete at least one year of additional training (a fellowship) after completing an anatomical pathology residency and having passed the "board" examination administered by The American Board of Pathology or The American Osteopathic Board of Pathology ("board-certified"). Becoming an anatomic pathologist in the United States requires completing a residency in anatomic pathology, which is on-the-job training one must perform upon completing medical school before one may practice unsupervised. Anatomic pathology (as it is called) by itself is a three-year residency. Most U.S. pathologists complete a combined residency in both anatomic and clinical pathology, which requires a total of four years.

In the United States, all told, the education after high school is typically 13–15 years in duration (4 years of undergraduate training + 4 years of medical school + 4–5 years of residency [anatomic and clinical pathology combined] + 1–2 years of forensic pathology fellowship). Generally, the biggest hurdle is gaining admission to medical school, although the pass rate for anatomic and forensic pathology board examinations (in the U.S.) is approximately 80-90 and 90-100 percent, respectively. The courts do not require the American Board of Pathology certification in order for a witness to be qualified as an expert in the field of forensic pathology, and there are several "diploma mills" that give online certificates in the field.

== In popular culture ==
Pathologists often feature in crime fiction. The following television series are listed alphabetically by the character's name:

- Dr. Nikki Alexander, forensic pathologist (since Series 8) and the primary character since Series 24 in the British crime drama series Silent Witness.
- Dr George Bullard of Causton in Midsomer Murders.
- Jordan Cavanaugh M.D. is a forensic pathologist in the Massachusetts Office of the Chief Medical Examiner, in the series Crossing Jordan.
- Dr. Ravi Chakrabarti, Medical Examiner with the King County Medical Examiner's Office, in the series iZombie.
- Dr. Max Debryn, Home Office forensic pathologist in detective series Endeavour and Inspector Morse.
- Dr. Laura Hobson, pathologist and eventual love interest of D.I. Robbie Lewis in later episodes of Inspector Morse and in Lewis.
- Dr. Maura Isles, Chief Medical Examiner of the Commonwealth of Massachusetts, in the series Rizzoli & Isles.
- Isabelle Lightwood, said to be the best forensic pathologist in New York, in the TV series Shadowhunters.
- Dr. Donald "Ducky" Mallard, the Chief Medical Examiner for the NCIS Major Case Response Team in NCIS.
- Dr. Misumi Mikoto, a forensic pathologist at the fictional Unnatural Death Investigation Laboratory (UDI Lab) in Tokyo, is the protagonist of the Japanese drama Unnatural (2018).
- Sven Nyberg, Ystad Police Department's forensic pathologist in the Swedish and British TV series Wallander.
- Dr. James "Jimmy" Palmer, former Medical Examiner Assistant and now Chief Medical Examiner (after Dr. Mallard's retirement) in NCIS.
- Dr. Marco Pasquano, Vigàta's local forensic pathologist in the Italian series Inspector Montalbano.
- Dr. R. Quincy, Chief medical examiner for Los Angeles County in the US TV series Quincy, M.E.
- Dr. Samantha Ryan, forensic pathologist, the primary character (Series 1–8) in the British crime drama series Silent Witness.
- Dr. Camille Saroyan, head of the Forensic Division of the Jeffersonian in Bones.
- Ambrose Spellman, coroner for the Spellman Sisters' Mortuary and main character in the Netflix supernatural horror series Chilling Adventures of Sabrina.

== See also ==
- Forensic science
- Post-mortem chemistry

== Sources ==
- Bartos, Leah, "No Forensic Background? No Problem", ProPublica, April 17, 2012.
- Oliver, W. R., Fudenberg, J., Howe, J. A., & Thomas, L. C. (2015). Cognitive Bias in Medicolegal Death Investigation. Academic Forensic Pathology, 5(4), 548–560. https://doi.org/10.23907/2015.060
- Payne-James, Jason; et al., eds. (2005). Encyclopedia of Forensic & Legal Medicine. Amsterdam; Boston: Elsevier Academic Press. ISBN 0-12-547970-0. OCLC 60834620.
- Payne-James, Jason; Busuttil, Anthony; Smock, William S. (2003). Forensic Medicine: Clinical and Pathological Aspects. London; San Francisco: Greenwich Medical Media. ISBN 1-84110-026-9. OCLC 51678652.
- Saukko, Pekka J.; Knight, Bernard (2004). Knight's Forensic Pathology (3rd ed.). London: Edward Arnold (Publishers). ISBN 0-340-76044-3. OCLC 56440239.
- Spitz, Werner U.; Spitz, Daniel J. (2006). Spitz and Fisher's Medicolegal Investigation of Death: Guidelines for the Application of Pathology to Crime Investigation (4th ed.). Springfield, Ill.: Charles C. Thomas Publisher. ISBN 0-398-07544-1. OCLC 56614481.
- The Real CSI, PBS Frontline documentary, April 17, 2012
- Syukriani, Yoni Fuadah; Novita, Nita; Sunjaya, Deni K. (1 August 2018). "Development of forensic medicine in post reform Indonesia". Journal of Forensic and Legal Medicine. 58: 56–63. doi:10.1016/j.jflm.2018.05.001. PMID 29751222. S2CID 21709263.
- https://www.med.kyoto-u.ac.jp/en/organization-staff/research/doctoral_course/r-011/
- University of Ottawa. "Department of Pathology and Laboratory Medicine". med.uottawa.ca. https://med.uottawa.ca/pathology/education/postgraduate-medical-education/forensic-pathology-residency-training-program Retrieved 2022-03-28.
