= American Board of Anesthesiology =

The American Board of Anesthesiology
- Founded: 1941
- Purpose: Anesthesiology
- Headquarters: Raleigh, North Carolina
- Key people: Dr Mark A. Rockoff
- Website: http://www.theaba.org/

The American Board of Anesthesiology sets standards and exams for the accreditation of Board certified anesthesiologists coming to the end of their residency. It is one of the 24 medical specialty boards that constitutes the American Board of Medical Specialties.

== Former Directors include ==
- Rolland John Whitacre: famous for his design of a subarachnoid needle tip
- Edward Boyce Tuohy: famous for his design of an epidural needle

== See also ==
- American Osteopathic Board of Anesthesiology
