= American Osteopathic Board of Neuromusculoskeletal Medicine =

- Abbreviation: AOBNMM
- Formation: 1977
- Type: Professional
- Headquarters: Chicago, Illinois
- Coordinates: 39.9204°N 86.2226°W
- Chair: Barbara Zajdel, DO, FAAO
- Vice Chairman: Ryan Seals, DO
- Website: aobnmm.org

The American Osteopathic Board of Neuromusculoskeletal Medicine (AOBNMM) is an organization that provides board certification to qualified Doctors of Osteopathic Medicine (DO), and Medical Doctors (MD) in the medical specialty of osteopathic neuromusculoskeletal medicine (ONMM). The AOBNMM is one of 18 medical specialty certifying boards of the American Osteopathic Association Bureau of Osteopathic Specialists approved by the American Osteopathic Association (AOA). As of December 2022, over 1000 osteopathic physicians hold active certification with the AOBNMM.

The AOBNMM also offers a Certificate of Added Qualification in Sports Medicine.

== Board certification ==
Certification is potentially available to physicians who have completed residency training in osteopathic neuromusculoskeletal medicine/osteopathic manipulative medicine (NMM/OMM) and hold an active license to practice medicine in any US state, territory, or Canada. Successful completion of written, oral, and practical examinations is also required for certification.

Board certification in neuromusculoskeletal medicine/osteopathic manipulative medicine (NMM/OMM) is required of physicians to chair an osteopathic manipulative medicine department at a medical school or to serve as a director for an ONMM residency program. Since 1995, diplomates of the American Osteopathic Board of Neuromusculoskeletal Medicine must participate in Longitudinal Assessment yearly to avoid inactivation of their board certification status.

== See also ==
- AOA Bureau of Osteopathic Specialists
