= American Osteopathic Board of Proctology =

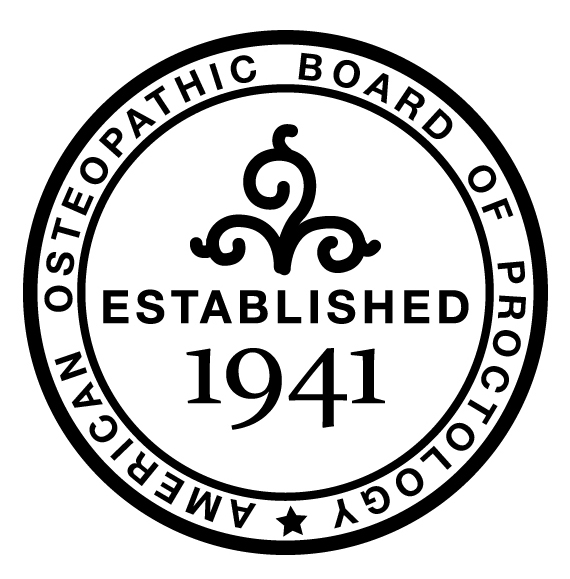
- Abbreviation: AOBPR
- Formation: 1941
- Type: Professional
- Headquarters: Chicago, IL
- Coordinates: 41.8942°N 87.61902°W
- Board Member: Steven Grothaus, DO
- Board Member: Paul Broderick, DO
- Board Member: Timothy Goshen, DO
- Board Member: Jim Hodge, DO

The American Osteopathic Board of Proctology (AOBPR) is an organization that provides board certification to qualified Doctors of Osteopathic Medicine (D.O.) who specialize in the medical and surgical treatment of disorders of the anus, colon, and rectum of the gastrointestinal tract (proctologists). The board is one of 18 medical specialty certifying boards of the American Osteopathic Association Bureau of Osteopathic Specialists approved by the American Osteopathic Association (AOA), and was established in 1941. As of April 2011, there were 25 osteopathic proctologists certified by the AOBPR.

== Board certification ==
To become board certified in proctology, candidates must have completed an AOA-approved residency in proctology and one year of practice as a licensed proctologist. Additionally, candidates must have completed the required oral and written examinations. Since 2004, board-certified osteopathic proctologists must renew their certification every ten years to avoid expiration of their board-certified status. Physicians certified by the AOBPR are known as fellows of the American Osteopathic College of Proctology.

== See also ==
- American Osteopathic Association Bureau of Osteopathic Specialists
