= American Board of Physical Medicine and Rehabilitation =

US certification organization

The American Board of Physical Medicine and Rehabilitation (ABPMR) was established in 1947 as the certifying body for the field of physical medicine and rehabilitation under the American Board of Medical Specialties (ABMS). It is one of two certifying boards, along with the American Osteopathic Board of Physical Medicine and Rehabilitation, to certify physiatrists in the United States. The Board certifies physicians with Doctor of Osteopathic Medicine (D.O.) and Doctor of Medicine (M.D.) degrees.
