= American Board of Psychiatry and Neurology =

American not-for-profit corporation

American Board of Psychiatry and Neurology, Inc.
- Abbreviation: ABPN
- Formation: 1934; 92 years ago
- Type: Professional association
- Headquarters: Deerfield, Illinois
- Location: United States
- Official language: English
- Chair: Amy Brooks-Kayal, M.D.
- Vice Chair: Robert J. Boland, M.D.
- President/CEO: Jeffrey M. Lyness, M.D.
- Website: abpn.org

The American Board of Psychiatry and Neurology, Inc. (ABPN) is a not-for-profit corporation founded in 1934 following conferences of committees appointed by the American Psychiatric Association, the American Neurological Association, and the then "Section on Nervous and Mental Diseases" of the American Medical Association. This action was taken as a method of identifying qualified specialists in psychiatry and neurology. The ABPN is one of 24 member boards of the American Board of Medical Specialties.

== Organization ==
The Board of Directors consists of sixteen voting members. Elections to fill the places of members whose terms have expired take place annually. Neurology and psychiatry are represented on the board. It is independently incorporated.

== Certificates ==
In addition to the specialties of psychiatry, neurology, and neurology with a special qualification in child neurology, the ABPN (sometimes in collaboration with other member boards) has sought from the ABMS and gained approval for recognition of 15 sub-specialties, as listed below:

- addiction psychiatry
- brain injury medicine
- child and adolescent psychiatry
- clinical neurophysiology
- consultation-liaison psychiatry
- epilepsy
- forensic psychiatry
- geriatric psychiatry
- hospice and palliative medicine
- neurocritical care
- neurodevelopmental disabilities
- neuromuscular medicine
- pain medicine
- sleep medicine
- vascular neurology
