= American Board of Obstetrics and Gynecology =

American medical certification board

- Abbreviation: ABOG
- Formation: 1927
- Tax ID no.: 34-0787715
- Headquarters: Dallas, Texas
- Executive Director: Amy Young, MD
- Associate Executive Director: Kenneth Kim, MD, MHPE
- President: George Macones, MD
- Parent organization: American Board of Medical Specialties
- Website: www.abog.org

The American Board of Obstetrics and Gynecology (ABOG) is a non-profit organization that provides board certification for practicing obstetricians and gynecologists in the United States and Canada. It was founded in 1927, incorporated in 1930, and is based in Dallas, Texas. It is one of 24 medical boards recognized by the American Board of Medical Specialties. ABOG's mission is to define the standards, certify obstetricians and gynecologists, and facilitate continuous learning to advance knowledge, practice, and professionalism in women's health.

== History ==
ABOG moved from Seattle, Washington, to Dallas, Texas, in the 1990s, where it purchased a permanent office building. It was one of the first medical certification boards to move its oral certifying exams from hotels to a professional testing center.

The board was the center of controversy in 2013 when it issued a directive requiring its certified OB-GYNs to not treat male patients in order to retain their certification. This directive allowed OB GYNs to treat men only in a small number of situations, such as if the man was involved in "active government service" or was undergoing a fertility evaluation. The board partially reversed its decision in response to criticism later that year, and the following January, it eliminated restrictions on its diplomates' abilities to treat men.

In 2014, the first female board president, Deborah A. Driscoll, was elected. She served until 2018 and was followed as president by Andrew J. Satin.

== Certifications offered ==
ABOG offers board certification in Obstetrics and Gynecology, as well as five subspecialties.

- Obstetrics and Gynecology: An OB GYN treats women's health, including diagnosis and treatment of the female reproductive system and more. They focus on the health of women before, during, and after childbearing years, diagnosing and treating conditions of the reproductive system and associated disorders.
- Complex Family Planning: An OB GYN who obtains a subspecialty certification in Complex Family Planning diagnoses and treats patients with medically- and surgically complex conditions. These subspecialists consult with OB GYN specialists and other clinicians to provide an advanced level of care for improving the reproductive health of women facing medically challenging situations.
- Female Pelvic Medicine and Reconstructive Surgery: An OB GYN or Urologist who obtains a subspecialty certification in Female Pelvic Medicine and Reconstructive Surgery provides consultations and comprehensive management of women with complex benign pelvic conditions, lower urinary tract disorders, and pelvic floor dysfunctions. Comprehensive management includes diagnostic and therapeutic procedures necessary for the total care of the patient with these conditions and complications resulting from them. Skills include, but are not limited to: complex gynecologic care, minimally invasive surgery, pelvic floor gynecologic care, urogynecology, and vaginal surgery.
- Gynecologic Oncology: An OB GYN who obtains a subspecialty certification in Gynecologic Oncology provides consultation and comprehensive management, including diagnostic and therapeutic procedures with gynecologic cancer and resulting complications. Skills include, but are not limited to: chemotherapy, gynecologic care, gynecologic oncology, and minimally invasive gynecologic surgery.
- Maternal-Fetal Medicine: An OB GYN who obtains a subspecialty certification in Maternal-Fetal Medicine focuses on patients with pregnancy complications and their effects on both the mother and the fetus. Skills include, but are not limited to: detailed obstetrical ultrasounds, high risk pregnancy management, obstetrical care, perinatal genetic counseling, and prenatal diagnosis.
- Reproductive Endocrinology and Infertility: An OB GYN who obtains a subspecialty certification in Reproductive Endocrinology and Infertility concentrates on hormonal functioning as it pertains to reproduction as well as the issue of fertility. They are also trained to evaluate and treat hormonal dysfunction in women outside of infertility. Skills include, but are not limited to: assisted reproductive technology, male and female infertility, minimally invasive gynecologic surgery, and reproductive endocrinology.

== Process to become ABOG-certified ==
To become certified in Obstetrics and Gynecology by ABOG, a physician must complete the following:

1. Earn a medical degree (M.D. or D.O.)
2. Complete an ACMGE-accredited residency program
3. Pass the Qualifying Exam in Obstetrics and Gynecology (written exam)
4. Prepare a case list
5. Pass the Certifying Exam in Obstetrics and Gynecology (oral exam)

To become certified by ABOG in one of the five related subspecialties, a physician must complete the following steps:

1. Maintain and earn OB GYN certification
2. Complete an ACGME-accredited fellowship program
3. Pass the Subspecialty Qualifying Exam (written exam)
4. Prepare case list and complete thesis
5. Pass the Subspecialty Certifying Exam (oral exam)

== Maintenance of certification ==
Physicians certified by ABOG after 1986 must maintain their certification(s) by participating in the annual Maintenance of Certification (MOC) program. Physicians complete six-year cycles.

In Year 1–5, certified physician must complete the following requirements:

- Professionalism and Professional Standing: Acting in patients' best interest, behaving professionally with patients, families, and colleagues across health professions, taking appropriate care of yourself, and representing board certification and MOC status in a professional manner
- Lifelong Learning and Self-Assessment: Ongoing participation in high-quality learning activities where physicians read 30 articles from peer-reviewed literature on clinically relevant patient-management information, best-practice guidelines, and research and answer questions
- Practice Improvement: Activities that result in improved patient or population health outcomes, access to health care, and patient experience (including patient satisfaction) and increased value in the health care system

In Year 6, certified physicians must complete the Professionalism and Professional Standing and Lifelong Learning and Self-Assessment requirements, as well as the following additional requirement

- Assessment of Knowledge, Judgement, and Skills: A secure computer-based exam administered at testing centers across the United States
