= American Board of Pediatrics =

One of the 24 certifying boards of the American Board of Medical Specialties

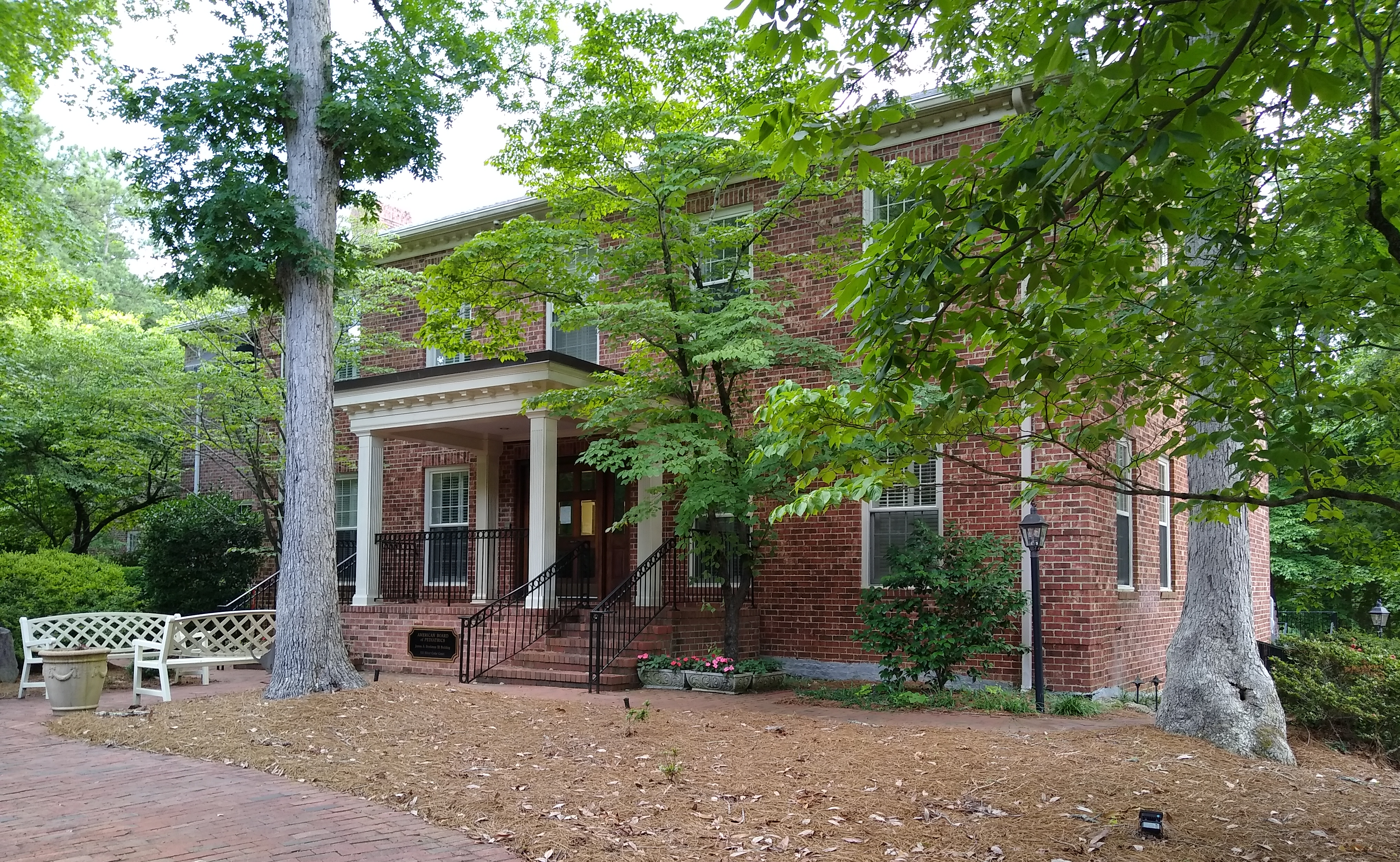
- Founded: November 20, 1933; 92 years ago
- Tax ID no.: 23-1417504
- Legal status: 501(c)(3) as of August 7, 2015 (previously 501(c)(6))
- Headquarters: Chapel Hill, North Carolina, United States
- Coordinates: 35.962654°N 79.050161°W
- Chair: DeWayne M. Pursley, MD, MPH
- Interim President and CEO: John A. Barnard, MD
- Subsidiaries: American Board of Pediatrics Foundation
- Revenue: $30,468,233 (2015)
- Expenses: $29,799,856 (2015)
- Employees: 110 (2014)
- Volunteers: 250 (2014)
- Website: www.abp.org

The American Board of Pediatrics (ABP) was founded in 1933. It is one of the 24 certifying boards of the American Board of Medical Specialties (ABMS). The ABP is an independent and nonprofit organization. The ABP's mission is to advance child health by certifying pediatricians who meet standards of excellence and are committed to continuous learning and improvement.

== Certificates awarded ==
The ABP awards certificates in the following pediatric subspecialty areas:

- General Pediatrics
- Adolescent Medicine
- Cardiology
- Child Abuse Pediatrics
- Critical Care Medicine
- Developmental-Behavioral Pediatrics
- Emergency Medicine
- Endocrinology
- Gastroenterology
- Hematology-Oncology
- Hospital Medicine
- Infectious Diseases
- Neonatal-Perinatal Medicine
- Nephrology
- Pulmonology
- Rheumatology

The American Board of Pediatrics also awards certificates in conjunction with other specialty boards. Those certificates include:

- Hospice and Palliative Medicine
- Medical Toxicology
- Pediatric Transplant Hepatology
- Sleep Medicine
- Sports Medicine

Additionally, from 2001-2007, the ABP awarded certificates in Neurodevelopmental Disabilities.

== History ==
In 1933, the American Pediatric Society, the American Academy of Pediatrics, and the American Medical Association formed the American Board of Pediatrics for the purpose of examining and awarding certification to physicians who have superior knowledge in the field of the diseases of childhood.
