= American Board of Medical Specialties =

Non-profit organization

- Abbreviation: ABMS
- Formation: 1933
- Type: Professional association
- Headquarters: Chicago, Illinois
- Location: United States
- Official language: English
- Chair: Michael L. Carius
- Chair-Elect: Rebecca L. Johnson
- Secretary-Treasurer: Susan M. Ramin
- President/CEO: Richard E. Hawkins
- Website: www.abms.org

The American Board of Medical Specialties (ABMS) is a non-profit organization established in 1933 which represents 24 broad areas of specialty medicine. ABMS is the largest and most widely recognized physician-led specialty certification organization in the United States. The other certification organizations in the United States are the American Board of Physician Specialties (recognized in parts of the United States) and American Osteopathic Association Bureau of Osteopathic Specialists.

ABMS Member Boards have maintained a rigorous process for the evaluation and board certification of medical specialists, though none of the processes have been confirmed by independent third-party review. They certify specialists in more than 150 medical specialties and subspecialties. More than 80 percent of practicing physicians in the United States have achieved Board Certification by one or more of the ABMS Member Boards. The Member Boards support lifelong learning by physicians through the ABMS Maintenance of Certification (ABMS MOC) program. ABMS also collaborates with other professional medical organizations and agencies to set standards for graduate medical school education and accreditation of residency programs. ABMS makes information available to the public about the Board Certification of physicians and their participation in the ABMS MOC program.

== Background ==
Since 1934, specialty boards were considered for membership in ABMS according to the standards set in the "Essentials for Approval of Examining Boards in Medical Specialties" created by ABMS and the American Medical Association Council on Medical Education (AMA/CME). In 1948, these efforts were formalized through the establishment of the Liaison Committee for Specialty Boards (LCSB), which is made up of representatives from ABMS and AMA/CME. Broadly stated, a medical specialty examining board must:

1. represent a distinct and well-defined field of medical practice;
2. solely offer a single standard of preparation for and evaluation of expertise;
3. offer distinct training to meet certification requirements;
4. demonstrate that candidates for certification will acquire, and then maintain, knowledge and skills in that field;
5. establish defined standards for training and a system for evaluation of educational program quality; and
6. demonstrate support from the relevant field of medical practice and broad professional support.

== Steps toward initial certification and MOC ==
Board Certification and the ABMS Program for Maintenance of Certification (ABMS MOC®) are highly visible indicators that physicians know today's standards of practice. The ABMS Program for MOC activities emphasize ongoing professional development and assessment that is aligned with other professional expectations and requirements within health care.

The information below provides an overview of the requirements for initial Board Certification and MOC. To learn more about the requirements for a specific specialty, contact the particular ABMS Member Board.

== Initial certification ==
Physicians can demonstrate their expertise in a medical specialty by earning Board Certification through one of the 24 ABMS Member Boards. Before physicians can become Board Certified, however, they must first:

- Finish four years of premedical education in a college or university;
- Earn a medical degree (MD, DO or other credential approved by an ABMS Member Board) from a qualified medical school;
- Complete three to five years of full-time experience in a residency training program accredited by the Accreditation Council for Graduate Medical Education (ACGME);
- Provide letters of attestation from their program director and/or faculty;
- Obtain an unrestricted medical license to practice medicine in the United States or Canada; and
- Pass a written and, in some cases, an oral examination created and administered by an ABMS Member Board.

== Maintenance of certification ==
Once Board Certified, physicians maintain their medical specialty skills by participating in a continuous professional development program called the ABMS Program for MOC. The MOC program provides physicians an approach for enhancing patient care and improving patient outcomes through assessment and improvement activities.

The ABMS Program for MOC involves ongoing measurement of six core competencies defined by ABMS and ACGME:

- Practice-based Learning and Improvement
- Patient Care and Procedural Skills
- Systems-based Practice
- Medical Knowledge
- Interpersonal and Communication Skills
- Professionalism

These competencies, which are the same ones used in the ACGME's Next Accreditation System, are measured in the ABMS Program for MOC within a four-part framework:

- Part I: Professionalism and Professional Standing
- Part II: Lifelong Learning and Self-Assessment
- Part III: Assessment of Knowledge, Judgment, and Skills
- Part IV: Improvement in Medical Practice

All Programs for MOC implemented by the Member Boards measure the same six competencies within the same four-part framework. While these elements are consistent across all Member Boards, what may vary, according to the specialty, are the specific activities the Member Boards use to measure these competencies. Despite some variation in the activities, they are all built upon evidence-based guidelines, national clinical and quality standards, and specialty best practices.

== ABMS Member Boards ==
ABMS was incorporated in 1933. This list shows the year each board was approved as an ABMS Member Board.

Founding Members

- American Board of Dermatology
- American Board of Obstetrics and Gynecology
- American Board of Ophthalmology
- American Board of Otolaryngology

1935

- American Board of Orthopaedic Surgery
- American Board of Pediatrics
- American Board of Psychiatry and Neurology
- American Board of Radiology
- American Board of Urology

1936

- American Board of Internal Medicine
- American Board of Pathology

1937

- American Board of Surgery

1940

- American Board of Neurological Surgery

1941

- American Board of Anesthesiology
- American Board of Plastic Surgery

1947

- American Board of Physical Medicine and Rehabilitation

1949

- American Board of Colon and Rectal Surgery
- American Board of Preventive Medicine

1969

- American Board of Family Medicine

1971

- American Board of Allergy and Immunology
- American Board of Nuclear Medicine
- American Board of Thoracic Surgery

1979

- American Board of Emergency Medicine

1991

- American Board of Medical Genetics and Genomics

== See also ==
- American Board of Physician Specialties
- American Osteopathic Association Bureau of Osteopathic Specialists
- Board certification
- American Board of Obesity Medicine
- Fellowship (medicine)
- Residency (medicine)
