= Board certification =

Process to demonstrate mastery of basic knowledge

Board certification is the process by which a physician, veterinarian, or other professional demonstrates a mastery of advanced knowledge and skills through written, oral, practical, or simulator-based testing.

== Certification bodies ==
There are more than 25 boards that certify physician specialists in the United States. Although there is no legal requirement for a physician to attain it, some hospitals may demand that physicians be board certified to receive privileges.

The commonly used acronym BE/BC (board eligible/board certified) refers to a doctor who is eligible or is certified to practice medicine in a particular field.

The term board certified is also used in the nursing field, where a candidate with advanced mastery of a nursing specialty can also become eligible to be Board Certified. Board certification is also used in the field of pharmacy, where a pharmacist in the United States can be recognized in specialized areas of advanced pharmacy practice after fulfilling eligibility requirements and passing a certification examination by the Board of Pharmacy Specialties or the National Board of Medication Therapy Management. Doctoral-level psychologists (Ph.D., or Psy.D.) may also be board certified by the American Board of Professional Psychology, the American Board of Professional Neuropsychology, or the American Board of Pediatric Neuropsychology.

The FDA encourages board certification of all toxicologists who work in the pharmaceutical and biotechnology industries, especially of those who oversee preclinical product safety studies. The American Board of Toxicology is the oldest and largest certification body in the world to ensure the competency of toxicologists involved in preclinical drug discovery.

Board certification is available to a licensed attorney (J.D.) in the United States as well, although it generally is not considered a form of licensure and usually does not confer additional privileges of any kind. Many state bar associations, including Arizona, California, Florida, Louisiana, New Mexico, North Carolina, Ohio, South Carolina, Tennessee, and Texas, offer board certification in various specialty areas, such as admiralty law, civil trial law, estate planning (or wills, trusts, and estates) law, family (and/or marital) law, immigration law, and tax law. Other organizations also offer certification, with some being accredited by the American Bar Association. The American Bar Association's Standing Committee on Specialization offers extensive resources to attorneys and consumers.

At least one state allows board certified attorneys to use an acronym similar to board-certified doctors: The Florida Bar allows its certified attorneys to use the acronym B.C.S. to identify themselves as a "Board Certified Specialist" and prohibits attorneys not holding board certification from identifying themselves as "experts" or "specialists" (though a non-certified attorney may advertise that he or she "specializes" in one or more areas).

== Defining a medical specialty ==
The core body of knowledge that defines an area of medical specialization is referred to as the core competencies for that specialty. Core competencies are developed through detailed review of the medical literature combined with review by recognized experts from established medical specialties, experts within the new area of specialization and experts from outside the medical profession. This list of core knowledge and skills is then compiled into a draft core competency document.

Once the core competency document is drafted, the certifying organization and its associated professional academy, college or society review the document against the existing literature and again solicit expert opinion regarding the domains of competence and areas of competency contained in the document. The core competencies are next formatted using a psychometric taxonomy such as Bloom's Taxonomy based on the core competencies required by physicians practicing in the area of specialization as non-specialists and as specialists or sub-specialists. Development of the first core competency document takes five to ten years and is a prerequisite to creating the certification examination.

== Certification examinations ==
Physicians seeking board certification in a given area of specialty must successfully complete and pass an examination process designed to test their mastery of the minimum knowledge and skills contained in the core competency document. Prior to taking the examination, a physician must graduate with a degree, either MD, DO or DPM and meet all other prerequisites to certification as set out by the certifying agency or "board."

The examination itself may consist of one or more parts. Traditionally, an exhaustive written examination is required of all candidates for board certifications in any specialty. While written examinations are adequate measures of basic knowledge, they do not test the mastery of skills or the application of knowledge as well. Many specialties have over the decades attempted to evaluate skills through "practical" examinations using "model" patients (actors) or by observing the physician candidate in a clinical environment. The practical examination has been criticized for being subjective and irreproducible even in the hands of an experienced examiner. As a result, computerized animatronic human patient simulator-based examinations are now being adopted. The traditional written examination is also rapidly being replaced by computer-based testing.

The certification application and examination process for physicians is similar to the process for attorneys. Most state bar associations and organizations approved by the American Bar Association to certify attorneys in a particular area of law generally require five or more years of practice in that area, a minimum number of continuing legal education credits in that area, and references from peer attorneys, judges, or others qualified to comment on the attorney applicant's certification candidacy. Examinations vary, but many utilize multiple choice and essay questions to test the attorney's substantive knowledge and experience. For example, the Texas Board of Legal Specialization generally administers a six-hour examination consisting of three hours of essay questions in the morning and three hours of multiple choice questions in the afternoon, although the format varies based on the area of specialty.

== Certifying agencies for physicians ==
Board certification is overseen by different agencies and organizations throughout the world. In most cases, these organizations are not only specific to a particular type of physician training, but a specific country or group of countries. There are three agencies or organizations in the United States which collectively oversee the certification of M.D.s and D.O.s in the 26 recognized medical specialties. These organizations are the American Board of Medical Specialties (ABMS) and the American Medical Association; the American Osteopathic Association Bureau of Osteopathic Specialists (AOABOS) and the American Osteopathic Association; the American Board of Physician Specialties (ABPS) and the American Association of Physician Specialists. AOABOS and ABPS each have associated with national medical organizations functioning as an umbrella for its various specialty academies, colleges and societies (see table). The American Board of Medical Specialties represents the largest of these organizations, with over 800,000 US physicians having received certification from one or more of its 24-member Boards. The ABMS is not affiliated with any medical society. ABPS is recognized by most states, however, there are some states where physicians are not, by law, allowed to call themselves "board certified" if the specialty designation is from their boards. Additionally, there are alternative national medical boards, i.e. the National Board of Physicians and Surgeons, with over 10,000 board-certified physicians, that meet national quality standards, including the Joint Commission, the National Committee on Quality Assurance, and the Utilization Review Accreditation Commission, and has gained acceptance by accredited health plans. However, there is controversy with the medical boards certification and re-certification process, and more competition among medical boards' certification agencies have been addressed by a growing number of states and the US Department of Justice.

| Certifying board | National organization | Physician type |
|---|---|---|
| ABMS | no-affiliation | M.D. and D.O. |
| ABPS | AAPS | M.D. and D.O. |
| AOABOS | American Osteopathic Association | D.O. only |
| NBPAS | no-affiliation | M.D. and D.O. |

Although controversial as of methods used, many legacy boards of certification now require that physicians demonstrate, by examination, continuing mastery of the core knowledge and skills for their chosen specialty with recertification of various durations by specialty, between every 7 and every 10 years. More contemporary boards require demonstration of accredited continuing education and maintenance of institutional professional privileges.

== Certifying agencies for attorneys ==
Most state bar associations restrict their licensed attorneys from advertising that they are certified, experts, or specialists in a particular area of law unless they are either (a) certified by the state bar association or (b) certified by an organization approved by the American Bar Association. This approach generally follows Rule 7.4 of the American Bar Association's Model Rules of Professional Conduct. The American Bar Association's Standing Committee on Specialization lists specialty certification programs, including state bar associations and the specialty areas offered for certification purposes.

ABA Model Rule 7.4(b) specifically allows patent attorneys to advertise their specialty, and Rule 7.4(c) allows admiralty lawyers to do so. In the case of patent attorneys, admission to practice before the patent division of the United States Patent and Trademark Office requires that the attorney pass a federally administered examination.

== Specialty colleges ==
Medical specialty colleges are societies that represent specialist physicians. Any physician may join these organizations, though most require board certification in order to become a fellow of the college and use the respective post-nominal letters. Similarly, legal specialty colleges are societies that represent specialist lawyers. Fellows of a particular legal specialty college might or might not be board certified. The American College of Trust and Estate Counsel, which was originally known as the American College of Probate Counsel, is one of the oldest legal specialty colleges, although the American College of Trial Lawyers was founded a year later (1950).

== Criticism ==
While medical licensing in general has been criticized, the board certification process itself has generated a number of controversies and debates. Since many certification boards have begun requiring periodic re-examination, critics in newspapers such as The New York Times have decried board certification exams as being "its own industry", costing doctors thousands of dollars each time and serving to enrich testing and prep companies rather than improving the quality of the profession. Some also have reported that testing has evolved into a more generalized examination, where a significant portion of the test is not relevant to the specialty a given doctor practices, and thus passing rates are much lower.

== See also ==
- Board examination
- American Board of Obesity Medicine
