= Kansas City University =

American osteopathic medical school

- Former names: Kansas City College of Osteopathy and Surgery; Kansas City College of Osteopathic Medicine; University of Health Sciences; Kansas City University of Medicine and Biosciences
- Type: Private medical and professional school
- Established: 1916
- President: Marc B. Hahn
- Provost: Abiodun Akinwuntan
- Executive Dean of the College of Osteopathic Medicine: W. Joshua Cox
- Faculty: 54
- Students: 1571
- Location: Kansas City, Missouri; Joplin, Missouri, U.S.
- Campus: Kansas City: Urban, 23 acres Joplin: Rural
- Nickname: KCU
- Website: www.kansascity.edu

Kansas City University (KCU) is a private medical school with its main campus in the historic Pendleton Heights neighborhood of Kansas City, Missouri and an additional campus in Joplin, Missouri. It was founded in 1916 as one of the original osteopathic medical schools in the United States. It consists of a College of Osteopathic Medicine and a College of Biosciences. KCU is one of the largest medical schools in the nation by enrollment.

In 2017, KCU opened the Farber-McIntire campus, in Joplin, Missouri. The university started a College of Dental Medicine on its Joplin campus in 2023.

KCU is accredited by the Higher Learning Commission and recognized by the Coordinating Board of Higher Education for the Missouri Department of Higher Education. The College of Osteopathic Medicine is accredited by the American Osteopathic Association's Commission on Osteopathic College Accreditation.

== History ==
KCU opened in May 1916 as the Kansas City College of Osteopathy and Surgery. At the time, it was the fifth osteopathic medical school to be established. In January 1921, the college moved its campus to Kansas City's Historic Northeast neighborhood. The Kansas City Campus occupies the original site of Children's Mercy Hospital. In 1940, the Kansas City College of Osteopathy and Surgery took over the assets of the Central College of Osteopathy in Kansas City, Missouri.

In November 1970, the name of the college was changed to the Kansas City College of Osteopathic Medicine, and again in July 1980 to the University of Health Sciences. In 1999, KCU joined with seven other research institutions to form the Kansas City Area Life Sciences Institute, now known as BioNexus KC. As a founding partner and stakeholder institution, KCU has provided biomedical research opportunities within the greater Kansas City area.

In 2004, the College of Biosciences opened and the university's name was changed to Kansas City University of Medicine and Biosciences. The first students in the College of Biosciences began coursework in the fall of 2005, working towards a one-year master's degree in biomedical sciences. The College of Biosciences later expanded the program to a two-year master's degree. In 2008, the college began offering a Master of Arts in bioethics. Currently, Kansas City University offers two Master of Science programs in Biomedical Sciences: a one-year intensive track for the Master of Science in Biomedical Sciences and a two-year research track for a Master of Science in Biomedical Science Research.

In 2009, the president of the university, Karen Pletz, pursued the possibility of offering a dual DO-MD degree. The idea of a dual DO-MD degree was very controversial and raised concerns within the osteopathic medical community. Several leaders of the profession formally requested the option be abandoned. Pletz was subsequently fired, but refrained from discussing the details of her dismissal as a lawsuit was underway. The lawsuit and firing related to financial disagreements between Pletz and the university. Later that day, Pletz filed a countersuit against the school for alleged wrongful termination. Pletz was indicted by federal prosecutors on March 31, 2011, for embezzling $1.5 million from KCU. Pletz committed suicide on November 22, 2011, in Fort Lauderdale, Florida, before the case went to trial.

In January 2014, the university announced a $60 million expansion plan which included a clinical training center, offices, classrooms, and a medical simulation building. As part of this expansion, the university began construction of the Center for Medical Education Innovation (CMEI) on the Kansas City Campus in 2018. This $33 million, 56,000 square feet (5,200 m^{2}) facility includes standardized patient exam rooms, a skills simulation deck similar to many hospital environments, and an advanced osteopathic skills lab. The CMEI opened in 2020.

In 2016, the university broke ground on a second campus in Joplin, Missouri. The first class of medical students on the Joplin Campus began instruction in 2017. The university expanded the Joplin Campus to include a College of Dental Medicine, which offers a 4-year DMD degree.

In 2020, the university was renamed Kansas City University to more accurately reflect the comprehensive health sciences programs available.

In 2023, the university opened the doors of its College of Dental Medicine based at the Joplin, MO campus. The KCU-CDM received initial accreditation in February 2022 from the Commission on Dental Accreditation (CODA). The first class will graduate the 4-year dental program in Spring 2027.

== Academics ==
KCU offers graduate degrees in osteopathic medicine, biomedical sciences, clinical psychology, business, and bioethics. It is accredited by the Higher Learning Commission and recognized by the Coordinating Board of Higher Education for the Missouri Department of Higher Education. The College of Osteopathic Medicine is accredited by the American Osteopathic Association's Commission on Osteopathic College Accreditation.

=== College of Osteopathic Medicine ===
Founded in 1916 as the university's inaugural program, the College of Osteopathic Medicine confers the Doctor of Osteopathic Medicine (DO) degree.

The College of Osteopathic Medicine is one of three medical schools in the United States to be recognized twice with the John Templeton Foundation's Spirituality in Medicine Curricular Award, which recognizes outstanding medical education curricula incorporating spirituality in medicine. KCU is also one of three osteopathic medical schools nationwide working to enhance future physicians’ cultural competency and eliminate disparities in health care through a grant from the American Medical Student Association.

The curriculum at KCU's College of Osteopathic Medicine consists of four years of structured training. Training includes didactic learning and standardized patient encounters. The first two years are organized in a modified systems, clinical application-based curriculum. Each system is repeated in years one and two. The first year focuses on normal structure and function, while the second year focuses on disease processes and clinical presentation. Throughout years one and two, students have early clinical exposure in the curriculum through participation in Score 1 for Health (which provides in-school screenings for elementary school children in need), standardized patient encounters, and human patient simulation. During years three and four, students are matched with a preceptor or at a hospital/ward at a KCU-affiliated clerkship site in various specialties of medicine and surgery.

Students at KCU's College of Osteopathic Medicine also partner with local health organizations during the first and second year. First and second year students can apply to be student doctors and scribes, working with attending physicians, at KC Care Health Center, a local clinic providing health services to financially underserved populations in Kansas City, MO.

The College of Osteopathic Medicine offers concurrent-degree programs including a DO/Master of Arts in Bioethics and a DO/MBA in Health Care Leadership, which is offered through a partnership with Rockhurst University’s Helzberg School of Management. Concurrent-degree students complete both programs in four years and graduate with other members of their KCU class.

=== College of Biosciences ===
The College of Biosciences was established in 2005 and currently offers two Master of Science programs in Biomedical Sciences: a one-year intensive track for the Master of Science in Biomedical Sciences and a two-year research track for a Master of Science in Biomedical Science Research.

=== Clinical Psychology Doctoral Program ===
KCU's Clinical Psychology Doctoral (PsyD) Program is a five-year, practice-oriented program. Students are exposed to a broad base of discipline-specific knowledge and trained in profession-wide competencies set by the American Psychological Association. KCU offers the only PsyD program in Missouri or Kansas.

=== College of Dental Medicine ===
The College of Dental Medicine on the KCU-Joplin campus had its first D1 class in June 2023.

== Campuses ==
=== KCU-Kansas City Campus ===
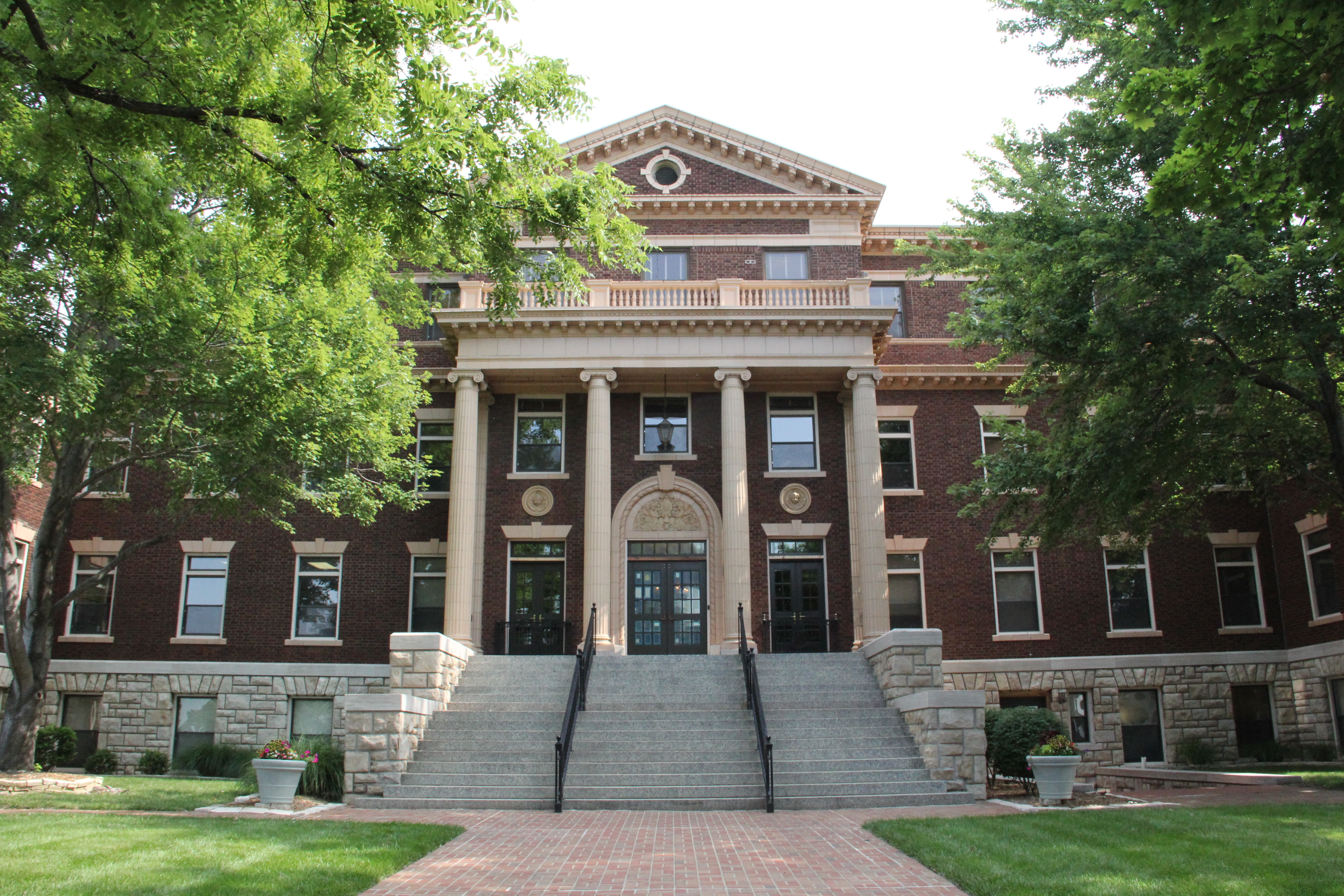
Kansas City University (KCU) Administration Building

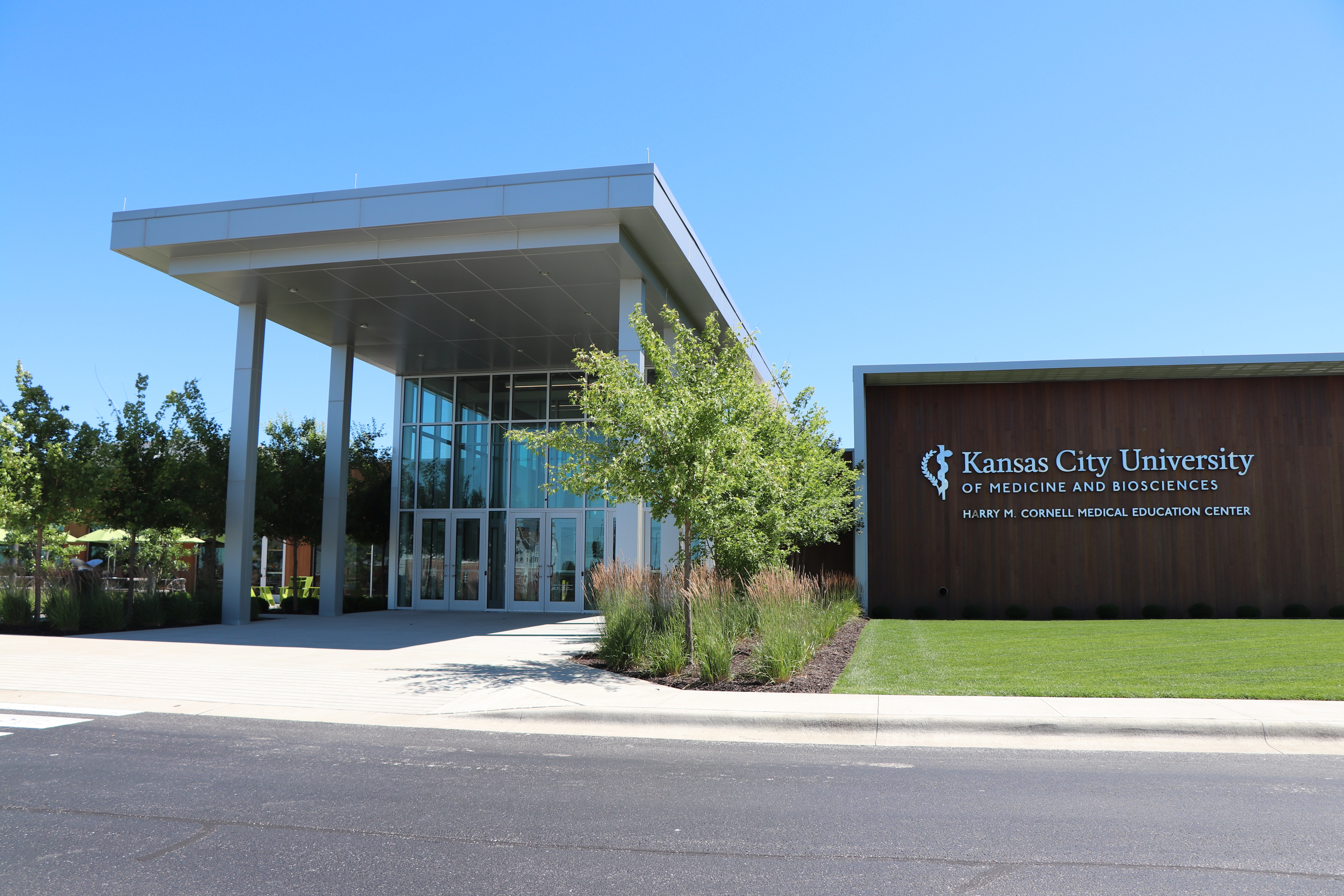
Kansas City University (KCU) Joplin Farber-McIntire Campus

The KCU-Kansas City campus has 13 buildings on 23 acres (9.3 ha).

The Administration Building, the prior site of Children's Mercy Hospital, houses the administrative offices and support facilities.

The Annex Building consists primarily of classroom space. The D'Angelo Library opened in the spring of 2011 and includes a learning resources center, collection and reference rooms, several training and conference rooms, an audio-visual/multimedia room, a special collections room, and group study rooms and numerous offices for library support personnel. The library was named for Vincent D'Angelo, D.O. (class of 1957) and his wife, Cleo D'Angelo. The Leonard Smith Hall houses more than 50 individual and small-group study rooms, a computer lab, student lounge, and a Bioethics classroom. The Mary Lou Butterworth, D.O., Alumni Center is a meeting center for students, faculty, and alumni.

The Dybedal Center for Research is the focus of research activities at KCU. The 45,000-square-foot (4,200 m^{2}) center is equipped for Biosafety Levels I and II research, and basic science laboratories. Opened in 2004, the Dybedal Center includes a clinical research center, the only adult academic clinical research center in Kansas City that conducts Phase I-IV studies.

The Center for Medical Education Innovation (CMEI) is a 56,000 square feet (5,200 m^{2}) building that opened in 2020, providing medical students simulated clinical experiences using virtual reality and augmented reality technologies. CMEI also houses ICU simulation sites, medical robots, 22 standardized patient rooms, and a 70-bay lab for physical diagnosis, and osteopathic manipulative medicine (OMM).

=== Joplin Farber-McIntire Campus (KCU-Joplin) ===
KCU began classes at the KCU-Joplin campus, in Joplin, Missouri, in 2017. A College of Dental Medicine opened in June 2023. The campus features a 150,000 square feet (14,000 m^{2}) building on approximately 40 acres (16 ha) of land.

== Score 1 for Health ==
Score 1 for Health is a non-profit organization that administers free, comprehensive health screenings to elementary-aged children living in Kansas City's urban core and the Joplin community. The program gives students hands-on clinical training during their first and second year of medical school. The program screens up to 13,000 children for vision, dental, hearing, blood pressure, height, weight and more every year. Registered nurses follow up with children who have a referral and their families to connect them to health resources in the community.

== Notable alumni ==
Since 1916, KCU produced more than 10,500 graduates. Of KCU osteopathic physician alumni, about 70 percent practice primary care medicine, and 40 percent practice in rural settings.

- Phog Allen – professional basketball and baseball player and coach of American football, basketball, and baseball
- Leonard Calabrese – 1975 graduate who is an immunologist at Cleveland Clinic and one of the early pioneers of HIV research
- Earle Haas – 1918 graduate who invented the tampon with an applicator, marketed as "Tampax"
- Karen J. Nichols – 1981 graduate who was the first female president of the AOA and also former chair of the board of directors of the Accreditation Council for Graduate Medical Education
- Joel Weisman – 1970 graduate who was one of the first to identify AIDS
