= WVE =

WVE may refer to:

- Ventschow station (DS100 code: WVE), a railway station in Ventschow, Mecklenburg-Vorpommern, Germany
- Women's Voices for the Earth, a feminist, women-led, North American environmental organization
