= Leonard Calabrese =

- Education: Kansas City University of Medicine and Biosciences
- Occupation: Rheumatologist

Leonard Calabrese is an American rheumatologist, an osteopathic physician, and an internationally recognized HIV/AIDS and hepatitis C researcher at the Cleveland Clinic. Calabrese is the vice chair of the Cleveland Clinic's Department of Rheumatic and Immunologic Diseases and the co-director of the Center for Vasculitis Care and Research, while also serving as director of the Cleveland Clinic's RJ Fasenmyer Center for Clinical Immunology. He is also a medical professor at the Cleveland Clinic Lerner College of Medicine. Over the course of his academic research career, Calabrese has authored more than 300 publications including book chapters and peer-reviewed journal articles.

== Education ==
Calabrese attended Cathedral Preparatory School in Erie, Pennsylvania then went on to complete his undergraduate education at John Carroll University in 1971. He subsequently went on to complete his medical education at the Kansas City University of Medicine and Biosciences' College of Osteopathic Medicine. He graduated with his Doctor of Osteopathic Medicine degree in 1975. After finishing medical school, he completed his internal medicine residency and rheumatology fellowship at the Cleveland Clinic.
