= Tampon =

Menstrual hygiene product to absorb menstrual flow by insertion into the vagina

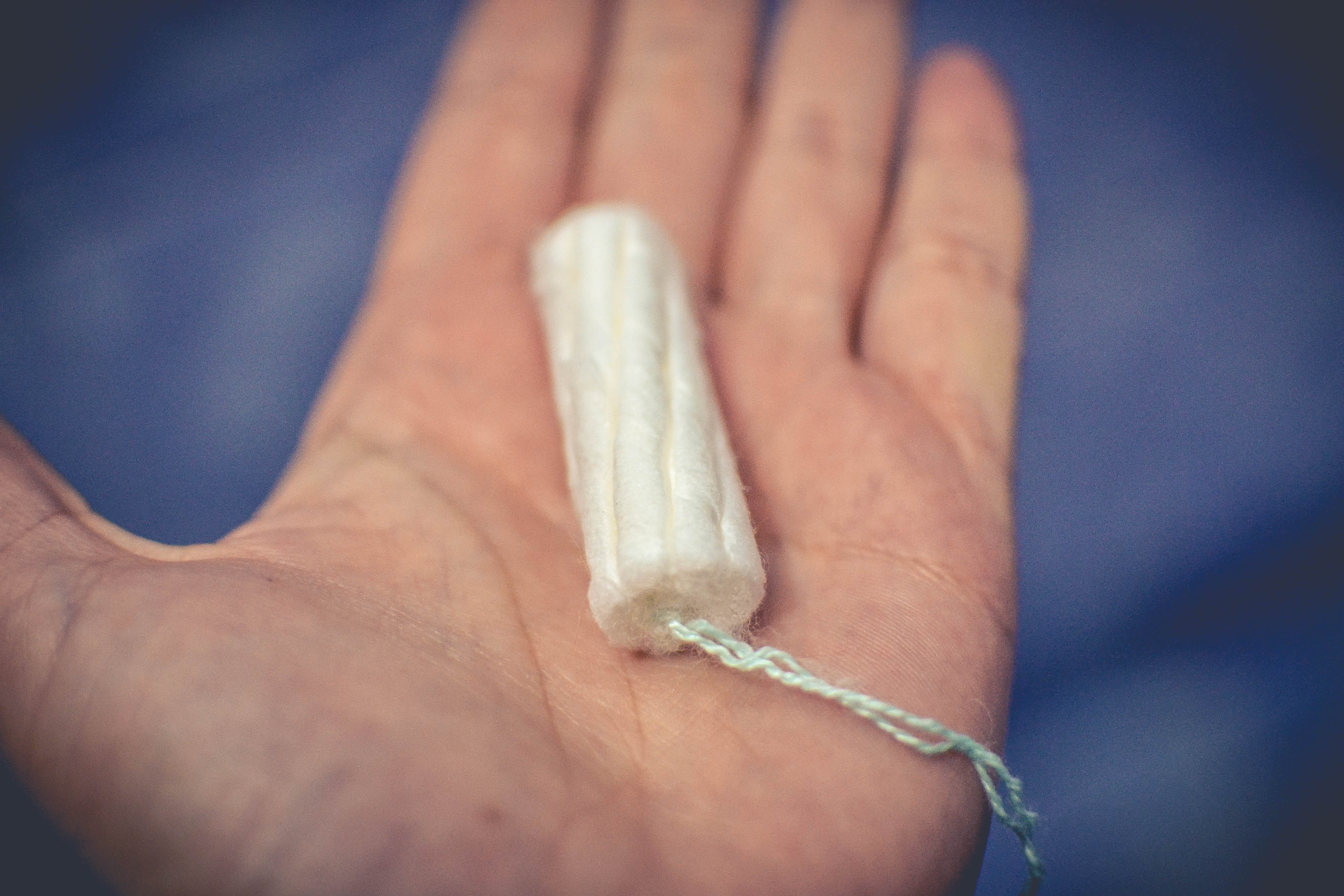
A tampon in its dry, unused state

A tampon is a menstrual product designed to absorb blood and vaginal secretions by insertion into the vagina during menstruation. Unlike a pad, it is placed internally, inside of the vaginal canal. Once inserted correctly, a tampon is held in place by the vagina and expands as it soaks up menstrual blood.

As tampons also absorb the vagina's natural lubrication and bacteria in addition to menstrual blood, they can increase the risk of toxic shock syndrome by changing the normal pH of the vagina and increasing the risk of infections from the bacterium Staphylococcus aureus. TSS is a rare but life-threatening infection that requires immediate medical attention.

The majority of tampons sold are made of blends of rayon and cotton, along with synthetic fibers. Some tampons are made out of organic cotton. Tampons are available in several absorbency ratings.

Several countries regulate tampons as medical devices. In the United States, they are considered to be a Class II medical device by the Food and Drug Administration (FDA). They are sometimes used for hemostasis in surgery.

A tampon (magenta) inserted into the vagina (blue) to collect blood from the uterus (green)

== Design and packaging ==
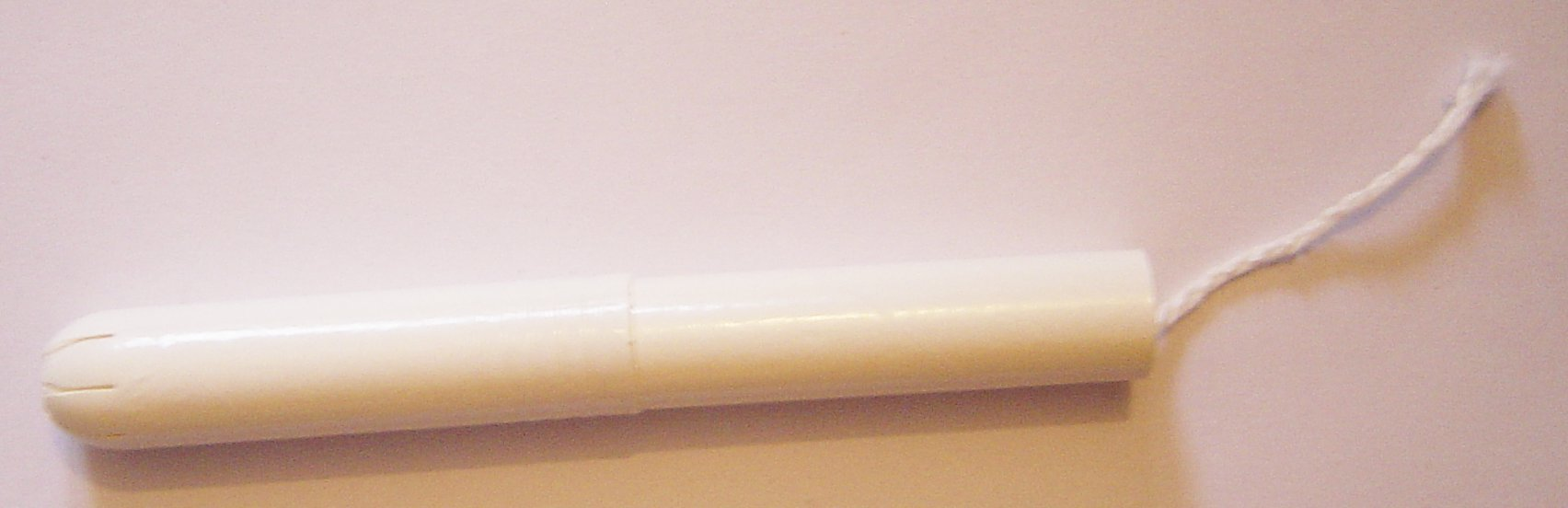
A tampon with applicator

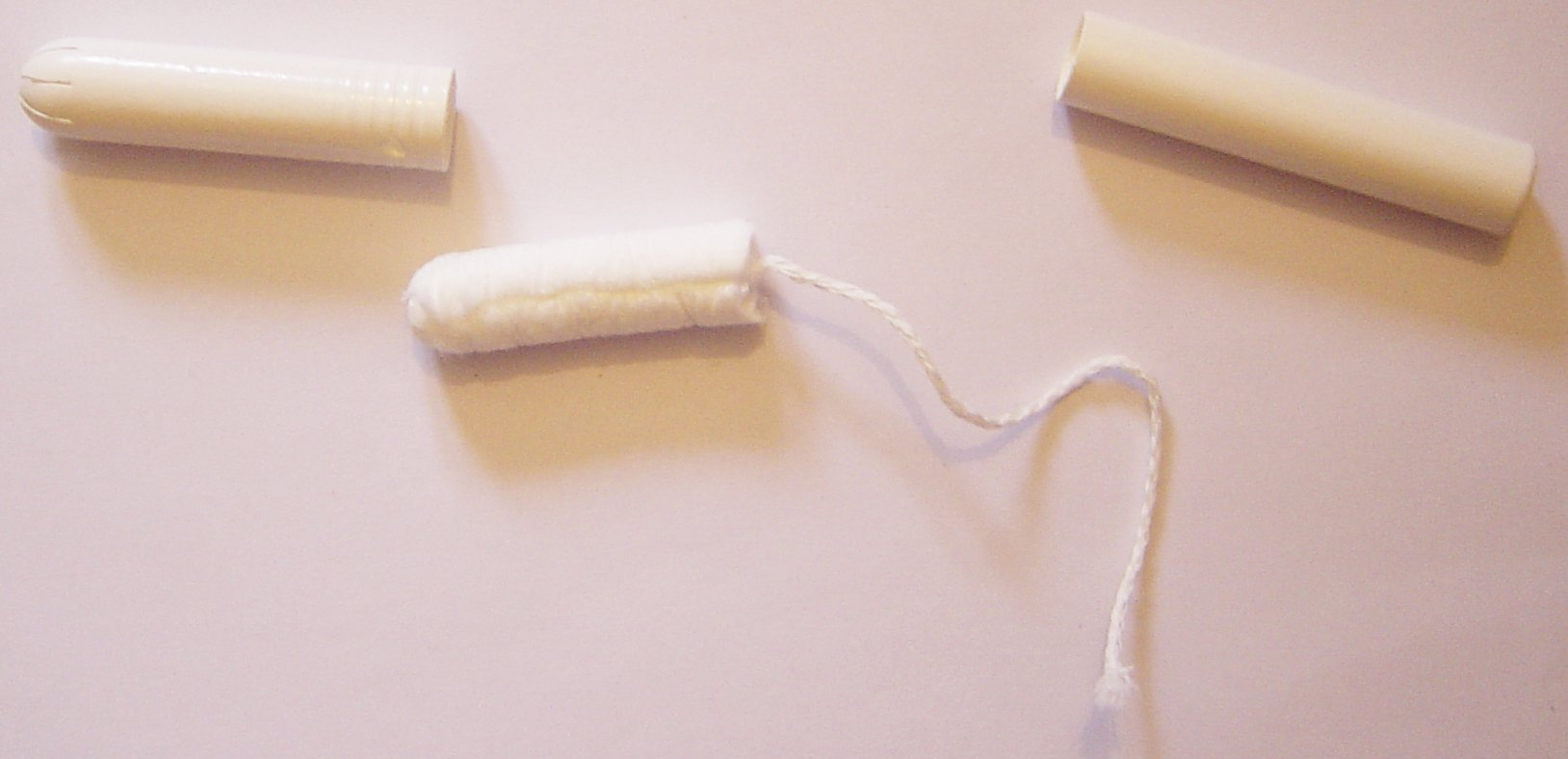
The elements of a tampon with applicator. Left: the bigger tube ("penetrator"). Center: cotton tampon with attached string. Right: the narrower tube.

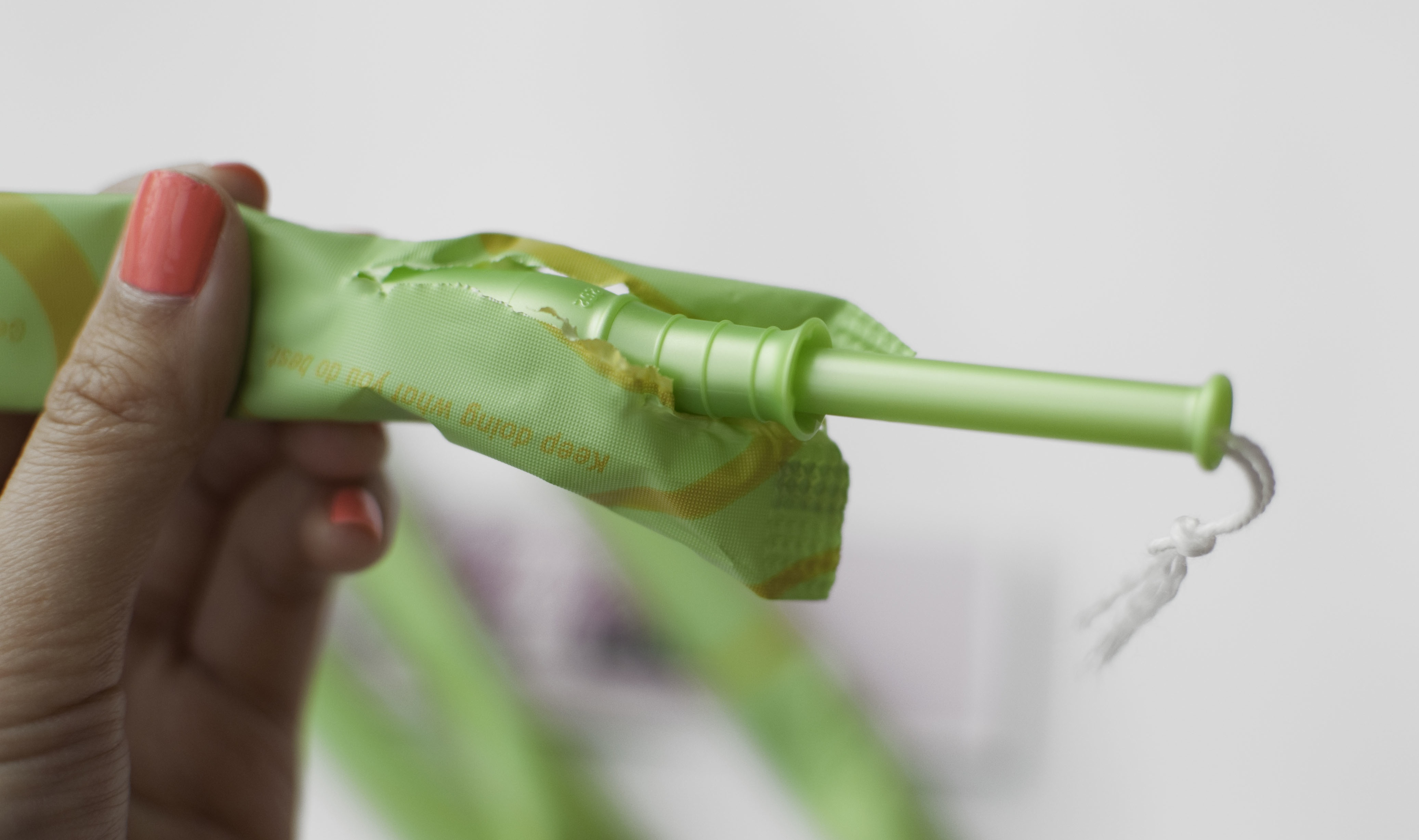
Applicator tampon

Tampon design varies between companies and across product lines in order to offer a variety of applicators, materials and absorbencies. There are two main categories of tampons based on the way of insertion – digital tampons inserted by finger, and applicator tampons. Tampon applicators may be made of plastic or cardboard, and are similar in design to a syringe. The applicator consists of two tubes, an "outer", or barrel, and "inner", or plunger. The outer tube has a smooth surface to aid insertion and sometimes comes with a rounded end that is petaled.

Differences exist in the way tampons expand when in use: applicator tampons generally expand axially (increase in length), while digital tampons will expand radially (increase in diameter). Most tampons have a cord or string for removal. The majority of tampons sold are made of rayon, or a blend of rayon and cotton. Organic cotton tampons are marketed as 100% cotton, but they may have plastic covering the cotton core. Tampons may also come in scented or unscented varieties.

=== Absorbency ratings ===
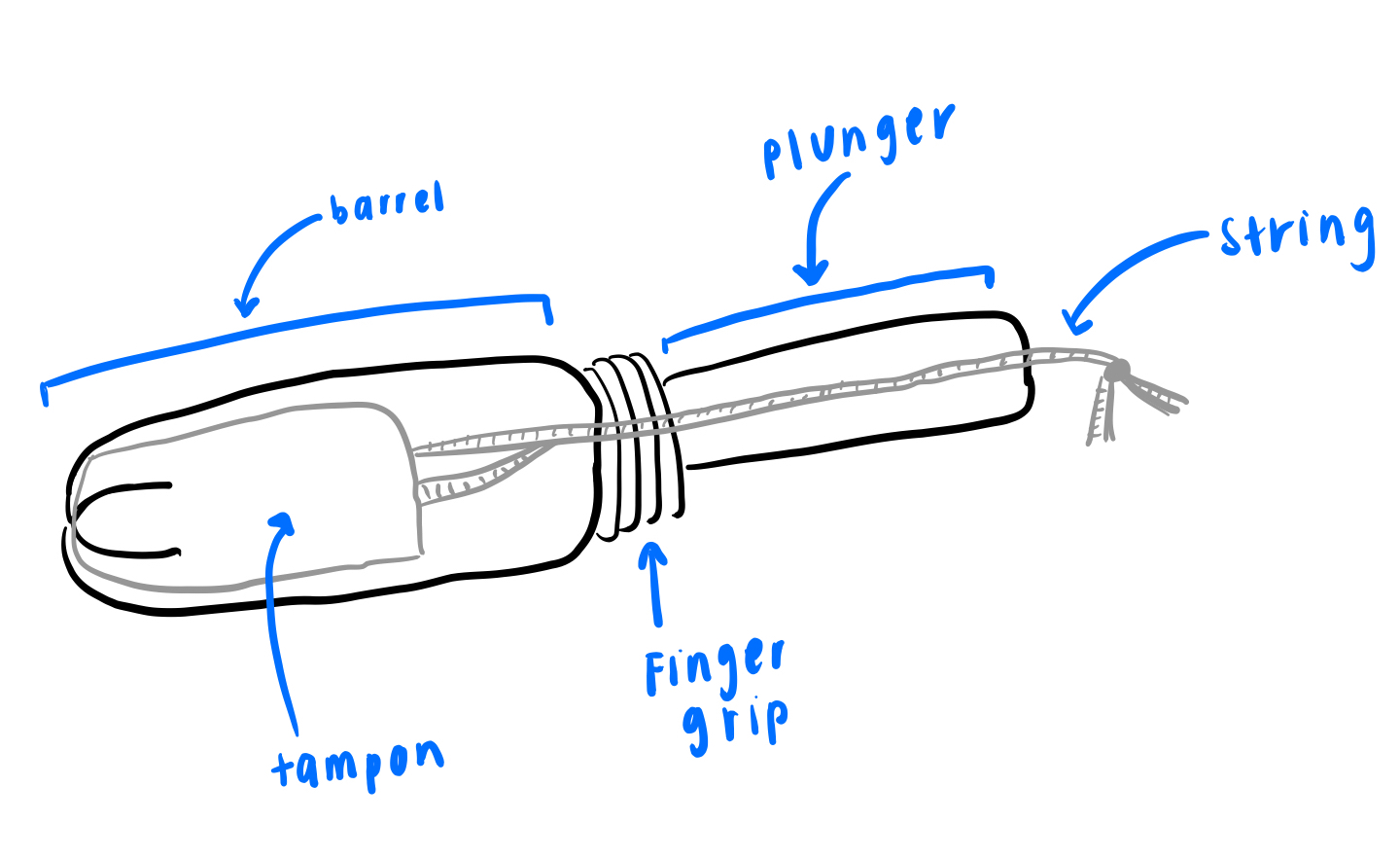
The main elements of a tampon depicted, labeling the tampon, plunger, barrel, finger grip, and string

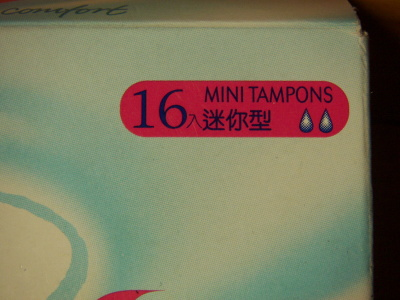
Two water drop marks mean that the absorbency is between 6 and 9 g.

==== In the US ====
Tampons are available in several absorbency ratings, which are consistent across manufacturers in the U.S. These differ in the amount of cotton in each product and are measured based on the amount of fluid they are able to absorb. The absorbency rates required by the U.S. Food and Drug Administration (FDA) for manufacturer labeling are listed below:

FDA absorbency ratings
Ranges of absorbency in grams	Corresponding term of absorbency
6 and under	Light absorbency
6 to 9	Regular absorbency
9 to 12	Super absorbency
12 to 15	Super plus absorbency
15 to 18	Ultra absorbency
Above 18	No term

==== In Europe ====
Absorbency ratings outside the US may be different. The majority of non-US manufacturers use absorbency rating and Code of Practice recommended by EDANA (European Disposables and Nonwovens Association).

European absorbency ratings
Droplets	Grams	Alternative size description
1 droplet	< 6	
2 droplets	6–9	Mini
3 droplets	9–12	Regular
4 droplets	12–15	Super
5 droplets	15–18	
6 droplets	18–21	

==== In the UK ====
In the UK, the Absorbent Hygiene Product Manufacturers Association (AHPMA) has written a Tampon Code of Practice which companies can follow on a volunteer basis. According to this code, UK manufacturers should follow the (European) EDANA code (see above).

=== Testing ===
A piece of test equipment referred to as a Syngyna (short for synthetic vagina) is usually used to test absorbency. The machine uses a condom into which the tampon is inserted, and synthetic menstrual fluid is fed into the test chamber.

A novel way of testing was developed by feminist medical experts after the toxic shock syndrome (TSS) crisis, and used blood – rather than the industry standard blue saline – as a test material.

=== Labeling ===
The FDA requires the manufacturer to perform absorbency testing to determine the absorbency rating using the Syngyna method or other methods that are approved by the FDA. The manufacturer is also required to include on the package label the absorbency rating and a comparison to other absorbency ratings as an attempt to help consumers choose the right product and avoid complications of TSS. In addition, The following statement of association between tampons and TSS is required by the FDA to be on the package label as part of the labeling requirements: "Attention: Tampons are associated with Toxic Shock Syndrome (TSS). TSS is a rare but serious disease that may cause death. Read and save the enclosed information."

Such guidelines for package labeling are more lenient when it comes to tampons bought from vending machines. For example, tampons sold in vending machines are not required by the FDA to include labeling such as absorbency ratings or information about TSS.

=== Costs ===
The average person who menstruates and uses only tampons uses about 11,400 tampons in their lifetime. In the 2020s, tampon prices have risen due to inflation and supply chain challenges. As of 2022, a box of tampons typically cost between $7 and US$12 and contains 16 to 40 tampons, depending on the brand and size. This means users might spend between $63 and $108 annually on tampons alone, assuming the need for around 9 boxes per year. This corresponds to an average cost of approximately $0.22–$0.75 per tampon, reflecting price increases of up to 33% since the pandemic. Activists call the problem some women have when not being able to afford menstrual products "period poverty". The fact that, in certain U.S. states, sales tax applies to menstrual products is referred to as a "tampon tax". As of 2024, 23 states exempt these products, while others impose taxes up to 7%. Local taxes can also apply, adding further costs. Some states such as Texas recently abolished this tax. Some states provide free tampons and pads in public schools and prisons, helping to alleviate period poverty.

== Health aspects ==
=== Menstrual toxic shock syndrome ===
Menstrual toxic shock syndrome (mTSS) is a life-threatening disease most commonly caused by infection of superantigen-producing Staphylococcus aureus. The superantigen toxin secreted in S. aureus infections is TSS Toxin-1, or TSST-1. Incidence ranges from 0.03 to 0.50 cases per 100,000 people, with an overall mortality around 8%. mTSS signs and symptoms include fever (greater than or equal to 38.9 °C), rash, desquamation, hypotension (systolic blood pressure less than 90 mmHg), and multi-system organ involvement with at least three systems, such as gastrointestinal complications (vomiting), central nervous system (CNS) effects (disorientation), and myalgia.

Toxic shock syndrome was named by James K. Todd in 1978. Philip M. Tierno Jr., Director of Clinical Microbiology and Immunology at the NYU Langone Medical Center, helped determine that tampons were behind toxic shock syndrome (TSS) cases in the early 1980s. Tierno blames the introduction of higher-absorbency tampons made with rayon in 1978, as well as the relatively recent decision by manufacturers to recommend that tampons can be worn overnight, for the surge in cases of TSS. However, a later meta-analysis found that the material composition of tampons is not directly correlated to the incidence of toxic shock syndrome, whereas oxygen and carbon dioxide content of menstrual fluid uptake is associated more strongly.

In 1982, a liability case called Kehm v. Procter & Gamble took place, where the family of Patricia Kehm sued Procter & Gamble for her death on September 6, 1982, from TSS, while using Rely brand tampons. The case was the first successful case to sue the company. Procter & Gamble paid $300,000 in compensatory damages to the Kehm family. This case can be attributed to the increase in regulations and safety protocol testing for current FDA requirements.

Some risk factors identified for developing TSS include recent labor and delivery, tampon use, recent staphylococcus infection, recent surgery, and foreign objects inside the body.

The FDA suggests the following guidelines for decreasing the risk of contracting TSS when using tampons:

- Choose the lowest absorbency needed for one's flow (test of absorbency is approved by FDA)
- Follow package directions and guidelines for insertion and tampon usage (located on box's label)
- Change the tampon at least every 4 to 8 hours
- Alternate usage between tampons and pads
- Increase awareness of the warning signs of Toxic Shock Syndrome and other tampon-associated health risks (and remove the tampon as soon as a risk factor is noticed)

The FDA also advises those with a history of TSS not to use tampons and instead turn to other feminine hygiene products to control menstrual flow. Other menstrual hygiene products available include pads, menstrual cups, menstrual discs, and reusable period underwear.

Cases of tampon-connected TSS are very rare in the United Kingdom and United States. A controversial study by Tierno found that all-cotton tampons were less likely than rayon tampons to produce the conditions in which TSS can grow. This was done using a direct comparison of 20 brands of tampons, including conventional cotton/rayon tampons and 100% organic cotton tampons. In a series of studies conducted after this initial claim, it was shown that all tampons (regardless of composition) are similar in their effect on TSS and that tampons made with rayon do not have an increased incidence of TSS. Instead, tampons should be selected based on minimum absorbency rating necessary to absorb flow corresponding to the individual.

Sea sponges are also marketed as menstrual hygiene products. A 1980 study by the University of Iowa found that commercially sold sea sponges contained harmful materials like sand and bacteria.

Studies have shown non-significantly higher mean levels of mercury in tampon users compared to non tampon users. No evidence showed an association between tampon use and inflammation biomarkers.

=== Other considerations ===
==== Bleached products ====
According to the Women's Environmental Network research briefing on menstrual products made from wood pulp:

The basic ingredient for menstrual pads is wood pulp, which begins life as a brown coloured product. Various 'purification' processes can be used to bleach it white. Measurable levels of dioxin have been found near paper pulping mills, where chlorine has been used to bleach the wood pulp. Dioxin is one of the most persistent and toxic chemicals, and can cause reproductive disorders, damage to the immune system and cancer (26). There are no safe levels and it builds up in our fat tissue and in our environment.

==== Marine pollution ====
In the UK, the Marine Conservation Society has researched the prevalence and problem of plastic tampon applicators found on beaches.

==== Disposal and flushing ====
Disposal of tampons, especially flushing (which manufacturers warn against) may lead to clogged drains and waste management problems.

==== Tampon-drug interactions ====
There are multiple cases in which the use of tampons may need medical advice from a healthcare professional. For example, as part of the National Institutes of Health, the U.S. National Library of Medicine and its branch MedlinePlus advise against using tampons while being treated with any of several medications taken by the vaginal route such as vaginal suppositories and creams, as tampons may decrease the absorbance of these drugs by the body. Example of these medications include clindamycin, terconazole, miconazole, clotrimazole, when used as a vaginal cream or vaginal suppository, as well as butoconazole vaginal cream.

==== Increased risk for infections ====
According to the American Society for Blood and Marrow Transplantation (ASBMT), tampons may be responsible for an increased risk of infection due to the erosions it causes in the tissue of the cervix and vagina, leaving the skin prone to infections. Thus, ASBMT advises hematopoietic stem cell transplantation recipients against using tampons while undergoing therapy.

== Other uses ==
=== Clinical use ===
Tampons are currently being used and tested to restore and/or maintain the normal microbiota of the vagina to treat bacterial vaginosis. Some of these are available to the public but come with disclaimers. The efficacy of the use of these probiotic tampons has not been established.

Tampons have also been used in cases of tooth extraction to reduce post-extraction bleeding.

Tampons are currently being investigated as a possible use to detect endometrial cancer. Endometrial cancer does not currently have effective cancer screening methods if an individual is not showing symptoms. Tampons not only absorb menstrual blood, but also vaginal fluids. The vaginal fluids absorbed in the tampons would also contain the cancerous DNA, and possibly contain precancerous material, allowing for earlier detection of endometrial cancer. Clinical trials are currently being conducted to evaluate the use of tampons as a screening method for early detection of endometrial cancer.

== Environment and waste ==
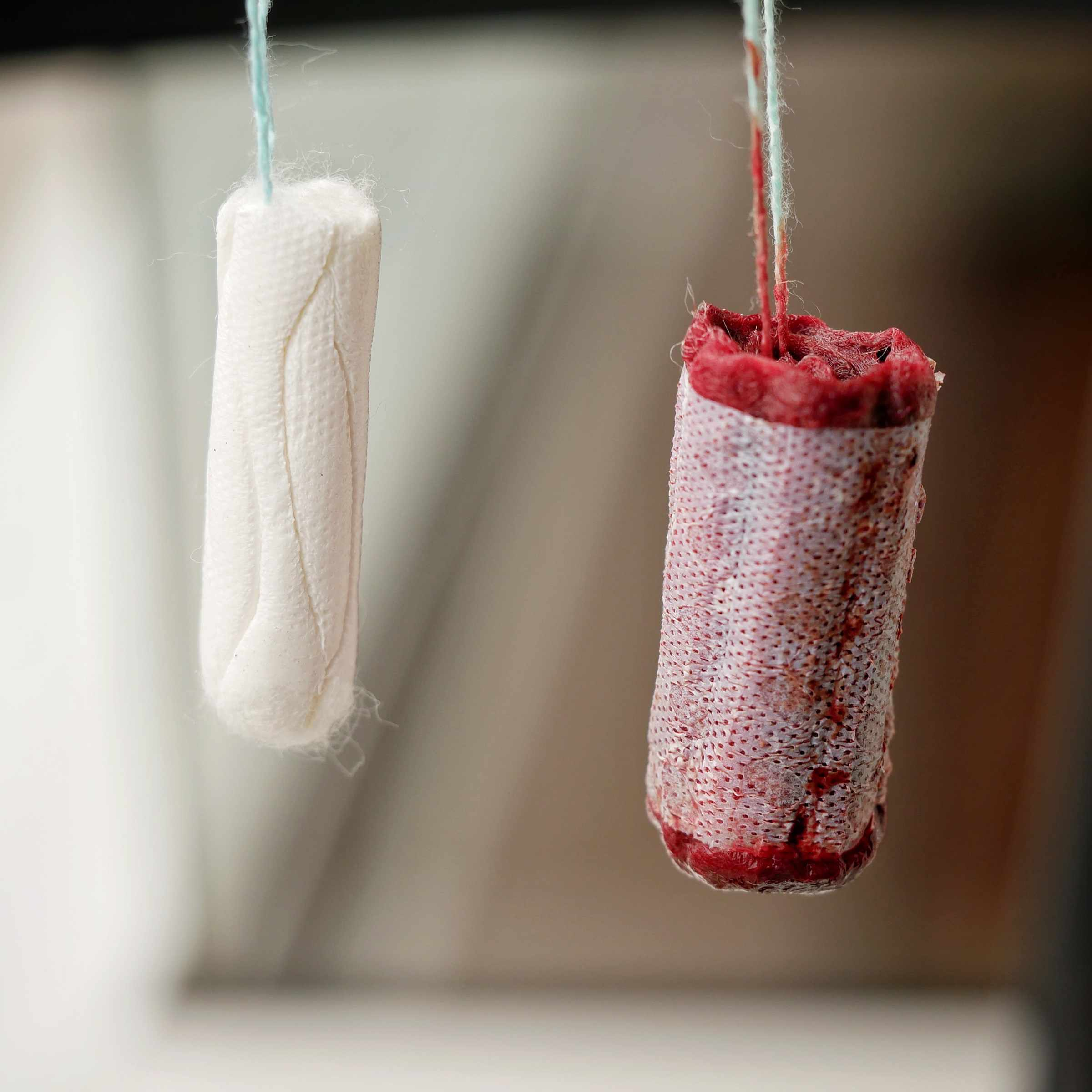
Unused (left) and used (right) tampon

Appropriate disposal of used tampons is still lacking in many countries. Because of the lack of menstrual management practices in some countries, many sanitary pads or other menstrual products will be disposed into domestic solid wastes or garbage bins that eventually becomes part of a solid wastes.

The issue that underlies the governance or implementation of menstrual waste management is how country categorizes menstrual waste. This waste could be considered as a common household waste, hazardous household waste (which will required to be segregated from routine household waste), biomedical waste given amount of blood it contains, or plastic waste given the plastic content in many commercial disposal pads (some only the outer case of the tampon or pads).

Ecological impact varies according to disposal method (whether a tampon is flushed down the toilet or placed in a garbage bin – the latter is the recommended option). Factors such as tampon composition will likewise impact sewage treatment plants or waste processing. The average use of tampons in menstruation may add up to approximately 11,400 tampons in someone's lifetime (if they use only tampons rather than other products). Tampons are made of cotton, rayon, polyester, polyethylene, polypropylene, and fiber finishes. Aside from the cotton, rayon and fiber finishes, these materials are not biodegradable. Organic cotton tampons are biodegradable, but must be composted to ensure they break down in a reasonable amount of time. Rayon was found to be more biodegradable than cotton.

Environmentally friendly alternatives to using tampons are the menstrual cup, reusable sanitary pads, menstrual sponges, reusable tampons, and reusable absorbent underwear.

The Royal Institute of Technology in Stockholm carried out a life-cycle assessment (LCA) comparison of the environmental impact of tampons and sanitary pads. They found that the main environmental impact of the products was in fact caused by the processing of raw materials, particularly LDPE (low density polyethylene) – or the plastics used in the backing of pads and tampon applicators, and cellulose production. As production of these plastics requires a lot of energy and creates long-lasting waste, the main impact from the life cycle of these products is fossil fuel use, though the waste produced is significant in its own right.

The menstrual material was disposed according to the type of product, and even based on cultural beliefs. This was done regardless of giving any importance to the location and proper techniques of disposal. In some areas of the world, menstrual waste is disposed into pit latrines, as burning and burial were difficult due to limited private space.

== History ==
Women have used tampons during menstruation for thousands of years. In her book Everything You Must Know About Tampons (1981), Nancy Friedman writes,

[T]here is evidence of tampon use throughout history in a multitude of cultures. The oldest printed medical document, Ebers Papyrus, refers to the use of soft papyrus tampons by Egyptian women in the fifteenth century B.C. Roman women used wool tampons. Women in ancient Japan fashioned tampons out of paper, held them in place with a bandage, and changed them 10 to 12 times a day. Traditional Hawaiian women used the furry part of a native fern called hapu'u; and grasses, mosses and other plants are still used by women in parts of Asia and Africa.

R. G. Mayne defined a tampon in 1860 as: "a less inelegant term for the plug, whether made up of portions of rag, sponge, or a silk handkerchief, where plugging the vagina is had recourse to in cases of hemorrhage."

Earle Haas patented the first modern tampon, Tampax, with the tube-within-a-tube applicator. Gertrude Schulte Tenderich (née Voss) bought the patent rights to her company trademark Tampax and started as a seller, manufacturer, and spokesperson in 1933. Tenderich hired women to manufacture the item and then hired two sales associates to market the product to drugstores in Colorado and Wyoming, and nurses to give public lectures on the benefits of the creation, and was also instrumental in inducing newspapers to run advertisements.

In 1945, Tampax presented a number of studies to prove the safety of tampons. A 1965 study by the Rock Reproductive Clinic stated that the use of tampons "has no physiological or clinical undesired side effects".

During her study of female anatomy, German gynecologist Judith Esser-Mittag developed a digital-style tampon, which was made to be inserted without an applicator. In the late 1940s, Carl Hahn and Heinz Mittag worked on the mass production of this tampon. Hahn sold his company to Johnson & Johnson in 1974.

In 1992, the United States Congress found an internal FDA memo about the presence of dioxin, a known carcinogen, in tampons. Dioxin is one of the toxic chemicals produced when wood pulp is bleached with chlorine. Congressional hearings were held and tampon manufacturers assured Congress that the trace levels of dioxin in tampons was well below EPA level. The EPA has stated there is no acceptable level of dioxin. Following this, major commercial tampon brands began switching from dioxin-producing chlorine gas bleaching methods to either elemental "chlorine-free" or "totally chlorine free" bleaching processes.

In the United States, the Tampon Safety and Research Act was introduced to Congress in 1997 in an attempt to create transparency between tampon manufacturers and consumers. The bill would mandate the conduct or support of research on the extent to which additives in feminine hygiene products pose any risks to the health of women or to the children of women who use those products during or before the pregnancies involved. Although yet to be passed, the bill has been continually reintroduced, most recently in 2019 as the Robin Danielson Feminine Hygiene Product Safety Act. Data would also be required from manufacturers regarding the presence of dioxins, synthetic fibers, chlorine, and other components (including contaminants and substances used as fragrances, colorants, dyes, and preservatives) in their feminine hygiene products.

== Society and culture ==
=== Tampon tax ===
"Tampon tax" refers to tampons' lack of tax exempt status that is often in place for other basic need products. Several political statements have been made in regards to tampon use. In 2000, a 10% goods and services tax (GST) was introduced in Australia. While lubricant, condoms, incontinence pads and numerous medical items were regarded as essential and exempt from the tax, tampons continue to be charged GST. Prior to the introduction of GST, several states also applied a luxury tax to tampons at a higher rate than GST. Specific petitions such as "Axe the Tampon Tax" have been created to oppose this tax, and the tax was removed in 2019. In the UK, tampons are subject to a zero rate of value added tax (VAT), as opposed to the standard rate of 20% applied to the vast majority of products sold in the country. The UK was previously bound by the EU VAT directive, which required a minimum of 5% VAT on sanitary products. Since 1 January 2021, VAT applied to menstrual sanitary products has been 0%.

In Canada, the federal government has removed the goods and services tax (GST) and harmonized sales tax (HST) from tampons and other menstrual hygiene products as of 1 July 2015.

In the US, access to menstrual products such as pads and tampons and taxes added on these products, have also been controversial topics especially when it comes to people with low income. Laws for exempting such taxes differ vastly from state to state. The American Civil Liberties Union (ACLU) has published a report discussing these laws and listing the different guidelines followed by institutions such as schools, shelters, and prisons when providing menstrual goods.

The report by ACLU also discusses the case of Kimberly Haven who was a former prisoner that had a hysterectomy after she had experienced toxic shock syndrome (TSS) due to using handmade tampons from toilet paper in prison. Her testimony supported a Maryland bill that is intended to increase access of menstrual products for imprisoned women.

=== Etymology ===
Historically, the word "tampon" originated from the medieval French word "tampion", meaning a piece of cloth to stop a hole, a stamp, plug, or stopper.

=== Virginity ===
There is a misconception described as sexist that using a tampon rids a person of their virginity. This is because some cultures regard virginity as indicated by whether the hymen is still intact, and may believe that inserting a tampon breaks the hymen. However, this belief is not rooted in medical science. The hymen, a thin membrane partially covering the vaginal opening, varies greatly in thickness, elasticity, and shape from person to person. It almost never blocks the entire vaginal opening, stretches and thins naturally over time, and can stretch or break due to non-sexual everyday activities such as exercise; conversely, it may not break even after penetrative sexual intercourse, as it is able to stretch. Therefore, the presence or condition of the hymen is not an indicator of virginity.

Medical professionals have pointed out that misconceptions about the hymen lead to medically unfounded and harmful practices such as virginity testing and hymenoplasty.

=== In popular culture ===
In Stephen King's novel Carrie, the title character is bullied for menstruating and is bombarded with tampons and pads by her peers.

In 1985, Tampon Applicator Creative Klubs International (TACKI) was established to develop creative uses for discarded, non-biodegradable, plastic feminine hygiene products, commonly referred to as "beach whistles". TACKI President Jay Critchley launched his corporation in order to develop a global folk art movement and cottage industry, promote awareness of these throwaway objects washed up on beaches worldwide from faulty sewage systems, create the world's largest collection of discarded plastic tampon applicators, and ban their manufacture and sale through legislative action. The project and artwork was carried out during numerous site-specific performances and installations.

=== Intersectionality ===
==== Gender inclusion ====
Tampons are traditionally marketed as products for women, conserving the idea that menstruation only affects cisgender women, or women who were assigned female at birth and continue to identify with that label. This framing marginalizes transgender men, nonbinary individuals, and genderqueer people who menstruate. This makes their experiences with menstruation largely invisible in public discourse, marketing, and product design. Addressing gender inclusion in the context of tampons involves examining societal stigmas, access challenges, and evolving efforts to create more inclusive spaces for all people who menstruate. In recent years, when discussing periods, academia has shifted terminology to be more inclusive, thus beginning to use the term "menstruators" instead of "women."

Additionally, public restrooms often reinforce a binary understanding of gender. Men's restrooms rarely, if ever, provide menstrual product dispensers, leaving many queer people without access to tampons when needed. When using the women's bathroom in attempt to have access to period products, transgender and nonbinary individuals may face safety concerns or harassment for accessing restrooms that do not align with their gender identity.

Some menstrual product companies, such as Aunt Flow and Thinx, have started using inclusive language like "menstrual products" instead of "feminine hygiene products." These efforts aim to normalize menstruation for all individuals who experience it, regardless of gender. In marketing, efforts to redesign tampon packaging to be more gender-neutral help make these products less alienating for trans and nonbinary users. Removing pink or floral designs, for example, makes them more approachable.

==== Socioeconomic disparities ====
Access to tampons is shaped by significant socioeconomic disparities, with systemic barriers disproportionately affecting individuals from low-income backgrounds. These disparities show up in various ways, including affordability challenges, stigmatization, and inadequate infrastructure. Addressing these issues requires recognizing how economic inequality intersects with social factors to restrict access to menstrual products like tampons.

A large issue in our society is period poverty, which refers to the lack of access to menstrual products, hygiene facilities, and education due to financial constraints. It is a prevalent issue in both developing and developed countries, where many people cannot afford tampons and other menstrual products. In many low-income communities, individuals often miss school, work, or social activities due to a lack of menstrual products. This contributes to cycles of poverty, as menstruation becomes a barrier to education and economic opportunities. Globally, an estimated 500 million people face period poverty. In United States, studies have shown that one in five students have struggled to afford menstrual products.

Many schools, shelters, and prisons fail to provide tampons for free or in sufficient quantities. Low-income students, in particular, may resort to unsafe alternatives like paper towels or rags, which can lead to health risks such as infections. Homeless menstruators face unique challenges, as they often lack both the financial means to purchase tampons and access to clean facilities for changing them. Nonprofits like The Homeless Period Project work to distribute tampons to these populations, but systemic support is still lacking.

==== Racial inequities ====
Racial inequities in access to menstrual products are shaped by a complex interplay of systemic racism, socioeconomic disparities, cultural stigmas, and healthcare inequality. These inequities disproportionately affect menstruators from marginalized backgrounds, limiting their access to essential products.

Menstruators from racialized communities are more likely to live in poverty due to historical economic inequities. This economic disadvantage makes purchasing tampons and other menstrual products a financial burden. This is because in some predominantly Black and Brown communities, menstrual products may be sold at higher prices due to fewer retail options and the "poverty tax," where essential goods cost more in underserved areas.

Cultural stigmas around menstruation can be particularly pronounced in certain racial and ethnic communities, where periods may be considered taboo or inappropriate to discuss openly. This silence can discourage menstruators from seeking tampons or advocating for their needs. In some cultures, tampons are viewed with suspicion. They are linked to myths about virginity or seen as inappropriate for younger menstruators. These beliefs can limit the willingness or ability of individuals in certain racial groups to access tampons.

Additionally, schools in marginalized racial communities often lack comprehensive menstrual education programs. This lack of education can leave menstruators unaware of the variety of menstrual products available, or unsure how to use them safely. On top of that, racial biases in the education system may contribute to a lack of attention to the menstrual health needs of students from different racial groups.

There are many other aspects of racial inequity when it comes to menstrual product education and accessibility. People of color are less likely to have access to adequate gynecological care, and more likely to face discrimination in the health world regardless of their health issue. To add onto that, the diverse needs of people from ethnic backgrounds have historically been neglected by marketing companies. When advertising does attempt to include people of color, it often fails to address the unique cultural stigmas, challenges, or values that shape their experiences with menstruation.

==== Tampons and disability ====
Individuals with conditions that affect fine motor skills or hand strength (e.g., arthritis, cerebral palsy, or multiple sclerosis) may find it difficult to unwrap, insert, or remove tampons. The small size of tampons and their applicators can be a significant barrier. Most tampons are designed with the assumption of able-bodied users, lacking features like ergonomic grips, adaptive applicators, or designs that accommodate reduced hand mobility. Public restrooms, especially those not compliant with accessibility standards, may not provide sufficient space or the necessary support structures (e.g., grab bars) for disabled individuals to manage tampon insertion or removal. People who struggle with vision may encounter difficulties identifying tampon sizes, brands, or instructions due to the lack of braille on packaging or tactile features on the products themselves. For menstruators with hearing impairments, they may miss out on important product usage information if it is only provided through audio formats or poorly captioned content.

People with intellectual or developmental disabilities may require additional support to learn how to use tampons safely and effectively. Complex instructions, such as proper insertion angles and removal timing, can be challenging to navigate without guidance. Caregivers or support workers may need to assist disabled menstruators with tampon usage. However, this raises concerns about autonomy, privacy, and dignity, as menstruation is a deeply personal experience.

Certain disabilities or chronic illnesses (e.g., endometriosis, pelvic floor disorders, or interstitial cystitis) may make tampon use uncomfortable or painful. These conditions can limit access to tampons as a viable option for menstrual care. Some disabled individuals have heightened sensitivity to tampon materials (e.g., rayon, chlorine bleach, or fragrances), which can increase discomfort or lead to allergic reactions.

Disabled menstruators often face compounded stigma, as society tends to marginalize both disabled individuals and discussions around menstruation. This can lead to isolation and discomfort in seeking out appropriate menstrual products.

==== Activism and advocacy ====
Advocacy around tampons intersects with broader movements for menstrual equity. These movements aim to dismantle the societal, economic, and cultural barriers that perpetuate inequality. Activism plays a critical role in shaping policy and ensuring that tampons are accessible and affordable for all menstruators. Many advocacy groups campaign to remove sales tax on tampons and other menstrual products, arguing that these items are essential healthcare products rather than luxury goods. Success stories include states and countries that have already abolished the tax, setting a precedent for global change.

Campaigns also work to normalize conversations about menstruation, dismantling stigma that has historically silenced discussions around menstrual products. Destigmatization efforts include public education campaigns, art installations, and social media movements aimed at reframing menstruation as a natural aspect of human health. Advocates are pushing for the portrayal of menstruation in mainstream media, emphasizing diverse menstruators' experiences and highlighting the role of tampons in empowering individuals to manage their periods effectively.

Organizations like Period: The Menstrual Movement and Menstrual Equity for All are working to raise awareness about the need for inclusivity in menstruation-related discussions. Advocating for free menstrual products in schools, prisons, and public spaces, particularly in areas serving predominantly racialized populations, can help bridge gaps in access. Schools and healthcare providers must offer menstrual care that reflect the cultural challenges faced by diverse racial groups, ensuring that tampons are accessible to all.

== See also ==
- Cloth menstrual pad
- Menstrual cup
- Sanitary napkin
- Tamponade
- Menstruation and culture
