= Marc B. Hahn =

American academic

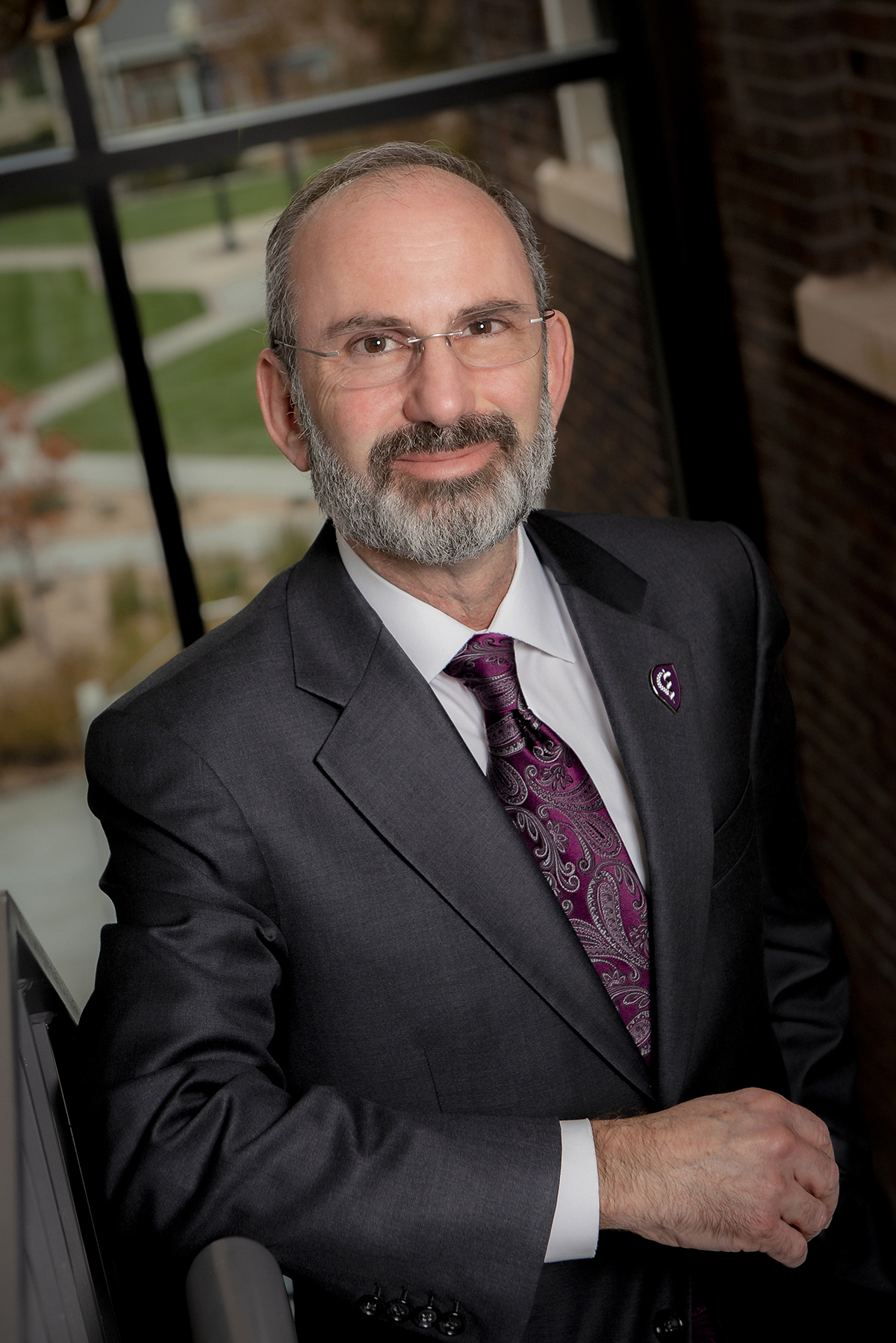
Marc B. Hahn, DO

Marc B. Hahn, DO (born 1958) is the president and chief executive officer of Kansas City University (KCU). Before becoming KCU's president in 2013, Hahn served briefly as the university's Senior Vice President for Health Affairs and Dean of the College of Osteopathic Medicine. Prior to coming to KCU, he held that same role at the University of New England College of Osteopathic Medicine for 3 years, and at the University of North Texas Health Science Center for 8 years. Hahn had been a professor and Pain Medicine Division Chief at the Pennsylvania State University College of Medicine and the Milton S. Hershey Medical Center following several years in private practice. Hahn is also a veteran of the U.S. Army.

== Early life and education ==
Born in Providence, Rhode Island, Hahn graduated from Syracuse University in 1980 with a Bachelor of Science in biology, before earning a Doctor of Osteopathic Medicine (DO) from Des Moines University in 1984. He completed both an internship and residency in anesthesiology at Walter Reed Army Medical Center in Washington, D.C., followed by fellowships in pain management at Georgetown University Hospital and the Clinic Center of the National Institutes of Health. Hahn is board certified in anesthesiology by the American Board of Anesthesiology (ABA) and the American Osteopathic Board of Anesthesiologists. He is also certified in pain management by both the ABA and the American Board of Pain Medicine.

== Military and presidential service ==
Hahn served in the U.S. Army from 1980 to 1992, advancing to the rank of Major (promotable) prior to his honorable discharge. During his military career, Hahn held the position of Chief of Pain Management Services at Walter Reed National Military Medical Center. He also served as an anesthesiologist for Presidents Ronald Reagan and George H.W. Bush.

=== Kansas City University ===
Since assuming the role of President and CEO, Hahn has overseen a period of growth and development for Kansas City University (KCU). Founded in 1916 in Kansas City, Missouri, the university is home to the largest medical school in the Midwest, the fifth-largest in the nation and the 9th most impactful in the U.S. for primary care. In 2017, KCU added a second campus strategically located in Joplin, Missouri. Under Hahn's leadership, KCU addresses the health care needs of underserved populations in both urban and rural communities, and now includes two sites for its college of osteopathic medicine, a growing college of biosciences, which includes a doctoral program in clinical psychology, and a new college of dental medicine.

=== Achievements and recognition ===
In 2022, Hahn was honored with the Lifetime Achievement Award by the Robert Wood Johnson Foundation Health Policy Fellowship program at the National Academy of Medicine, recognizing his contributions to health policy. His leadership appointments have included serving as President of the American Academy of Pain Medicine, chair of the Board of Deans for the American Association of Colleges of Osteopathic Medicine, and co-chair for the Blue-Ribbon Commission for the Advancement of Osteopathic Medical Education. Hahn's textbook, "Regional Anesthesia: An Atlas of Anatomy and Technique," earned acclaim as the Best New Textbook in Clinical Medicine by the Association of American Publishers.
