= American Osteopathic Board of Internal Medicine =

American organization

- Abbreviation: AOBIM
- Formation: 1942
- Type: Professional
- Headquarters: Chicago, IL
- Coordinates: 36.1376°N 96.0048°W
- Chairman: Beckie Michael, D.O.
- Vice Chairman: Ingrid Brown, D.O.
- Secretary-Treasurer: Kevin DeBoer, D.O.
- Website: certification.osteopathic.org/internal-medicine/

The American Osteopathic Board of Internal Medicine (AOBIM) is an organization that provides board certification to qualified Doctors of Osteopathic Medicine (D.O.) who specialize in the prevention, diagnosis, and treatment of disease in adults (internists). The board is one of 18 medical specialty certifying boards of the American Osteopathic Association Bureau of Osteopathic Specialists approved by the American Osteopathic Association (AOA), and was established in 1942. As of December 2011, 3,072 osteopathic internal medical physicians held active certification with the AOBIM.

== Board certification ==
Initial certification is available to osteopathic internal medicine physicians who have completed an AOA-approved residency in internal medicine, two years of practice, completed written and oral exams, and chart review.

Voluntary recertification was first offered in Fall 1994, and mandatory recertification began in March 1997. Before this time, the initial board certification was permanent, and recertification was not required. Since March 1997, if a physician does not recertify every eight years, their board certification status expires.

Osteopathic internal medicine physicians may receive Certification of Special Qualifications in the following areas:

- Allergy/immunology
- Cardiology
- Endocrinology
- Gastroenterology
- Hematology
- Hematology/oncology*
- Infectious disease
- Pulmonary diseases
- Nephrology
- Oncology
- Rheumatology

Osteopathic internal medicine physicians may also receive Certification of Added Qualifications (CAQ) in the following areas:

- Addiction medicine
- Critical care medicine
- Clinical cardiac electrophysiology
- Interventional cardiology
- Geriatric medicine
- Sports medicine
- Undersea and hyperbaric medicine
- Hospice and palliative medicine
- Sleep medicine

The Certification of Added Qualifications must be maintained through the recertification process every 10 years.

To be board-certified in internal medicine, an osteopathic physician must be board-certified in internal medicine. They must also have graduated from an osteopathic medical school, hold an active license to practice, and complete a written examination.

== See also ==
- American Board of Internal Medicine
- American College of Osteopathic Internists
- AOA Bureau of Osteopathic Specialists
