= Internal medicine =

Medical specialty dealing with adult diseases

Internal medicine, also known as general medicine in Commonwealth nations, is a specialty for medical doctors focused on the prevention, diagnosis, and treatment of diseases in adults. Internal refers to the "treatment of diseases of the internal organs".

Practitioners of internal medicine are referred to as internists in North America and physicians in Britain and most Commonwealth nations. Internists possess specialized skills in managing patients with undifferentiated or multi-system disease processes. They provide care to both hospitalized (inpatient) and ambulatory (outpatient) patients, as their patients are frequently seriously ill or require extensive medical tests. Internists often have subspecialty interests in diseases affecting particular organs or organ systems, and often contribute significantly to teaching and research. The certification process and available subspecialties may vary across different countries.

Internists are qualified doctors who have undergone postgraduate training in internal medicine, and should not be confused with "interns", a term commonly used for a doctor who has obtained a medical degree but does not yet have a license to practice medicine unsupervised. There is also sometimes confusion between internal medicine and family medicine, with people mistakenly considering them equivalent.

Internal medicine is also recognized as a specialty within clinical pharmacy and veterinary medicine.

== Etymology and historical development ==
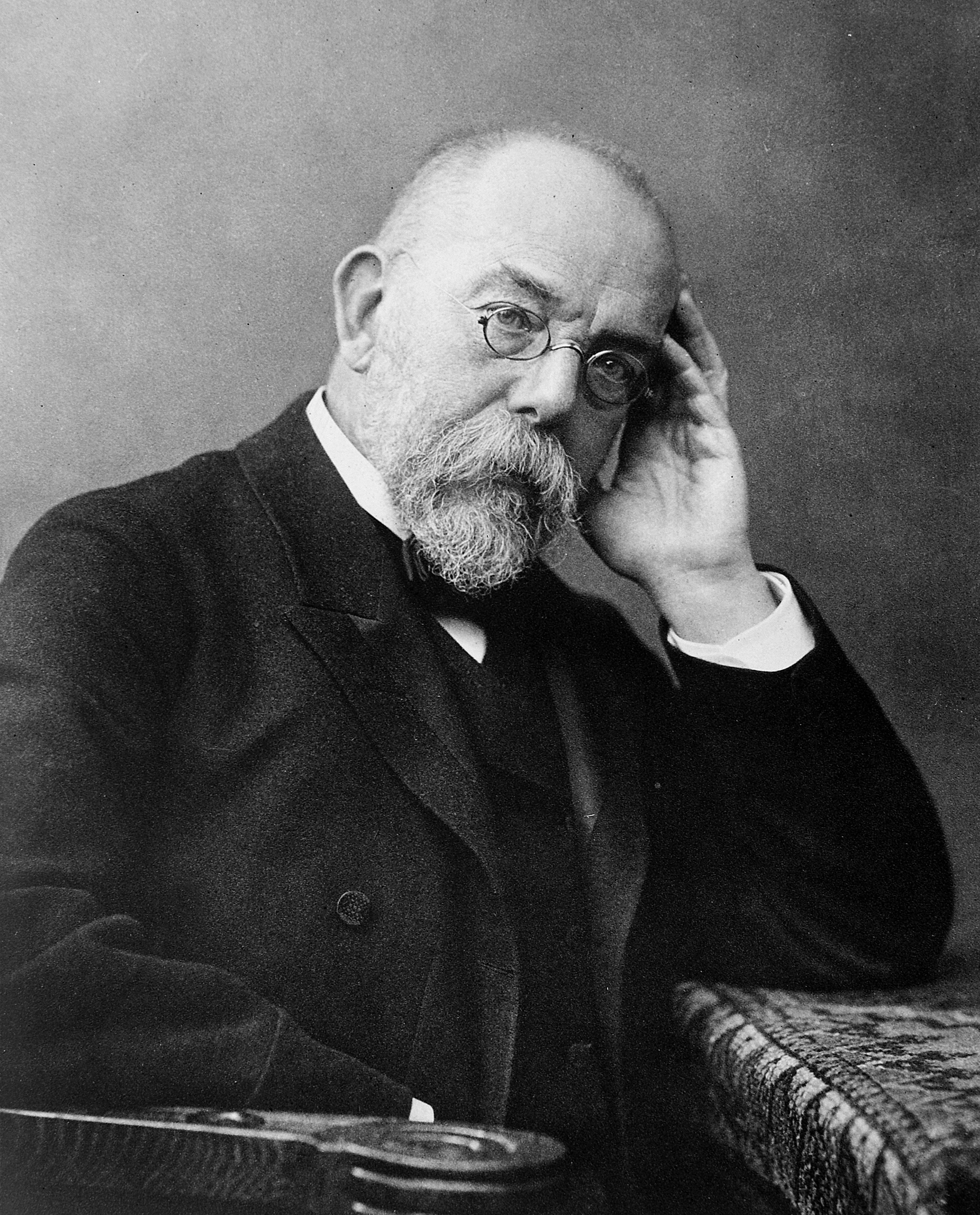
Robert Koch, 19th century German physician and microbiologist

The term internal medicine in English has its etymology in the 19th-century German term Innere Medizin. Originally, internal medicine focused on determining the underlying "internal" or pathological causes of symptoms and syndromes through a combination of medical tests and bedside clinical examination of patients. It emphasized treatment of the diseases affecting the internal organs of the body. This approach differed from earlier generations of physicians, such as the 17th-century English physician Thomas Sydenham, known as the father of English medicine or "the English Hippocrates." Sydenham developed the field of nosology (the study of diseases) through a clinical approach that involved diagnosing and managing diseases based on careful bedside observation of the natural history of disease and their treatment. Sydenham emphasized understanding the internal mechanisms and causes of symptoms rather than dissecting cadavers and scrutinizing the internal workings of the body.

In the 17th century, there was a shift towards anatomical pathology and laboratory studies, and Giovanni Battista Morgagni, an Italian anatomist of the 18th century, is considered the father of anatomical pathology. Laboratory investigations gained increasing significance, with contributions from physicians like German physician and bacteriologist Robert Koch in the 19th century. During this time, internal medicine emerged as a field that integrated the clinical approach with the use of investigations. Many American doctors of the early 20th century studied medicine in Germany and introduced this medical field to the United States, adopting the name "internal medicine" in imitation of the existing German term.

Internal medicine has historical roots in ancient India and ancient China. The earliest texts about internal medicine can be found in the Ayurvedic anthologies of Charaka.

== Role of internal medicine specialists ==
Internal medicine specialists, also referred to as general internal medicine specialists or general medicine physicians in Commonwealth countries, are specialized doctors trained to manage complex or multisystem disease conditions that single-organ specialists may not be equipped to handle. They are often called upon to address undifferentiated presentations that do not fit neatly within the scope of a single-organ specialty, such as shortness of breath, fatigue, weight loss, chest pain, confusion, or alterations in conscious state. They may manage serious acute illnesses that affect multiple organ systems concurrently within a single patient, as well as the management of multiple chronic diseases in a single patient.

While many practitioners of internal medicine choose to subspecialize in specific organ systems, general internal medicine specialists do not necessarily possess any lesser expertise than single-organ specialists. Rather, they are specifically trained to care for patients with multiple simultaneous problems or complex comorbidities.

Due to the complexity involved in explaining the treatment of diseases that are not localized to a single organ, there has been some confusion surrounding the meaning of internal medicine and the role of an "internist". Although internists may serve as providers of primary care, the term is not synonymous with "family doctor", "family practitioner" or "general practitioner" (GP). The training of internists is solely focused on adults and does not typically include surgery, obstetrics, or pediatrics. According to the American College of Physicians, internists are defined as doctors "who specialize in the prevention, detection, and treatment of illnesses in adults." While there may be some overlap in the patient population served by both internal medicine and family medicine doctors, internists primarily focus on adult care with an emphasis on diagnosis, whereas family medicine incorporates a holistic approach to care for the entire family unit. Internists also receive substantial training in various recognized subspecialties within the field and are experienced in both inpatient and outpatient settings. On the other hand, family doctors receive education covering a wide range of conditions and typically train in an outpatient setting with less exposure to hospital settings. The historical roots of internal medicine can be traced back to the incorporation of scientific principles into medical practice in the 1800s, while family medicine emerged as part of the primary care movement in the 1960s.

== Education and training ==
The training and career pathways for internists vary considerably across different countries.

Many programs require previous undergraduate education prior to medical school admission. This "pre-medical" education is typically four or five years in length. Graduate medical education programs vary in length by country. Medical education programs are tertiary-level courses, undertaken at a medical school attached to a university. In the US, medical school consists of four years. Hence, gaining a basic medical education may typically take eight years, depending on jurisdiction and university.

Following completion of entry-level training, newly graduated medical practitioners are often required to undertake a period of supervised practice before their licensure, or registration, is granted, typically one or two years. This period may be referred to as "internship", "conditional registration", or "foundation programme". Then, doctors may follow specialty training in internal medicine if they wish, typically being selected to training programs through competition. In North America, this period of postgraduate training is referred to as residency training, followed by an optional fellowship if the internist decides to train in a subspecialty.

In most countries, residency training for internal medicine lasts three years and centers on secondary and tertiary levels of health care, as opposed to primary health care. In Commonwealth countries, trainees are often called senior house officers for four years after the completion of their medical degree (foundation and core years). After this period, they are able to advance to registrar grade when they undergo a compulsory subspecialty training (including acute internal medicine or a dual subspecialty including internal medicine). This latter stage of training is achieved through competition rather than just by yearly progress as the first years of postgraduate training.

== Certification ==
In the US, three organizations are responsible for the certification of trained internists (i.e., doctors who have completed an accredited residency training program) in terms of their knowledge, skills, and attitudes that are essential for patient care: the American Board of Internal Medicine, the American Osteopathic Board of Internal Medicine and the Board of Certification in Internal Medicine. In the UK, the General Medical Council oversees licensing and certification of internal medicine physicians. The Royal Australasian College of Physicians confers fellowship to internists (and sub-specialists) in Australia. The Medical Council of Canada oversees licensing of internists in Canada.

=== Subspecialties ===
==== United States of America ====
In the US, two organizations are responsible for certification of subspecialists within the field: the American Board of Internal Medicine and the American Osteopathic Board of Internal Medicine. Doctors (not only internists) who successfully pass board exams receive "board certified" status.

===== American Board of Internal Medicine =====
The following are the subspecialties recognized by the American Board of Internal Medicine.

- Adolescent medicine
- Adult congenital heart disease
- Advanced heart failure and transplant cardiology
- Cardiovascular disease, dealing with disorders of the heart and blood vessels*
- Clinical cardiac electrophysiology
- Critical care medicine, is dealing with life-threatening conditions requiring intensive monitoring and treatment.
- Endocrinology, diabetes & metabolism, dealing with disorders of the endocrine system and its specific secretions called hormones
- Gastroenterology, concerned with the field of digestive diseases
- Geriatric medicine
- Hematology, concerned with blood, the blood-forming organs and its disorders.
- Hospice & palliative medicine
- Infectious disease, concerned with disease caused by a biological agent such as by a virus, bacterium or parasite
- Interventional cardiology
- Medical oncology, dealing with the chemotherapeutic (chemical) and/or immunotherapeutic (immunological) treatment of cancer
- Nephrology, dealing with the study of the function and diseases of the kidney
- Neurocritical care
- Pulmonary disease, dealing with diseases of the lungs and the respiratory tract
- Rheumatology, devoted to the diagnosis and therapy of rheumatic diseases
- Sleep medicine
- Sports medicine
- Transplant hepatology

===== American Board of Allergy and Immunology =====
- Allergy and immunology, concerned with the diagnosis, treatment and management of allergies, asthma and disorders of the immune system.

===== American College of Osteopathic Internists =====
The American College of Osteopathic Internists recognizes the following subspecialties:

- Allergy/immunology
- Cardiology
- Cardiac electrophysiology
- Critical care medicine
- Endocrinology
- Gastroenterology
- Geriatrics
- Hematology/oncology
- Interventional cardiology
- Infectious diseases
- Nephrology
- Oncology
- Palliative care medicine
- Pulmonary Diseases
- Pulmonology
- Rheumatology
- Sleep medicine

==== United Kingdom ====
In the United Kingdom, the three medical Royal Colleges (the Royal College of Physicians of London, the Royal College of Physicians of Edinburgh and the Royal College of Physicians and Surgeons of Glasgow) are responsible for setting curricula and training programmes through the Joint Royal Colleges Postgraduate Training Board (JRCPTB), although the process is monitored and accredited by the independent General Medical Council (which also maintains the specialist register).

Doctors who have completed medical school spend two years in foundation training completing a basic postgraduate curriculum. After two years of Core Medical Training (CT1/CT2), or three years of Internal Medicine Training (IMT1/IMT2/IMT3) as of 2019, since and attaining the Membership of the Royal College of Physicians, physicians commit to one of the medical specialties:

- Acute internal medicine (with possible subspecialty in stroke medicine)
- Allergy
- Audio vestibular medicine
- Aviation and space medicine
- Cardiology (with possible subspecialty in stroke medicine)
- Clinical genetics
- Clinical neurophysiology
- Clinical oncology
- Clinical pharmacology and therapeutics (with possible subspecialty in stroke medicine)
- Dermatology
- Endocrinology and diabetes mellitus
- Gastroenterology (with possible subspecialty in hepatology)
- General (internal) medicine (with possible subspecialty in metabolic medicine or stroke medicine)
- Genito-urinary medicine
- Geriatric medicine (with possible subspecialty in stroke medicine)
- Haematology
- Immunology
- Infectious diseases
- Intensive care medicine
- Medical microbiology
- Medical oncology (clinical or radiation oncology falls under the Royal College of Radiologists, although entry is through CMT and MRCP is required)
- Medical ophthalmology
- Medical virology
- Neurology (with possible subspecialty in stroke medicine)
- Nuclear medicine
- Occupational medicine
- Paediatric cardiology (the only pediatric subspecialty not under the Royal College of Paediatrics and Child Health)
- Palliative medicine
- Rehabilitation medicine (with possible subspecialty in stroke medicine)
- Renal medicine
- Respiratory medicine
- Rheumatology
- Sport and exercise medicine
- Tropical medicine

Many training programmes provide dual accreditation with general (internal) medicine and are involved in the general care to hospitalised patients. These are acute medicine, cardiology, Clinical Pharmacology and Therapeutics, endocrinology and diabetes mellitus, gastroenterology, infectious diseases, renal medicine, respiratory medicine and often, rheumatology. The role of general medicine, after a period of decline, was reemphasised by the Royal College of Physicians of London report from the Future Hospital Commission (2013).

==== European Union ====
The European Board of Internal Medicine (EBIM) was formed as a collaborative effort between the European Union of Medical Specialists (UEMS) - Internal Medicine Section and the European Federation of Internal Medicine (EFIM) to provide guidance on standardizing training and practice of internal medicine throughout Europe. The EBIM published training requirements in 2016 for postgraduate education in internal medicine, and efforts to create a European Certificate of Internal Medicine (ECIM) to facilitate the free movement of medical professionals with the EU are currently underway.

The internal medicine specialist is recognized in every country in the European Union and typically requires five years of multi-disciplinary post-graduate education. The specialty of internal medicine is seen as providing care in a wide variety of conditions involving every organ system and is distinguished from family medicine in that the latter provides a broader model of care the includes both surgery and obstetrics in both adults and children.

==== Australia ====
Accreditation for medical education and training programs in Australia is provided by the Australian Medical Council (AMC) and the Medical Council of New Zealeand (MCNZ). The Medical Board of Australia (MBA) is the registering body for Australian doctors and provides information to the Australian Health Practitioner Regulation Agency (AHPRA). Medical graduates apply for provisional registration in order to complete intern training. Those completing an accredited internship program are then eligible to apply for general registration. Once the candidate completes the required basic and advanced post-graduate training and a written and clinical examination, the Royal Australasian College of Physicians confers designation Fellow of the Royal Australasian College of Physicians (FRACP). Basic training consists of three years of full-time equivalent (FTE) training (including intern year) and advanced training consists of 3–4 years, depending on specialty. The fields of specialty practice are approved by the Council of Australian Governments (COAG) and managed by the MBA. The following is a list of currently recognized specialist physicians.

- Cardiology
- Clinical genetics
- Clinical pharmacology
- Endocrinology
- Gastroenterology and hepatology
- General medicine
- Geriatric medicine
- Haemotology
- Immunology and allergy
- Infectious diseases
- Medical oncology
- Nephrology
- Neurology
- Nuclear medicine
- Respiratory and sleep medicine
- Rheumatology

==== Canada ====
After completing medical school, internists in Canada require an additional four years of training. Internists desiring to subspecialize are required to complete two additional years of training that may begin after the third year of internist training. The Royal College of Physicians and Surgeons of Canada (RCPSC) is a national non-profit agency that oversees and accredits medical education in Canada. A full medical license in Internal Medicine in Canada requires a medical degree, a license from the Medical Council of Canada, completion of the required post-graduate education, and certification from the RCPSC. Any additional requirements from separate medical regulatory authorities in each province or territory is also required. Internists may practice in Canada as generalists in Internal Medicine or serve in one of seventeen subspecialty areas. Internists may work in many settings including outpatient clinics, inpatient wards, critical care units, and emergency departments. The currently recognized subspecialties include the following:

- Critical care medicine
- Cardiology
- Infectious diseases
- Neurology
- Respiratory medicine
- Rheumatology
- Endocrinology and metabolism
- Gastroenterology
- General internal medicine
- Geriatrics
- Hematology
- Medical oncology
- Clinical allergy and immunology
- Dermatology
- Nephrology

== Medical diagnosis and treatment ==
Medicine is mainly focused on the art of diagnosis and treatment with medication. The diagnostic process involves gathering data, generating one or more diagnostic hypotheses, and iteratively testing these potential diagnoses against dynamic disease profiles to determine the best course of action for the patient.

=== Gathering data ===
Data may be gathered directly from the patient in medical history-taking and physical examination. Previous medical records including laboratory findings, imaging, and clinical notes from other doctors is also an important source of information; however, it is vital to talk to and examine the patient to find out what the patient is currently experiencing to make an accurate diagnosis.

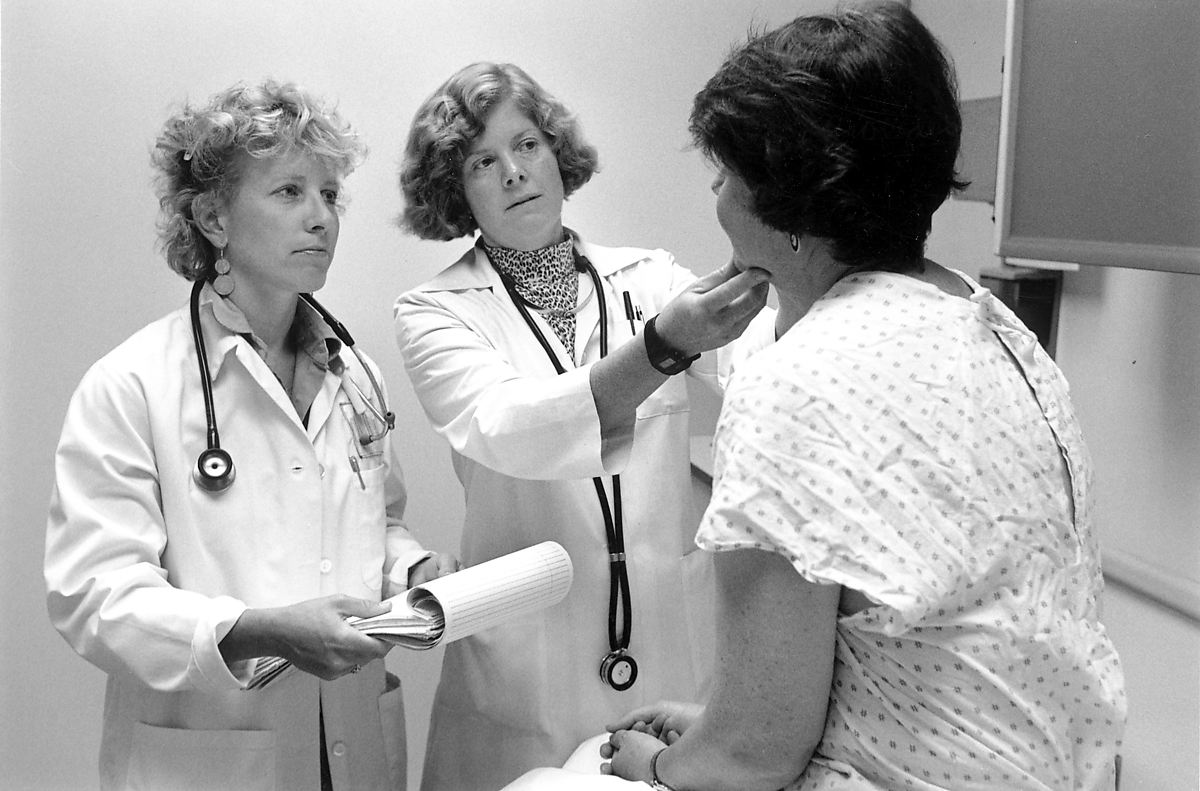
History and physical examination are a vital part of the diagnostic process.

Internists often can perform and interpret diagnostic tests like EKGs and ultrasound imaging (Point-of-care Ultrasound – PoCUS).

Internists who pursue sub-specialties have additional diagnostic tools, including those listed below.

- Cardiology: angioplasty, cardioversion, cardiac ablation, intra-aortic balloon pump
- Critical care medicine: mechanical ventilation
- Gastroenterology: endoscopy and ERCP
- Nephrology: dialysis
- Pulmonology: bronchoscopy

Other tests are ordered, and patients are also referred to specialists for further evaluation. The effectiveness and efficiency of the specialist referral process is an area of potential improvement.

=== Generating diagnostic hypotheses ===
Determining which pieces of information are most important to the next phase of the diagnostic process is of vital importance. It is during this stage that clinical bias like anchoring or premature closure may be introduced. Once key findings are determined, they are compared to profiles of possible diseases. These profiles include findings that are typically associated with the disease and are based on the likelihood that someone with the disease has a particular symptom. A list of potential diagnoses is termed the "differential diagnosis" for the patient and is typically ordered from most likely to least likely, with special attention given to those conditions that have dire consequences for the patient if they were missed. Epidemiology and endemic conditions are also considered in creating and evaluating the list of diagnoses.

The list is dynamic and changes as the doctor obtains additional information that makes a condition more ("rule-in") or less ("rule-out") likely based on the disease profile. The list is used to determine what information will be acquired next, including which diagnostic test or imaging modality to order. The selection of tests is also based on the doctor's knowledge of the specificity and sensitivity of a particular test.

An important part of this process is knowledge of the various ways that a disease can present in a patient. This knowledge is gathered and shared to add to the database of disease profiles used by doctors. This is especially important in rare diseases.

=== Communication ===
Communication is a vital part of the diagnostic process. The Internist uses both synchronous and asynchronous communication with other members of the medical care team, including other internists, radiologists, specialists, and laboratory technicians. Tools to evaluate teamwork exist and have been employed in multiple settings.

Communication to the patient is also important to ensure there is informed consent and shared decision-making throughout the diagnostic process.

=== Treatment ===
Treatment modalities generally include both pharmacological and non-pharmacological, depending on the primary diagnosis. Additional treatment options include referral to specialist care including physical therapy and rehabilitation. Treatment recommendations differ in the acute inpatient and outpatient settings. Continuity of care and long-term follow-up is crucial in successful patient outcomes.

=== Prevention and other services ===
Aside from diagnosing and treating acute conditions, the Internist may also assess disease risk and recommend preventive screening and intervention. Some of the tools available to the Internist include genetic evaluation.

Internists also routinely provide pre-operative medical evaluations including individualized assessment and communication of operative risk.

Training the next generation of internists is an important part of the profession. As mentioned above, post-graduate medical education is provided by licensed doctors as part of accredited education programs that are usually affiliated with teaching hospitals. Studies show that there are no differences in patient outcomes in teaching versus non-teaching facilities. Medical research is an important part of most post-graduate education programs, and many licensed doctors continue to be involved in research activities after completing post-graduate training.

== Ethics ==
Inherent in any medical profession are legal and ethical considerations. Specific laws vary by jurisdiction and may or may not be congruent with ethical considerations. Thus, a strong ethical foundation is paramount to any medical profession. Medical ethics guidelines in the Western world typically follow four principles including beneficence, non-maleficence, patient autonomy, and justice. These principles underlie the doctor–patient relationship and the obligation to put the welfare and interests of the patient above their own.

=== Doctor–patient relationship ===
The relationship is built upon the doctor's obligations of competency, respect for the patient, and appropriate referrals while the patient requirements include decision-making and provides or withdraws consent for any treatment plan. Good communication is key to a strong relationship but has ethical considerations as well, including proper use of electronic communication and clear documentation.

=== Treatment and telemedicine ===
Providing treatment including prescribing medications based on remote information gathering without a proper established relationship is not accepted as good practice with few exceptions. These exceptions include cross-coverage within a practice and certain public health urgent or emergent issues.

The ethics of telemedicine including questions on its impact to diagnosis, doctor-patient relationship, and continuity of care have been raised. However, with appropriate use and specific guidelines, risks may be minimized and the benefits including increased access to care may be realized.

=== Financial issues and conflicts of interest ===
Ethical considerations in financial include accurate billing practices and clearly defined financial relationships. Doctors have both a professional duty and obligation under the justice principle to ensure that patients are provided the same care regardless of status or ability to pay. However, informal copayment forgiveness may have legal ramifications and the providing professional courtesy may have negatively impact care.

Dotors must disclose all possible conflicts of interest including financial relationships, investments, research and referral relationships, and any other instances that may subjugate or give the appearance of subjugating patient care to self-interest.

=== Other topics ===
Other foundational ethical considerations include privacy, confidentiality, accurate and complete medical records, electronic health records, disclosure, and informed decision-making and consent.

Electronic health records have been shown to improve patient care but have risks including data breaches and inappropriate and/or unauthorized disclosure of protected health information.

Withholding information from a patient is typically seen as unethical and in violation of a patient's right to make informed decisions. However, in situations where a patient has requested not to be informed or to have the information provided to a second party or in an emergency situation in which the patient does not have decision-making capacity, withholding information may be appropriate.

== See also ==
- Royal Australasian College of Physicians
- Royal College of Physicians and Surgeons of Canada
