= American College of Osteopathic Internists =

US medical association

- Formation: 1941
- Type: Professional association
- Headquarters: Arlington, Virginia
- Location: United States
- Members: 15,000
- Official language: English
- President: C. Clark Milton, DO, FACOI
- Website: acoi.org

C. Clark Milton, DO, FACOI: 2026-2027 ACOI President

The American College of Osteopathic Internists (ACOI) is a medical association in the United States representing osteopathic physicians who specialize in internal medicine. The ACOI is one of two professional organizations representing internal medicine physicians in the United States, the other organization is the American College of Physicians. ACOI is accredited by the American Osteopathic Association (AOA) and the Accreditation Council for Continuing Medical Education (ACCME).

== History ==
ACOI was founded in 1923 as the American Society of Osteopathic Internists. In 1941, the organization adopted its current name, American College of Osteopathic Internists.

== Membership ==
Membership levels are student, resident/fellow, active, retired, emeritus, and associate. Active members are physicians (DO and MD degrees) who have completed internal medicine training and hold a valid license to practice. Associate members are physicians trained in any other specialty than internal medicine (e.g., emergency medicine, family medicine, obgyn, etc.) or healthcare professionals.

Notable members include Karen J. Nichols, DO, MACOI, the first female president of ACOI and former medical school dean; Humayun J. Chaudhry, DO, MACOI, MS, president and chief executive officer of the Federation of State Medical Boards (FSMB) of the United States; and Robert A. Cain, DO, MACOI, president and CEO of the American Association of Colleges of Osteopathic Medicine (AACOM).

== Publications ==
- ACOinfo: ACOI's member publication featuring organizational news, educational opportunities, professional developments, and upcoming events for osteopathic internal medicine physicians and subspecialists.
- ACOI Student Spotlight: ACOI's publication for student members, providing updates on educational resources, upcoming events, professional development opportunities, and news relevant to students pursuing careers in osteopathic internal medicine.

== Fellows ==
The honor of fellow is bestowed upon members who exhibit dedication to the profession. The recipient receives becomes a Fellow of the American College of Osteopathic Internists, which is abbreviated FACOI. Honorary versions of this award are also given. On November 14, 1979, Linus Pauling received an Honorary Fellow of the American College of Osteopathic Internists by the ACOI for delivering a presentation at the ACOI Convocation.

The Gillum Society of Master Fellows was established in 1994 to honor fellows who have demonstrated outstanding past and present contributions to the College or to osteopathic internal medicine on a local, regional, or national level. The Society is named for Grover Gillum, DO, a past president of ACOI and was department chairman and residency program director at the Department of Internal Medicine at the Kansas City College of Osteopathy.

== Awards ==
ACOI recognizes excellence and leadership in osteopathic internal medicine through honors and awards that celebrate members’ achievements, contributions to the profession, and commitment to medical education. Annual Awards include the Internist of the Year, the Teacher of the Year, and the Research of the Year.

In 2024, ACOI established memorial awards to honor the legacy of two remarkable long-time members:

The Anthony J. Malcoun Emerging Leader Award recognizes an outstanding resident or fellow. The award is named for Anthony J. Malcoun, DO, MACOI, a past president of ACOI, who received the ACOI Internist of the Year in 2014.

David Susser Award recognizes internal medicine residents. The award is named for David Susser, DO, MACOI, a past president of ACOI, and cardiologist and former head of Internal Medicine at Botsford Hospital (Michigan).

In 2025, ACOI introduced the Robert G. Good, DO, MACOI Student Leadership Award which recognizes an outstanding osteopathic medical student leader who exemplifies the dedication, commitment, and selfless service. Dr. Good is a Master Fellow and a past president of the American College of Osteopathic Internists.

== See also ==
- American Osteopathic Board of Internal Medicine
- American Osteopathic Board of Surgery
