= Women's Voices for the Earth =

- Abbreviation: WVE
- Formation: 1995; 31 years ago
- Type: Nonprofit
- Tax ID no.: 85-0501011
- Purpose: Environmentalism, feminism, women's health
- Headquarters: Missoula, Montana
- Board Chair: Aimée R. Thorne-Thomsen
- Executive Director: Amber Garcia
- Board of directors: Aimée R. Thorne-Thomsen; Dr. Nicole Acevedo; Boma Brown-West; Debra Erenberg; Cynthia Gutierrez; Amanda Klasing; Monica Schrock; Kyra Naumoff Shields; Karen Wang
- Website: womensvoices.org

Women's Voices for the Earth (WVE) is a feminist, women-led, North American environmental organization that specializes in research and advocacy regarding toxic chemicals used in products that disproportionately impact women's health, including cosmetics, menstrual care products, professional salon and cleaning products. WVE is a non-profit organization (501(c)(3)) whose mission is to amplify women's voices to eliminate toxics that harm communities and health. Addressing the inter-connectivity of these various channels of exposure to toxic chemicals has been key to WVE's approach which is multi-scalar: targeting consumer behaviors, corporate practices, and government policies.

== History ==
Women's Voices for the Earth (WVE) began in Missoula, Montana, in 1995 in response to a lack of diversity in the environmental movement. Early work focused on local issues including, reducing pesticide spraying by state and local agencies, addressing air pollution from a nearby mill, and stopping a proposed goldmine on Montana's Blackfoot River. In 2007, WVE went national to address toxic chemicals exposures through production, distribution, use and disposal of products.

== Initiatives and Recognition ==
2020

• Passes the Cosmetic Fragrance and Flavor Ingredient Right to Know Act of 2020 (SB312-Leyva), making California the first government in the world to require the public disclosure of hazardous fragrance and flavor ingredients.

2019

• Passes bill A.164-A/S.2387-B in New York (introduced by Assemblymember Linda Rosenthal and Senator Roxanne Persaud), making it the first state in the nation to require period product makers to disclose ingredients.
• Moves Summer's Eve to remove harmful colorants from their vaginal washes, as well as specific preservatives linked to cancer.

2018

• Passes worker and consumer health bill in California, AB 2775 (Assemblymember Ash Kalra), requiring manufacturers to disclose ingredients on the labels of professional cosmetics with co-sponsors, California Healthy Nail Salon Collaborative, Black Women for Wellness and Breast Cancer Prevention Partners
• Releases new data on fragrance ingredients, revealing a third of all fragrance chemicals currently in use are either known to be toxic, or considered potentially toxic by scientists around the world.
• Releases in-depth investigative report on the Cosmetic Ingredient Review (CIR) Panel's failure to protect the public and manufacturers.

2017

• Moves Procter & Gamble, the world's largest consumer products company, to voluntarily start disclosing all fragrance ingredients above 0.01% in their products, including period care products, cleaning and personal care products.
• Passes state bill SB 258, The Cleaning Product Right to Know Act of 2017, which requires disclosure of ingredients used in institutional and household cleaning products on product label and online.
• Hosts a rally in Washington, DC with support of Congresswoman Grace Meng to increase awareness of the need for menstrual care product safety.

2016

• Commissions and releases a GreenScreen for Safer Chemicals analysis of the fragrance chemical, Galaxolide, revealing the chemical is highly toxic to aquatic life and persistent, meaning it does not break down easily in the environment.
• Files a joint lawsuit with Environmental Working Group (EWG) against the Food and Drug Administration for its failure to protect the public and professional salon workers from dangers associated with popular hair straightening treatments.
• Petitions the FDA to address harmful colorants in vaginal washes, highlighting that colorants found in some washes come in contact with vaginal mucous membranes – violating the FDA's use restrictions.

2015

• Moves two of the world's largest manufacturers of menstrual care products — Procter & Gamble and Kimberly Clark — to start disclosing ingredients used in their tampons and pads.
• Releases first of its kind report, Unpacking the Fragrance Industry: Policy Failures, the Trade Secret Myth and Public Health, on the failures of the fragrance industry's self-regulated safety program.

2014

• Convinces SC Johnson & Son to disclose all fragrance ingredients down to .09% in their products.
• Releases Beauty and Its Beast: Unmasking the Impacts of Toxic Chemicals on Salon Workers a report that documents the impact of exposure to toxic chemicals on salon worker health.
• Organizes the third annual Healthy Salons Week of Action in Washington DC, with salon workers, to collectively advocate for increased salon worker health, safety and rights.

2013

• Moves Procter and Gamble to reformulate and drastically reduce the carcinogen 1,4 dioxane from their laundry detergents.
• Releases Chem Fatale: Potential Health Effects of Toxic Chemicals in Feminine Care Products.

2012

• Releases Secret Scents: How Hidden Fragrance Allergens Harm Public Health, moving Simple Green, Clorox, and Reckitt-Benckiser to agree to disclose hidden allergens in fragrance.
• Convinced Johnson & Johnson, one of the largest cosmetic companies in the world, to phase out chemicals that can cause cancer and harm health from all of its products in 57 countries.

2011

• Convinced the U.S. Food and Drug Administration and Occupational Safety and Health Administration to issue a warning letter and hazard alert on the formaldehyde-containing Brazilian Blowout hair straightening :treatment.
• Convinced Clorox to become the first mainstream cleaning product company to disclose all ingredients in their products, including a master list of :fragrance ingredients, and to remove synthetic musks.

2010

• Convinced Simple Green to remove phthalates and synthetic musks from products.
• Released "Not So Sexy" on toxic chemicals in leading perfumes and cologne and "No Silver Lining" on BPA in common canned goods.
• Advocated for introduction of Safe Cosmetics Act in Congress.

2009

• Convinced SC Johnson & Son to disclose all of the ingredients in their cleaning products on a :website and to remove phthalates from all their products.
• Released "Disinfectant Overkill", a report on the health impacts linked to overuse of disinfectant products.
• Co-sponsored the research convening "Framing a Research Agenda for Change: Advancing Worker Health and Safety for the Cosmetology and Nail Salon :Communities"
• Joined Earthjustice in suing four leading cleaning product manufacturers for failing to follow a New York law that requires them to disclose the ingredients they use in their products

2008

• Set an industry precedent for ingredient communication by influencing the Soap and Detergent Association and the Consumer Specialty Products Association to release a voluntary ingredient communication plan, paving the way for broad consumer right-to-know efforts.
• Reached more than 14,000 women in their homes through the creation of the Green Cleaning Party Kit, a tool to educate and activate women on toxic chemicals in cleaning products.
• Released "A Little Prettier" on companies' declining use of phthalates in personal care products and cosmetics.

2007 and prior

• Co-founded the National Healthy Nail Salon Alliance, a network of some 35 organizations, scientific researchers, advocates and government agencies working to protect and improve the health and welfare of women working in the nation's nail salons.
• Helped found and lead the national Campaign for Safe Cosmetics, a national coalition of organizations working to protect the health of consumers and workers by requiring the health and beauty industry to phase out the use of chemicals linked to cancer, birth defects and other health problems, and replace them with safer alternatives.
• Helped convince OPI Inc., the largest global manufacturer of nail products for salons, to eliminate several major chemicals of concern from their nail polish products.
• Co-founded Coming Clean Collaboration, a national network of more than 60 organizations working to change the practices of the chemical industry.
• Participated in regional and national studies of women's breast milk to examine the presence of toxic flame retardants and PCBs.
• Organized a successful grassroots campaign, with hundreds of women in Montana and Idaho, to convince Albertsons Inc., one of the nation's leading :supermarket chains, to post visible warnings about mercury contamination in fish.
• Helped found and lead the Montana Women Vote Project (MWV), which registers and educates new voters during election years.
• Closed down or scaled back incinerators, labs and power plants, in conjunction with women at the grassroots level in Montana, Idaho and other states.

== Current campaigns and programs ==
=== Legislative work ===
- Menstrual Products Right to Know Act

Requires all manufacturers of tampons, pads, menstrual cups and period underwear to disclose ingredients.

- Robin Danielson Feminine Hygiene Product Safety Act

The bill directs the National Institute of Health to research the impact ingredients in menstrual and intimate care products (including products like tampons, pads, wipes, washes and douches) have on women's health.

- California AB 1989 - Opposition

Aims to increase transparency in period care products, but continues to restrict vital ingredient information necessary to protect public health.

- Cosmetic Fragrance and Flavor Ingredient Right to Know Act of 2020 (SB312-Leyva)

Requires manufacturers to disclose ingredients deemed toxic by authoritative bodies in flavor and fragrance ingredients to the California Safe Cosmetics Program.

- Citizen's Petition to the FDA: Ban Formaldehyde from Hair Straighteners

Filed a citizen's petition asking the FDA to review the safety of hair straighteners and health risks these products pose to salon workers.

=== Market campaigns ===
- Detox the Box

Given the widespread use of menstrual care products, the unique route of exposure, and the lack of regulatory oversight, WVE is working to eliminate toxic chemicals from the $3 billion U.S. period and intimate care products market.

- Johnson & Johnson's Toxic Talc

In May 2020, Johnson & Johnson (J&J) announced it will stop selling its popular talc-based baby powder—which is linked to ovarian cancer in the US and Canada. However, J&J refuses to stop selling this dangerous product globally.

- Summer's Deceive

Calling out harmful marketing and toxic chemicals found in Summer's Eve wipes, washes, powders and sprays.

- Brazilian Blowout

Several leading brands of hair straightening products have been found to contain high levels of formaldehyde (up to 10%) even when labeled "formaldehyde-free." Formaldehyde gas can be severely irritating to the eyes, nose, and throat, and long term exposure to formaldehyde in the workplace has been linked to increased risk of cancer.

- Quit the Quats

Highlights health impacts from the use of antibacterial chemicals commonly found in disinfecting products like wipes, sprays, and all-purpose cleaners, and offers guidance for safer, certified and effective alternatives.

=== Action groups and workshops ===
- OSOF Workshops (Our Stories, Our Flow)

Virtual conversations about menstruation that center and de-stigmatizes the way we talk about, understand & experience safe, healthy periods.

- PAQ (People Against Quats)

A national action group of concerned people who want to help eliminate or reduce public exposure to quats in places like schools, gyms, apartment buildings, public work places and more.

== Reports and fact sheets ==
WVE reports, fact sheets and resources on health risks associated with chemicals of concern found in menstrual care product, cleaning products, professional salon products, safe cosmetics, as well as in-depth analysis of regulating bodies.

== See also ==
- Silicon Valley Toxics Coalition
