= Karen J. Nichols =

Osteopathic physician and former medical school dean

Karen J. Nichols DO
- Education: Kansas City University College of Osteopathic Medicine; Central Michigan University
- Occupation: Physician
- Known for: Chair of Board of Directors Accreditation Council for Graduate Medical Education

Karen J. Nichols is an American osteopathic physician, former medical school dean at Midwestern University, and current chair of the Board of Directors of the Accreditation Council for Graduate Medical Education.

== Education ==
Karen J. Nichols graduated from Kansas City University College of Osteopathic Medicine. She graduated from Central Michigan University with a master's degree in management, with a specialty in healthcare administration. She completed an internal medicine residency at Oklahoma Osteopathic Hospital (now Oklahoma State University Medical Center).

== Career ==
From 1985 through 2002, Dr. Nichols practiced internal medicine and geriatrics in Mesa, Arizona. From 2000 to 2001, Nichols served as president of the American College of Osteopathic Internists. From 2002 to 2018, she served as dean at Midwestern University Chicago College of Osteopathic Medicine. In 2010 and 2011, she served as the president of the American Osteopathic Association. In 2015, she received the AOA Distinguished Service Certificate.

In 2018, she became vice chair of the Accreditation Council for Graduate Medical Education (ACGME) Board of Directors. In 2019, she was elected chair of the ACGME board of directors. Dr. Nichols serves on the ACGME executive committee and the governance committee. She was the first female president of the American Osteopathic Association, the American College of Osteopathic Internists, and the Arizona Osteopathic Medical Association. She has served on the boards of Kansas City University and the American Osteopathic Foundation.
