= Earle Haas =

American physician and inventor (1888–1981)

- Education: Kansas City College of Osteopathy (D.O.)
- Occupations: Physician, inventor
- Known for: Invented the tampon with an applicator

Earle Haas, D.O. (1888–1981) was an osteopathic physician and inventor of the tampon with an applicator, marketed as "Tampax". He graduated from the Kansas City College of Osteopathy in 1918 and spent 10 years in Wray, Colorado as a country general practitioner, then went to Denver in 1928.

== Inventions ==
He invented a flexible ring for a contraceptive diaphragm (and made $50,000 from selling the patent), sold real estate and was president of a company that manufactured antiseptics.

Haas wanted to invent something better than the "rags" his wife and other women had to wear, he said, and got the idea for his tampon from a friend in California who used a sponge in the vagina to absorb menstrual flow. So he developed a plug of cotton inserted by means of two cardboard tubes; he did not want the woman to have to touch the cotton. He applied for a patent for the "Catamenal device" on November 19, 1931, and was granted U.S. Patent No. 1,926,900 on September 12, 1933.

After failing to get people interested in his invention (including the Johnson & Johnson company), on October 16, 1933, he finally sold the patent and trademark to a Denver businesswoman, Gertrude Tendrich, for $32,000. She started the Tampax company and was its first president. Tendrich was an ambitious German immigrant who made the first Tampax tampons at her home using a sewing machine and Haas's compression machine. Tampons based on Haas' design were first sold in the U.S. in 1936.

The London Sunday Times newspaper in 1969 named Haas one of the "1000 Makers of the Twentieth Century."

After selling the rights to the tampon, he continued with his doctor's practice and various business enterprises. He later regretted selling the rights, but was glad it was successful, and died at 93 in 1981. Up to his death he continued to try to improve the tampon.
