= Robin Danielson Feminine Hygiene Product Safety Act =

Proposed act of the US Congress

The Robin Danielson Feminine Hygiene Product Safety Act is a proposed act of the United States Congress, directing the National Institutes of Health (NIH) to research the possible health risks of menstrual hygiene products made with dioxins, synthetic fibers, chemicals such as chlorine or fragrance irritants. It also called for the Food and Drug Administration (FDA) to monitor dioxin levels in similar hygiene products.

First introduced in 1997 (but renamed in 1999), the bill is named after Robin Danielson, who died in 1998 of toxic shock syndrome, a rare bacterial disease linked to high-absorbency tampon use. Congresswoman Carolyn Maloney has re-introduced the bill a number of times since then, but it has never passed or received significant support.
