= American College of Physicians =

American medical-specialty organization

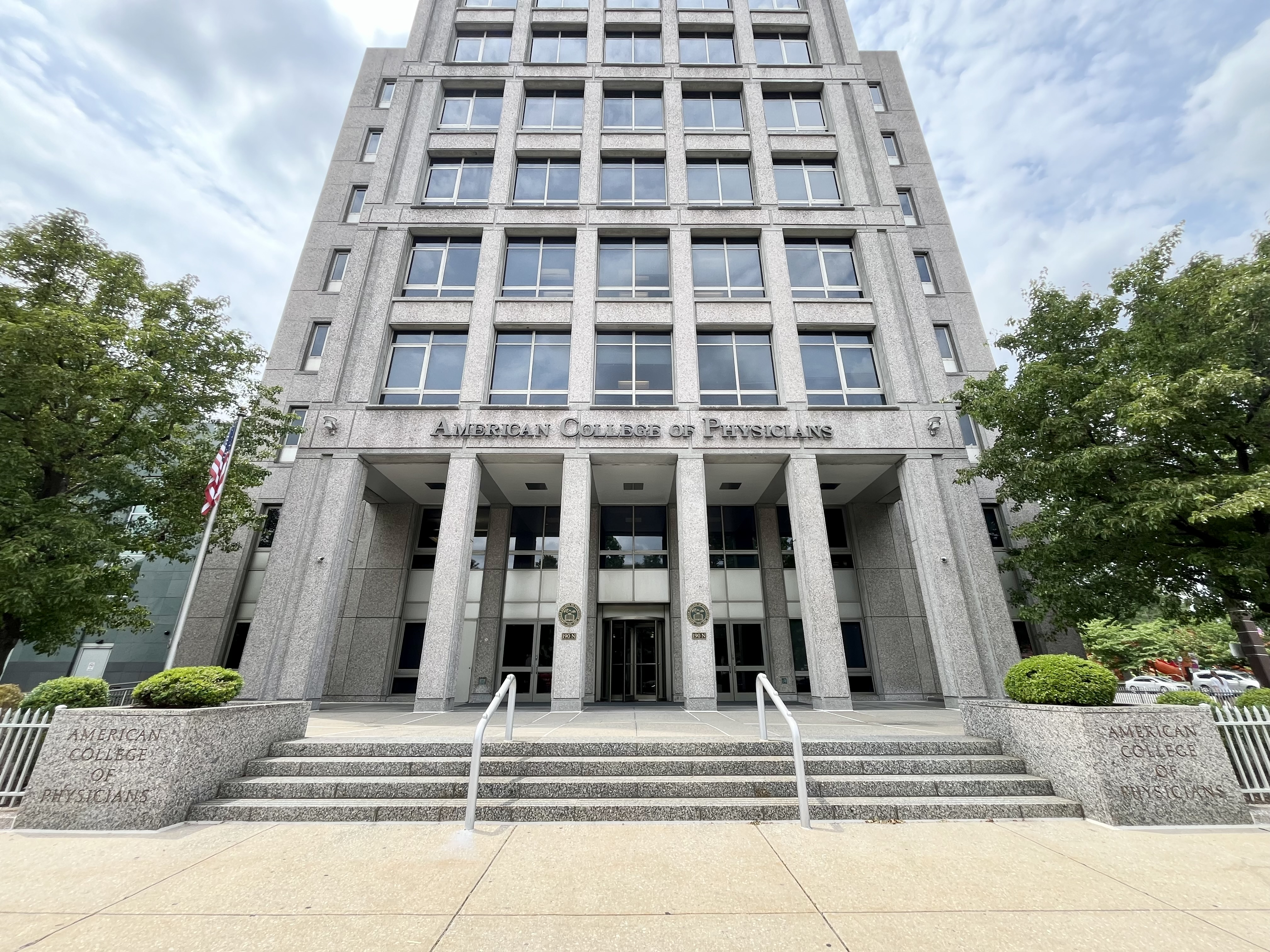
- Headquarters (2024)
- Abbreviation: ACP
- Formation: January 8, 1915
- Headquarters: 190 North Independence Mall, Philadelphia, Pennsylvania, U.S.
- Members: 162,000
- Website: acponline.org

The American College of Physicians (ACP) is a Philadelphia-based national organization of internal medicine physicians, who specialize in the diagnosis, treatment, and care of adults. With 162,000 members, ACP is the largest medical-specialty organization and second-largest physician group in the United States. The ACP is one of two professional organizations representing internal medicine physicians in the United States, and the other organization is the American College of Osteopathic Internists. Its flagship journal, the Annals of Internal Medicine, is among the most widely cited peer-reviewed medical journals in the world.

== History ==
ACP was founded in 1915 to promote the science and practice of medicine. In 1998, it merged with the American Society of Internal Medicine (ASIM). ASIM's focus on the economic, political, and social aspects of medical care both enlarged and complemented its mission.

Known as ACP-ASIM from 1998 to 2003, the organization re-adopted "American College of Physicians" as its corporate name from 2003 on.

== Structure ==
ACP is governed by a Board of Regents, ACP's policy-making body, which manages the business and affairs of ACP and is made up of elected officers. The Board is advised by a network of ACP committees and by the ACP Board of Governors. The Board of Governors comprises elected Governors who implement national projects and initiatives at the chapter level and represent member concerns at the national level. ACP has 162,000 members, 22,000 of which in 168 countries; 85 chapters; and 16 international chapters across 12 countries, per the latest ACP EVP report.

ACP is a founding member of the Council of Medical Subspecialty Societies, which represents 50 subspecialty societies and internal medicine organizations.

== Membership and recognition ==
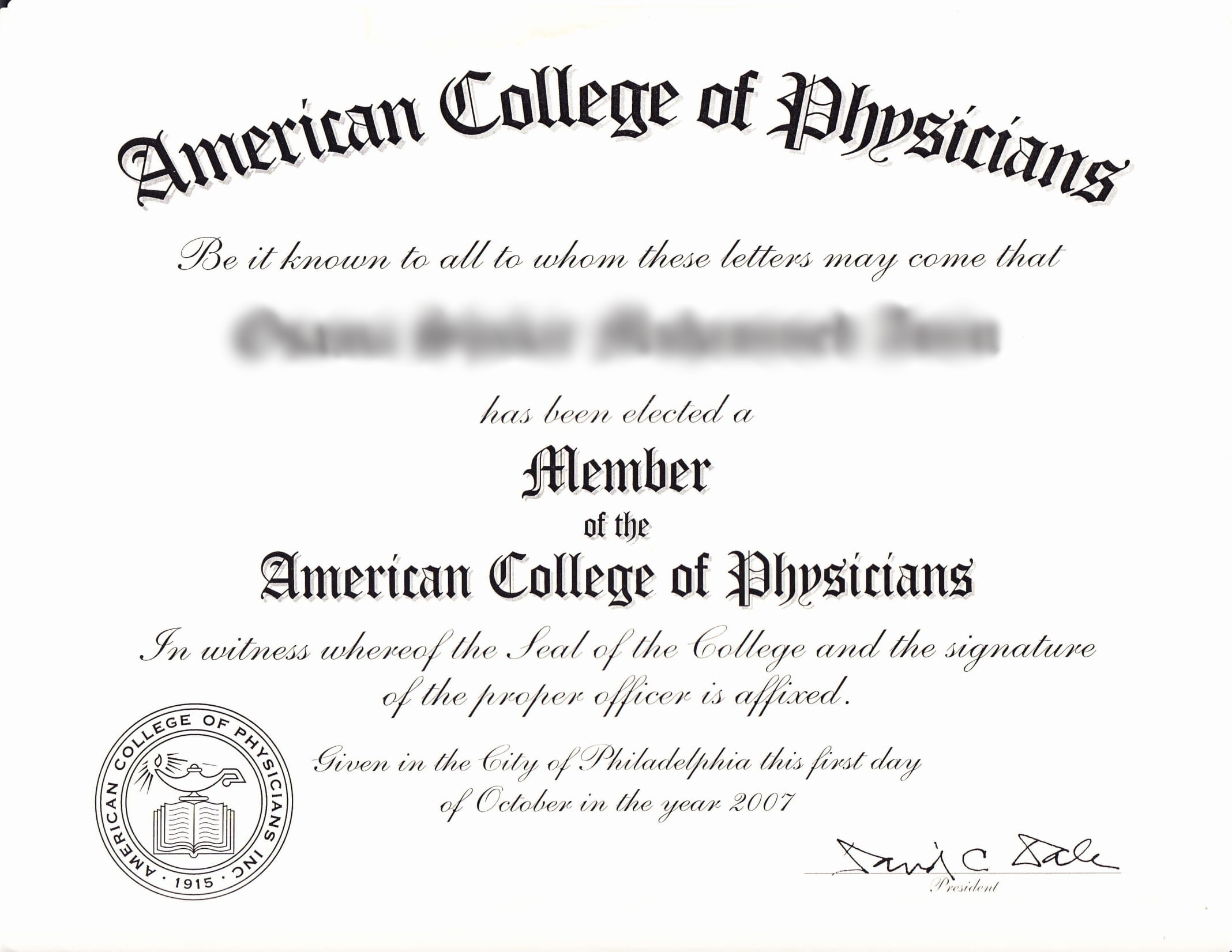
Membership diploma of the American College of Physicians

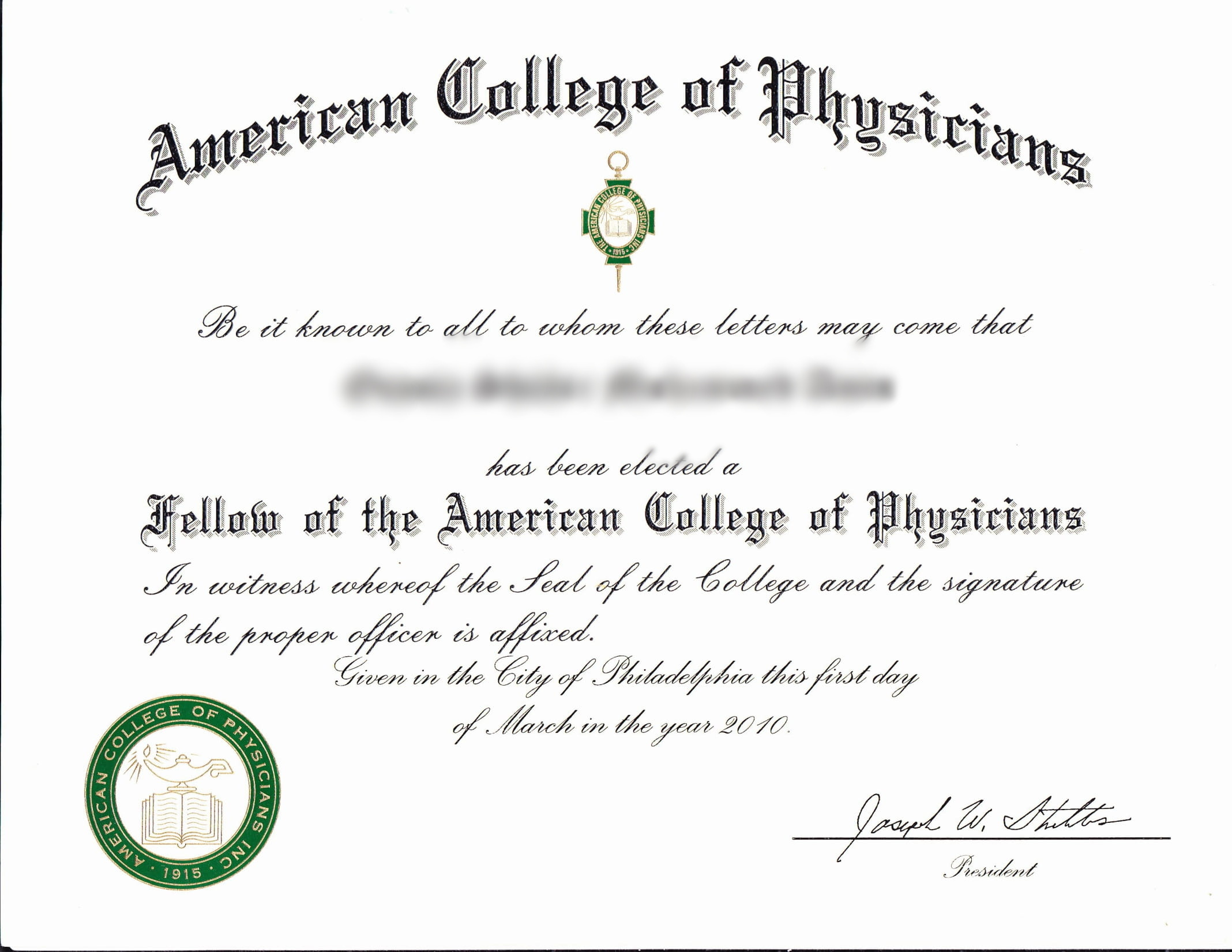
FACP, Fellowship diploma of the American College of Physicians

Levels of ACP membership are Medical Student, Associate, Member, Fellow (FACP), Honorary Fellow, and those elected to receive Mastership (MACP). Non-Physician Affiliate membership is available to licensed non-physician health care professionals who maintain their professional credentials to practice. Eligible professionals include physician assistants, nurse practitioners and other advanced practice nurses, registered nurses, pharmacists and doctors of pharmacy, and clinical psychologists.

Fellowship and election to Mastership in ACP recognize outstanding achievement in internal medicine. The distinction of FACP recognizes professional accomplishments, demonstrated scholarship and superior competence in internal medicine. Throughout the year, highly distinguished Fellows are nominated for election to Mastership by ACP members and others familiar with their backgrounds. Each fall, a select group of these Fellows are chosen from among the nominees for election to Mastership by the ACP Awards Committee and approved by the ACP Board of Regents. Individuals elected to Mastership must demonstrate excellence and significance of his or her contributions to the science and art of medicine in areas such as research, education, health care initiatives, volunteerism, and administrative positions.

== Publications ==
ACP publishes a range of publications which provide in-depth analysis of issues affecting internal medicine. They include:

- Annals of Internal Medicine, ACP's weekly peer-reviewed medical journal, is among the most widely cited peer-reviewed medical journals in the world. Annals of Internal Medicine publishes a wide variety of original research, review articles, practice guidelines, and commentary relevant to clinical practice, health care delivery, public health, health care policy, medical education, ethics, and research methodology. The most recent (2024) Impact Factor for Annals of Internal Medicine is 15.3.
- I.M. Matters from ACP, and its companion e-newsletter, I.M. Matters Weekly from ACP, provide news and information about the practice of medicine and report on the policies, products, and activities of ACP.
- ACP Hospitalist, a weekly online magazine exclusive to ACP members, covers the latest news in hospital medicine, including feature articles, Q&As, and summaries of recent research.
- Annals of Internal Medicine: Clinical Cases, ACP's and the American Heart Association's bi-monthly, open access journal presents thought-provoking case reports that spark discussion and aid in clinical decision-making. A variety of article types are considered for publication, including case reports, case series, and image and video cases.

ACP distributes several e-newsletters for its members. They include:

- ACP Advocate, a bi-weekly newsletter featuring news about public policy issues affecting internal medicine and patient care.
- ACP IMpower, a monthly newsletter offering tools, resources, and information to help ACP Resident/Fellow Members during training and prepare them for their professional futures.
- IMconnection, a monthly newsletter exclusively for early career physicians that highlights benefits and resources targeted at their career stage.
- ACP IMpact, a monthly newsletter for medical students to help explore internal medicine career opportunities and access helpful information and resources.
- I.M. a Chief Resident, a monthly newsletter offering information and resources for chief residents.
- ACP Global, a bi-monthly newsletter offering a global perspective on news in internal medicine and highlighting ACP's international activities.
- ACP Diabetes Monthly and ACP Gastroenterology Monthly, which summarize news about diabetes and gastroenterology/hepatology.

== Activities ==
ACP's Advocacy and Regulatory efforts work to improve the health care system and daily experiences for internal medicine doctors and their patients through evidence-based policy papers, grass roots activities, work with congressional leaders, key agencies, regulators, and collaborations with other organizations with similar goals. ACP advocates making regulatory and payment systems work better for internal medicine physicians, reduce burnout, and improve patient care. The organization seeks to promote policy reforms on the federal level through legislative, regulatory, and executive actions that benefit the overall health and well-being of patients, physicians, and the practice of internal medicine.

The Center for Ethics & Professionalism seeks to advance physician and public understanding of ethics and professionalism issues in the practice of medicine in order to enhance patient care by promoting the highest ethical standards. The seventh edition of the ACP Ethics Manual was published in 2019.

The organization provides several types of clinical recommendations along with Education and Information Resources.

- Clinical Practice Guidelines, which address screening, diagnosis, and treatment of diseases relevant to internal medicine and its subspecialties. They are based on a systematic review of available evidence.
- ACP received the designation of a GRADE (Grading of Recommendations Assessment, Development and Evaluation) Center in 2024, and is the first in the United States to receive it.[37] The designation recognizes the organization's work of producing high-value clinical guidelines and a formal recognition of the stringent protocols in its development of those guidelines.
- ACP works actively in the field of performance measurement in recognition of its importance in the changing health care environment and to shape its impact on Internal Medicine. The Performance Measurement Committee (PMC) oversees ACP's Performance Measures.[38][39] The PMC applies criteria to assess the validity of performance measures for healthcare. The criteria are evaluated with a modified RAND-UCLA appropriateness method to determine whether they are evidence-based, methodologically sound, and clinically meaningful.[39] ACP develops clinical policy papers and performance measurement commentaries published in scientific journals to educate ACP members about performance measurement initiatives.[39]
- Best Practice Advice, which are developed by ACP's High Value Care Task Force to address the value of diagnostic tests and therapeutic interventions for various diseases. They are based on an evaluation of the benefits, harms, and costs of a test or treatment and how this can be translated into the value of an intervention.
- Practice Points, which provide advice to improve the health of individuals and populations and promote high value care based on available evidence derived from assessment of scientific work. ACP Practice Points aim to address the value of screening and diagnostic tests and therapeutic interventions for various diseases, and consider the determinants of health, including but not limited to genetic variability, environment, and lifestyle.
- ACP MKSAP, a subscription-based, all-digital version of our comprehensive learning program. Developed by nearly 400 physician clinical editors, question writers, and peer reviewers who are active in clinical practice and expert leaders in medical education, ACP's psychometrically validated question bank uses evidence-based question-writing principles to challenge clinical reasoning and reinforce learning.
- Online Learning Center, offers ACP members hundreds of curated CME and MOC activities including journal articles, podcasts, videos, and interactive multimedia. Online Learning Center activities help you earn free CME/MOC credit and with our state-specific CME filter, members can find their own state-based CME requirements.
- Artificial Intelligence Resources Hub, curated resources around the timely topic of AI. Included on the hub are tools in medical practice, medical education, an ACP policy position paper, and other related resources.
- Adult Immunization Hub, ACP works to improve adult immunization and patient outcomes by developing clinical guidance based on available evidence, publishing weekly scientific content, advocacy and making public statements, and offering resources for physicians and patients.
- Misinformation and Disinformation Hub, ACP has resources to help communicate and deliver accurate, fact-driven health care information to patients and communities; respond to different health narratives; identify and interpret reliable information; and help communicate about evidence-based, personally appropriate health decisions.
- Dynamedex, DynaMed is collaborating with ACP to provide ACP members free access to DynaMedex—a powerful point-of-care tool that combines expert clinical content from DynaMed with comprehensive drug information from Micromedex. Dyna AI, a cutting-edge artificial intelligence search tool, DynaMedex delivers fast, expert-curated, evidence-based answers to natural language queries using content sourced exclusively from DynaMedex, including study summaries, clinical guidelines, and expert commentary to provide guidance you can trust.
- Career and Professional Development Hub, provides resources and opportunities to support your personal and professional growth and career journey, including career guidance, advancement opportunities, financial tools, and resources to prioritize well-being.
- ACP Peer Coaching Service, an evidence based coaching support service exclusively offered to ACP members, which includes coaching support for individuals and groups, along with the opportunity to become an ACP-trained Physician Peer Coach.

== See also ==
- Annals of Internal Medicine
