= Tampax =

Procter & Gamble tampon brand

- Product type: Tampon
- Current owner: Procter & Gamble
- Country: United States
- Introduced: 1931; 95 years ago (as Tampax Sales Corporation)
- Markets: World
- Previous owners: Tampax Incorporated; Tambrands, Inc.
- Website: www.tampax.com

Tampax (a portmanteau of tampon and packs) is a brand of tampons currently owned by Procter & Gamble. It was based in White Plains, New York, United States, until its sale to Procter & Gamble in 1997. It is a subsidiary of P&G's Always brand and is sold in over 100 countries.

The product was designed by Earle Haas, who filed a patent in the 1930s. The original product was designed from the start as flushable and biodegradable.

== History ==
In 1937, Tampax worked with McCann Erickson for its marketing campaigns. In 1949, the brand appeared in more than 50 stores. From 1930s to 1940s Tampax chose sportswomen as their brand ambassadors.

Tampax conducted medical studies in 1945 to prove the safety of tampons.

Courteney Cox appeared in a 1985 Tampax ad notable for making her the first person to use the word "period" in an American television commercial.

Marketing for the product includes the company's BeingGirl website.

Tampax was an independent company based in Palmer, Massachusetts and headquartered in New York City for over 50 years. Renamed Tambrands, Inc. in 1984, the company was purchased by Procter & Gamble in 1997. Tampax is available in over 100 countries; there is no distribution in Germany and Austria.
