= Linda Prine =

American physician and writer

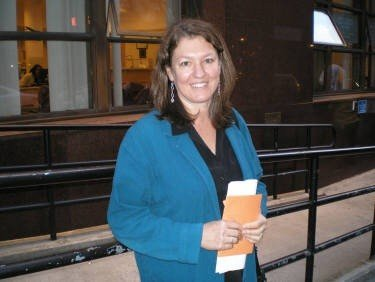
- Prine in front of The Institute For Family Health in Manhattan.
- Born: Linda Prine; Pittsburgh, United States
- Education: Cornell University University of Wisconsin-Madison
- Occupations: family physician, writer/author, professor, consultant, cyclist, non-profits founder, activist, residency teacher, fellowship director, academy chair, health care director

Linda Prine is a family physician, professor, and non-profit founder. She held many leadership positions in the New York State Academy of Family Physicians and was the Women’s Health Director at a large FQHC (Federally Qualified Healthcare Center) in New York. In 2000 she co-founded the Reproductive Health Access Project. She remains the fellowship director of the Reproductive Health Access Project fellowship, and residency teacher at the Harlem and Mount Sinai Downtown Family Medicine residencies. In 2019 she co-founded the Miscarriage and Abortion Hotline where she still volunteers.

Prine has been active in Transportation Alternatives, advocating for bicycling infrastructure in New York City and in Physicians for a National Health Program, advocating for Single Payer health care reform. She currently works as co-medical director for the Abortion Coalition for Telemedicine (ACT), an organization that she co-founded to help pass the New York State Shield law which protects clinicians licensed in New York state so that they can provide telemedicine abortions to people in all 50 states and territories of the US. ACT now focuses on helping shield law providers start up and practice using the laws of their state, while addressing regulatory, legal, financial and malpractice barriers to providing abortion. She also provides telemedicine abortion with Aid Access. Prine promotes making abortion part of family health care.

== Career ==
Prine holds a large number of the top positions in her field, including:

- The chair of the New York County chapter of the New York State Academy of Family Physicians
- The director of Women's Health at New York City’s Institute for Family Health
- The founder and medical director of the Reproductive Health Access Project (RHAP) and the leader of the RHAP’s’s Family Medicine Reproductive Health Network
- The founder of the National Abortion Training and Access LISTSERV
- The director of the IFH and RHAP’s Fellowship in Reproductive Health Care and Advocacy
- The medical director of Whole Woman’s Health, Las Cruces, New Mexico
- Professor of family medicine at Icahn School of Medicine at Mount Sinai in New York City
- Co-chair of the American Academy of Family Physicians’ Member Interest Group on Reproductive Health Care
- Advisory council member of Transportation Alternatives
- Board member of Physicians for a National Health Program-NY Metro Chapter
- Faculty at the Beth Israel/Mount Sinai and the Harlem Family Medicine residencies
- An associate professor of family medicine at Albert Einstein College of Medicine in the Bronx
- An advisor at the Society of Teachers of Family Medicine's Group on Abortion Training and Access.
- A consultant for the Center for Reproductive Health Education in Family Medicine at Montefiore Medical Center.
- A teacher at Planned Parenthood, where she has worked in a variety of positions for decades.

Prine's work has been published in dozens of journals including American Family Physician and American Journal of Public Health. She has been profiled and featured in dozens of publications, including the front page of The New York Times and in Scientific American,CNN, ABC News, BuzzFeed, the blog Jezebel and the Women's Media Center.

Prine presents her work at national conferences, grand rounds, and workshops across America.

Prine is also at the forefront of several bicycle activism movements, serving as the chief medical representative for the Transportation Alternatives advisory board and authoring letters to the Mayor of New York City, representing hundreds of doctors at the New York State Academy of Family Physicians. She has written for The New York Daily News in support for more bike lanes and testified for New York City Council in support of tackling obesity with more and better bike lanes. Prine is a cyclist herself, finishing all 100 miles of the New York's City Century bike race several times.

== Contributions to family medicine ==
=== Major articles ===
==== Abortion Family Practice Safety Study ====
Linda Prine was the lead author of a 2001–02 study on medical abortion's safety in family practices. The study was the first-ever to focus on the outcomes of medical abortion in a family practice setting. It concluded that provision of medical abortion by family physicians is safe, effective, and feasible. The study, first published in the Journal of the American Board of Family Practice, was considered groundbreaking and subsequently feature in several prestigious publications including Medscape Medical. The conclusion that medical abortion has similar efficacy and patient satisfaction when offered in a family medicine practice or at a reproductive health specialty clinic reassured family physicians that medical abortion can be offered safely in their practices. The study was praised nationwide and cited in several subsequent articles on the same topic.

==== Study on integrating medical abortion into residency practices ====
Linda Prine was the lead author of a 2003 article published by Beth Israel's Residency Program in Urban Family Practice, titled ""Integrating medical abortion into a residency practice." The article detailed the most successful methods of integrating medical abortion into a residency practice, using the results of a study that involved the surveying of staff, faculty, residents and colleagues and different ways in which these concerns were addressed. The work was praised as insightful and thorough research that made a significant impact on the future integration of medical abortion into residency practicies. The article was cited in over a dozen future articles on similar topics.

==== "Hospital Religious Affiliation and Emergency Contraceptive Prescribing Practices" ====
Linda Prine was the co-author in a 2006 study titled "Hospital Religious Affiliation and Emergency Contraceptive Prescribing Practices." In the study's results, within 7 out of the 9 clinical scenarios, clinicians from non–religiously affiliated institutions would prescribe Emergency Contraception more readily than those in religiously affiliated institutions. The article was published in the American Journal of Public Health and cited in numerous publications including Canadian Family Physician.

===== Other notable contributions =====
- Co-author, "Initiating Hormonal Contraception", published in American Family Physician, 2006.
- Co-author, "Letter to the Editor, Re: Safety of and Contraindications for Use of Intrauterine Devices", published in Association of Family Physicians, 2005.
- Co-author, "Letter to the Editor, Re: Papaya: A Simulation Model for Training in Uterine Aspiration, published in Family Medicine, 2005.
- Co-author, "Letter to the Editor: Does Abortion Training Affect Family Medicine Match Rates?", published in Family Medicine, 2003.

== Reproductive rights work ==
=== Activism ===
==== Medical abortion and the rise of activism in medicine ====
Linda Prine was the co-author in an article titled "Medical abortion and activism in medicine," published in the textbook "21st Century Sexualities: Contemporary Issues in Health, Education, and Rights." The article highlights how the 2000 FDA approval of mifepristone opened the doors for a new age of reproductive rights activism, growing among physicians and medical students in which family physicians are being trained to become abortion providers.

=== Reproductive Health Access Project ===
Linda Prine is one of the founders of the Reproductive Health Access Project (RHAP). Through advocacy programs, training programs, and mentoring programs, RHAP assists family physicians and other clinicians in integrating birth control and abortion into routine medical care.

The central goal of RHAP is to work towards a future in which American women and teenagers at every socioeconomic level are provided with birth control and abortion from their primary care physician.

== Awards ==
=== 2018 Society of Teachers of Family Medicine Excellence in Education Award ===
The Society of Teachers of Family Medicine Award for Excellence in Education is given to individuals who have demonstrated excellence in teaching, curriculum development, mentoring, research, or leadership in education at regional or national levels.

=== 2016 Society of Family Planning Hatcher Mentor Award ===
The Society of Family Planning Hatcher Mentor Award is awarded to individuals who have demonstrated dedication to supporting and furthering the careers of a new generation of academic clinicians or scholars in the field of family planning.

=== 2014 New York State Academy of Family Physicians Educator of the Year ===
The Family Practice Educator of the Year Award was created in 1991 to recognize those who have made major contributions to education for family practice in undergraduate, graduate and continuing education spheres. In a press release from the New York State Academy of Family Physicians, it was announced that Linda Prine was the winner of the 2014 Educator of the Year award. The June 6th, 2014 release read, "Dr. Linda Prine is a nationally recognized leader and educator in reproductive health."

=== 2012 Rashbaum Abortion Provider Award ===
Each year Physician's for Reproductive Choice and Health honors a reproductive health care physician who provides outstanding abortion services. According to their website the "William K. Rashbaum, MD, Abortion Provider Award honors a physician who provides outstanding abortion services and serves as an inspirational leader for colleagues, residents, and medical students. Rashbaum (1926-2005) was a cofounder of PRCH, a gifted obstetrician and gynecologist, a respected teacher, and a passionate advocate for women’s rights."

=== Leadership for a Changing World Award ===
Linda Prine was a runner up for the award "Leadership for a Changing World" in 2005. The award recognizes and supports community leaders across America who are effectively tackling tough social issues.

=== Beth Israel Teacher of the Year Award ===
Linda Prine won the Teacher of the Year award at her Beth Israel Family Medicine Residency. She was voted best teacher by her residents.
