= Center for the History of Family Medicine =

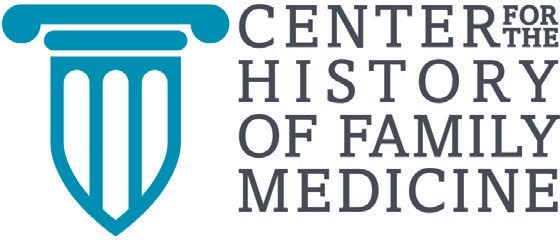

The Center for the History of Family Medicine (CHFM) is a historical research center which is part of the non-profit American Academy of Family Physicians Foundation (AAFP Foundation), a non-profit, charitable 501(c)(3) organization located in Leawood, Kansas. The CHFM serves as the primary repository of information and resources on the history and evolution of general practice, family practice, the discipline of family medicine and the family medicine organizations within the United States. Its mission is to document, organize and preserve organizational records, personal papers, books and artifacts in all formats and disseminate information about them in both printed and electronic form. It also serves as an informational link to all other family medicine organizations and to all who are interested in the history of the specialty.

== History and background ==
The first move to begin an historical center within the specialty of family medicine came in 1987, when Claudene Clinton, then Director of the Division of Research and Information Services for the American Academy of Family Physicians (AAFP), suggested the need for the establishment of a repository within the AAFP to house the growing body of material relating to the founding, growth and development of the academy and of the specialty of family medicine. At its meeting in February of that year, the board of directors of the academy moved to establish “a task force on the history of the American Academy of Family Physicians to determine the best way to preserve materials and documents related to the growth of the specialty.” A consultant was obtained, and after lengthy study in which detailed space, equipment and budgetary requirements were determined, the board of directors approved the establishment of an “AAFP Archives” within the Academy. Following her retirement as Director of the Division of Research and Information Services, Ms. Clinton served as the first Archivist for the archives (later renamed “the Archives for Family Practice”) on a contract basis with the academy.

On January 1, 1992, administrative responsibility for the archives was transferred from the academy to the AAFP Foundation. Following its transfer to the foundation, a board of curators was created to serve in an advisory capacity to the foundation’s board of trustees on the operations of the Archives. Initially the Board was made up of 7 members (now 15) “who have made significant contributions to family practice; who possess a broad perspective of the discipline; who have a strong interest in its historical development; and who are familiar with all the organizations in the discipline.” In 1998, an endowment was also created for the center, to help realize the Board of Curator’s vision of a “self-sustaining and self-supporting” entity operating within the foundation.

By 2003, the Archives for Family Practice had evolved into the principal resource center for the collection, conservation, exhibition and study of materials relating to the history of family medicine. Besides the academy and the foundation, other family medicine organizations that contribute by placing their records into its holdings, donating to its endowment and having their members serve on its advisory board include the American Board of Family Medicine (ABFM); the Association of Departments of Family Medicine (ADFM); the Association of Family Medicine Residency Directors (AFMRD); the North American Primary Care Research Group (NAPCRG); and the Society of Teachers of Family Medicine (STFM). The collections had also evolved, growing into four separate and distinct areas:

1. a corporate, or organizational archives for the holdings of the seven family medicine organizations;
2. manuscript collections of prominent family physicians and family medicine educators and staff;
3. an historical research library containing books written by and about family physicians and reference materials on family medicine; and
4. a museum collection of medical artifacts relating to the specialty for exhibition.

This rapid expansion of the Archives for Family Practice’s collections, coupled with some confusion generated by its name (which was similar to several medicine journals bearing the title “Archives”), gave rise to the need for a name change for the archives. Consequently, in November 2003, the Board of Curators and the AAFP/F Board of Trustees approved a new name for the facility, and on January 1, 2004, the Archives for Family Practice became the Center for the History of Family Medicine.

The Center for the History of Family Medicine is the only institution dedicated exclusively to preserving and sharing the history of family medicine in the United States. It serves to document all aspects of the profession in all of its spheres, including education, leadership development, advocacy, and in the continuing care of patients from birth to death.

== Collections, programs and exhibits ==
An interdisciplinary study center consisting of an historical research library, archives and museum center, the CHFM actively documents, collects, organizes, preserves and exhibits organizational records, personal papers, books, artifacts and other materials in all formats relating to the history of general practice, family practice and family medicine in America. The Center’s programs include an active acquisitions and oral history program in which personal and professional papers and oral histories are collected from prominent leaders in the specialty, and a traveling exhibit program. Reference services are also provided.
