= Reproductive Health Access Project =

Reproductive Health Access Project, Inc.
- Abbreviation: RHAP
- Formation: 2005
- Type: 501c(3)
- Purpose: Reproductive Health
- Headquarters: Manhattan, New York City, New York, U.S.
- Region served: United States
- Website: reproductiveaccess.org

The Reproductive Health Access Project, Inc. (RHAP) is a nonprofit organization that seeks to integrate abortion, contraception, and miscarriage care into mainstream medicine. It is well known for its network that organizes over 3,500 primary clinicians into local groups called "clusters" which work to include reproductive health care in primary care practice, and for its fellowship and hands-on clinical training programs.

== Activities ==
The organization has garnered press coverage for its papaya workshops, where a papaya (resembling a uterus) is instrumented with a manual vacuum aspirator, a syringe-like device commonly used in abortion procedures. The organization was the subject of an NPR story after it led a petition campaign to ensure that contraception and abortion remain part of the core curriculum in family medicine training. RHAP's resources and materials on contraception, abortion and miscarriage have been translated into several languages. The organization also publishes in academic journals such as Contraception and American Family Physician.

== History ==
RHAP was founded in 2005 by Linda Prine, Lisa Maldonado and Ruth Lesnewski. Linda Prine is a practicing family physician affiliated with Mount Sinai in New York, and is certified by the American Board of Family Medicine; she is RHAP's medical director. Lisa Maldonado is currently RHAP's executive director and previously worked with family planning programs in Latin America, Africa, and New York City. Ruth Lesnewski is currently an attending physician at the Mount Sinai Downtown Family Medicine Residency Program in Urban Family Practice; she is also RHAP's educational director.
