= Advanced Life Support in Obstetrics =

Training program for physicians

General information
- Names: Advanced Life Support in Obstetrics
- Abbreviation: ALSO
- Field: Medicine
- Specialty: Obstetrics, Family Medicine

History
- Inventor: Damos and Beasley
- Invention date: 1991

Description
- Organizer: American Academy of Family Physicians
- Participants: Physicians, certified nurse midwives (CNM), registered nurses, and other health care providers
- Duration: 2 days

Advanced Life Support in Obstetrics (ALSO) is a program that was developed by the American Academy of Family Physicians (AAFP). This course helps physicians, certified nurse midwives (CNM), registered nurses, and other health care providers involved in potential emergencies in the perinatal care of mothers. This course is important and even required in some hospitals for family practice physicians as well as a learning tool in most family practice residency programs. ALSO was developed by Damos and Beasley, from the Department of Family Medicine at the University of Wisconsin.

ALSO aims to decrease morbidity and mortality for both the mother and baby. ALSO does this by incorporating both didactic and practical hands on workstations with lifelike mannequins. Topics include assisted vaginal delivery, Doppler fetal monitoring, fetal dystocias, neonatal resuscitation, management premature labor, management of postpartum hemorrhage, along with forceps and vacuum-assisted delivery. Participants must pass a written test as well as a practical hands-on case management of a birth (mega-delivery) incorporating many elements learned throughout the course.

ALSO helps serve the same function as advanced trauma life support (ATLS) and advanced cardiac life support (ACLS) to help keep physicians who work with rural or underserved populations up to date on evidence-based medicine and curriculum.

Although Canadian family physicians historically followed the ALSO course, the College of Family Physicians of Canada has also developed a similar program entitled Advanced Labour and Risk Management (ALARM), which serves the same purpose as the AAFP's ALSO.
