= North American Primary Care Research Group =

The North American Primary Care Research Group (NAPCRG) is an organization of researchers in family medicine, primary care, and related fields, including epidemiology, the behavioral sciences, and health services research. NAPCRG was founded in 1972 and has binational (USA and Canada) governance.

== Programs ==
NAPCRG maintains programs that are focused on building research capacity in primary care, generating grants, supporting patient-centered outcomes in research, and involving trainees in primary care research.

== Conferences ==
NAPCRG organizes an annual meeting, a practice-based research network conference, and an international conference on practice facilitation.

== Affiliations ==
- American Academy of Family Physicians (AAFP)
- American Board of Family Medicine (ABFM)
- College of Family Physicians of Canada (CPFC)
- Society of Teachers of Family Medicine (STFM)
