= Paul Caulford =

Canadian Doctor, activist and academic

- Occupation: Family physician
- Organization: Canadian Centre for Refugee and Immigrant Health Care
- Known for: Access to healthcare advocacy

Paul Caulford is a Canadian advocate, academic, and family doctor in Scarborough, Toronto who provides free healthcare to refugees, undocumented migrants and other newcomers who are unable to get healthcare through the formal channels.

He was the chief of family medicine and was the community services director at Scarborough Hospital when the SARS epidemic hit Canada hardest in 2003 and he co-founded the Canadian Centre for Refugee and Immigrant Health Care.

Caulford publishes academic papers and advocates for immigrants and refugees to have full access to the Canadian healthcare system.

== Education ==
Caulford obtained a bachelor's degree of science in 1972, a Master of Science in 1975 and a degree in medicine in 1978 all from the University of Toronto.

He while studying, he also spent his summers learning with a pathology professor at The Hospital for Sick Children.

== Career ==
=== Academia ===
Caulford is an assistant professor at the University of Toronto's department of family and community medicine.

=== Scarborough Hospital ===
Caulford worked as the chief of family medicine and was the community services director at Scarborough Hospital during the SARS epidemic in 2003. His analysis of the state of Canada's healthcare system and his critique of mankind's treatment of planet earth are quoted in page one of the 2022 book Turkey and the Post-Pandemic World Order. He points out how the healthcare systems both in Canada and internationally were incapable of responding to the pandemic and called for investments to create more robust systems.

=== Canadian Centre for Refugee and Immigrant Health Care ===
In 2000, Caulford and nurses Jennifer D’Andrade and Cathy Tersigni co-founded the Community Volunteer Clinic in Scarborough, Ontario after discovering that despite Canada's claim of a universal public healthcare system, thousands of refugee claimants and undocumented forced migrants were being denied access to public healthcare insurance. Staffed with volunteer nurses, doctors and community members, and dedicated to the care of uninsured refugees and migrants, the Clinic was first of its kind in Canada. Renamed The Canadian Centre for Refugee and Immigrant Health Care Canadian Centre for Refugee and Immigrant Health Care (CCRIHC), which is located in a converted church at 4158 Sheppard Avenue East. By early 2021, CCRIH treated patients 40,000 times. The clinic provides free healthcare to immigrants and refugees who would otherwise be without access to healthcare five days and two evenings a week.

In 2013 shortly after Canada's Federal Conservative government slashed Interim Federal Health Care to refugees in Canada Caulford set to work documenting the harm this caused. http://refugeediaries.ca/. In 2014 a federal court challenge launched by Canadian Doctors for Refugee Care and others http://www.doctorsforrefugeecare.ca/ resulted in the reversal of the cuts. https://www.toronto.com/content/tncms/live/. Nineteen cases cited and entered as evidence documenting the harm were refugee patients attending The Canadian Centre for Refugee and Immigrant Health Care. http://refugeediaries.ca/.

In October 2015, leading up to the federal election the Liberal Party convened a community roundtable at The Canadian Centre for Refugee and Immigrant Health Care in Scarborough. https://liberal.ca/liberal-candidates-offering-leadership-on-syrian-refugee-crisis/. The input from the roundtable contributed to the first arrival of Syrian refugees. Volunteer nurses and doctors from CCRIHC opened an on site refugee clinic at the COSTI settlement centre to provide medical care to the arriving Syrians. https://temertymedicine.utoronto.ca/news/caring-uninsured-paul-caulford-bsc72-msc75-md78

In 2017, Caulford treated an increasing number of women and children arriving in the back of trucks arriving in Canada via USA. He treated frostbite, mental health conditions, malnutrition, respiratory problems, and provided reproductive health services.

During the COVID-19 pandemic, Caulford provided family medicine services online and face-to-face in a tent. In April 2020 he called for more nurses and doctors to support the tent clinic.

=== Advocacy ===
In 2012, Caulford called for the Federal Government of Canada to provider better healthcare for refugees and simpler administration procedures to encourage doctors to register in the government's refugee health funding program.

He criticized Donald Trump's immigration policies in 2017, and in 2019 he advocated against the deportation of a family from Canada.

In January 2020, Caulford spoke of the need for COVID-19 vaccines to be provided outside of normal working hours. Later in 2020, he launched a successful advocacy campaign to persuade the Federal Government of Canada and the Government of Ontario to provide hospital care to people without documentation.

In 2021, Caulford spoke about how many poor people have moved away from the centre of Toronto to Scarborough.

=== Scarborough Women Assessment and Need ===
Caulford runs the Scarborough Women Assessment and Need program that provides counselling and reproductive health care to vulnerable women in Scarborough.

=== Filling the Gap Dental Outreach ===
In 2006 Caulford co-founded a free, one room dental clinic in Scarborough with Dr Hazel Stewart, Chief Dental Officer with the City of Toronto https://toronto.citynews.ca/2007/02/22/should-the-poor-get-free-dental-care/ . The clinic serves working impoverished Canadians and refugees and migrants new to Canada. In 2015 Dr. Amanda Morel (dentist) and Caulford expanded the dental clinic with public donations into a modern community dental clinic. Filling the Gap Dental Outreach provides free dental services to people on low incomes at CCRIHC.

== Selected publications ==
- Paul Caulford and Yasmin Vali, Providing health care to medically uninsured immigrants and refugees, CMAJ April 25, 2006 174 (9) 1253–1254; DOI: https://doi.org/10.1503/cmaj.051206
- Paul Caulford, MD. SARS: Aftermath of an outbreak. THE LANCET SUPPLEMENT| VOLUME 362, SPECIAL ISSUE, S2-S3, DECEMBER 2003, Published:December, 2003DOI:https://doi.org/10.1016/S0140-6736(03)15052-0
- Paul Caulford, 2003. The Guardian, Tue 29 Apr 2003 'Welcome to Sars central' https://www.theguardian.com/society/2003/apr/29/sars.lifeandhealth
- Paul Caulford, Gar Bloch, & Ritika Goel, Waiting for care: Effect of Ontario's 3-month waiting period for OHIP on landed immigrants, 2013, Canadian Family Physician, 59(6)
- Paul Caulford & J D'Andrade, Health care for Canada's medically uninsured immigrants and refugees: Whose problem is it?, 2012, Canadian Family Physician, 58(7) p725-727
- Norman GR, Davis DA, Lamb S, Hanna E, Caulford P, Kaigas T. Competency Assessment of Primary Care Physicians as Part of a Peer Review Program. JAMA. 1993;270(9):1046–1051. doi:10.1001/jama.1993.03510090030007

== Awards ==
Caulford, and his team at the Canadian Centre for Refugee and Immigrant Health Care, received the Public Health Champion Award in 2008. Also in 2008 Caulford received the Government of Ontario's Newcomer Champion Award.

In 2010 Caulford was honoured with the Scarborough Urban Heroes award for his efforts to bring medical and dental care to medically uninsured and underinsured refugees, asylum seekers and forcibly displaced migrants. https://www.toronto.com/content/tncms/live/

In 2016 Caulford accepted the Rotary District 7070 Wilf Wilkinson International Peace Award on behalf of The Canadian Centre for Refugee and Immigrant Health Care. https://www.globenewswire.com/news-release/2016/09/26/1327935/0/en/The-Canadian-Centre-for-Refugee-and-Immigrant-Health-Care-Receives-the-2016-ROTARY-DISTRICT-7070-Wilf-Wilkinson-Peace-Award.html

Caulford received the Ontario College of Family Physicians Regional Family Physician of the Year Award in 2017.

He was one of five physicians recognized by Toronto Life for his inspiring work in 2020.

Caulford was inducted into the Scarborough Walk of Fame and received his Star in 2022 in recognition of his contributions during the 2003 SARS Crisis in Toronto and for providing health equity to medically uninsured refugees and undocumented newcomers in Canada.

== See also ==
- Refugee health care in Canada
- Ontario Health Insurance Plan
- [[Refugee Diaries Canada. ]]
