= OCFP =

OCFP may refer to:

- Olympiacos CFP in Piraeus, Greece
- Ontario College of Family Physicians
- Oregon-Canadian Forest Products
