= Joseph E. Scherger =

American family practice physician, public health professional, and academic

- Education: MD, MPH
- Occupations: Family practice physician, clinical professor, public health professional
- Years active: 2002-present
- Employer: Restore Health
- Known for: Thought leadership in the family practice medical specialty
- Title: Medical Director
- Movement: Wellness

Joseph E. Scherger is an American physician and public health professional who has served as a medical school clinical faculty member, and as a longstanding practitioner and thought leader in the medical specialty of family practice, with more than 50 publications in that area. As of this date, he was a medical director at Restore Health in Indian Wells, California.

== Biography ==
Joseph E. Scherger earned two professional degrees, an M.D., and an M.P.H..

His clinical academic appointments have included positions at the School of Medicine, Florida State University and University of California, Davis. A longstanding, earlier family practice affiliation from which he regularly published was Eisenhower Health Center, in Rancho Mirage, California. As of 2006, he was serving as a family practice physician at UCSD Medical Center.

Scherger has published more than 50 journal medical journal pieces, some in medical economics, but most related directly to the practice of family medicine and the training of its practitioners, including in the Journal of Family Practice, Journal of the American Board of Family Medicine, Family Practice Management, Family Medicine, as well as Medical Economics, the BMJ (British Medical Journal), Drug and Therapy Perspectives, and others.

As of this date, he was the medical director of Restore Health, a "disease reversal"-aimed practice in Indian Wells, California, where is main foci were nutrition and other areas of wellness.

== Personal life ==
Scherger was an avid runner, as of this date, having completed more than 40 marathons, and more than a dozen 30- to 50-mile (50- to 80-kilometer) ultramarathon trail runs.
