= Ear candling =

Alternative medicine practice for ear cleaning

Ear candling, also called ear coning or thermal-auricular therapy, is a pseudoscientific alternative medicine practice claiming to improve general health and well-being by lighting one end of a hollow candle and placing the other end in the ear canal. Medical research has shown that the practice is both dangerous and ineffective and does not functionally remove earwax or toxicants, despite product design contributing to that impression.

== Technique ==
Medical News Today describes the process of ear candling:

Ear candles are typically about 10 inches long, hollow, and tapered. A person lights them at their widest end. They are usually made of fabric soaked in wax or a mixture of substances, often paraffin and beeswax. To perform ear candling, a person will lie on their side and insert a candle into the ear. Usually, a square or circle made of paper, tin foil, or plastic acts as a cover to prevent hot wax from dripping onto the face, neck, or hair. Once the candle and covering are secure, a person will light the candle for 10–20 minutes. Wax does not go into the ear during this process. Ear candle makers and supporters claim that the lit candle creates enough warmth to generate suction. This suction pulls impurities and wax out of the ear canal.

== Safety and effectiveness ==
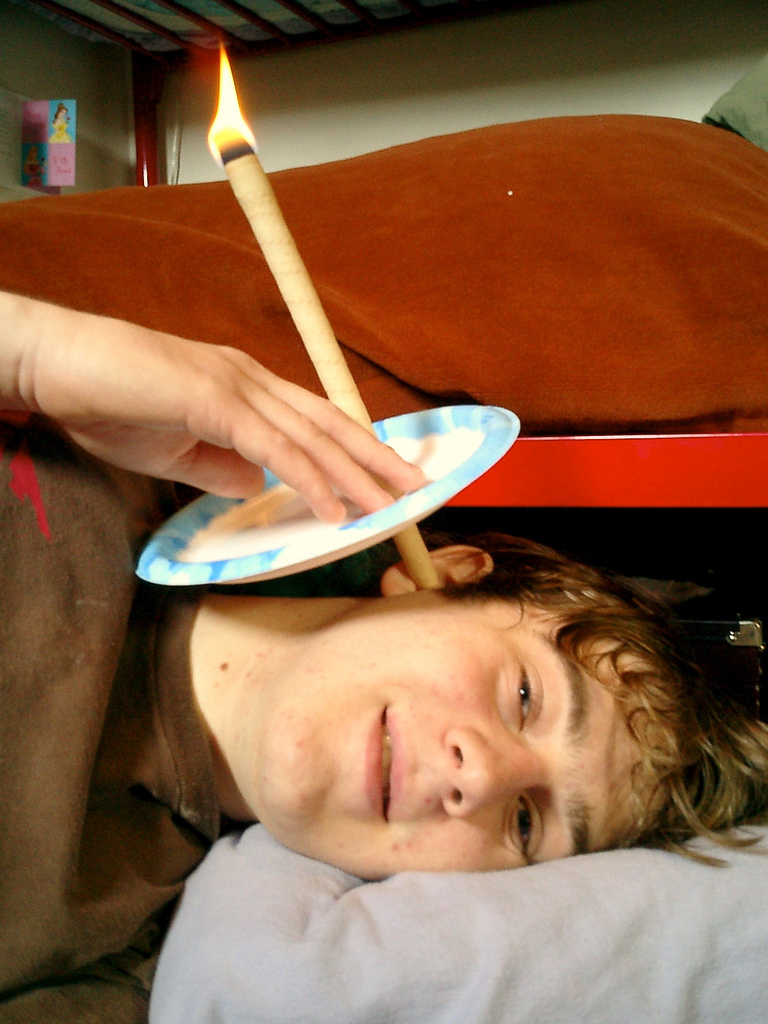
An ear candling session in progress

Professor of Complementary Medicine Edzard Ernst wrote about ear candles: "There is no data to suggest that it is effective for any condition. Furthermore, ear candles have been associated with ear injuries. The inescapable conclusion is that ear candles do more harm than good. Their use should be discouraged."

According to the US Food and Drug Administration (FDA), ear candling is sometimes promoted with claims that the practice can "purify the blood" or "cure" cancer. Health Canada has determined the candles do not affect the ear, and provide no health benefit; instead, they create a risk of injury, especially when used on children. In October 2007, US FDA issued an alert identifying ear candles (also known as ear cones or auricular candles) as "dangerous to health when used in the dosage or manner, or with the frequency or duration, prescribed, recommended, or suggested in the labeling thereof ... since the use of a lit candle in the proximity of a person's face would carry a high risk of causing potentially severe skin/hair burns and middle ear damage."

A 2007 paper in the journal Canadian Family Physician concludes:

Ear candling appears to be popular and is heavily advertised with claims that could seem scientific to lay people. However, its claimed mechanism of action has not been verified, no positive clinical effect has been reliably recorded, and it is associated with considerable risk. No evidence suggests that ear candling is an effective treatment for any condition. On this basis, we believe it can do more harm than good and we recommend that GPs discourage its use.

A 2007 article in American Family Physician said ear candling should be avoided, stating:

In theory, the combination of heat and suction is supposed to remove earwax. However, in one trial, ear candles neither created suction nor removed wax and actually led to occlusion with candle wax in persons who previously had clean ear canals. Primary care physicians may see complications from ear candling including candle wax occlusion, local burns, and tympanic membrane perforation.

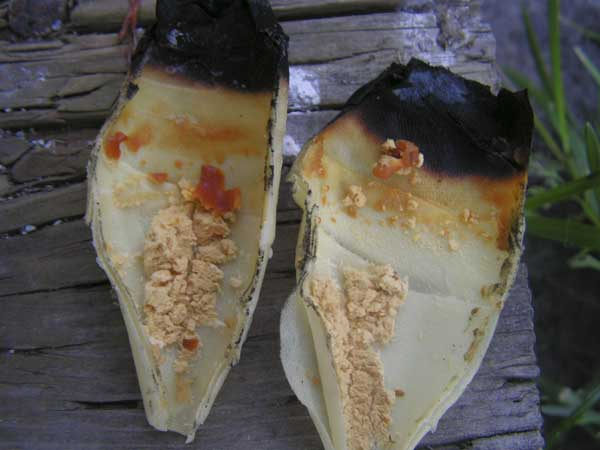
Material appearing after ear candling is actually residue from the candle itself.

The Spokane Ear, Nose, and Throat Clinic conducted a research study in 1996, which concluded that ear candling does not produce negative pressure and is ineffective in removing wax from the ear canal. Several studies have shown that ear candles produce the same residue – which is simply candle wax and soot – when burnt without ear insertion.

At least two house fires (one fatal) have been caused by accidents during ear candling.

A survey of ear, nose and throat surgeons found some who had treated people with complications from ear candling, and that burns were the most common.

== Product regulations ==
In Europe, some ear candles bear the CE mark (93/42/EEC), though they are mostly self-issued by the manufacturer. This mark indicates that the device is designed and manufactured so as not to compromise the safety of patients, but no independent testing is required as proof.

While ear candles are widely available in the US, selling or importing them with medical claims is illegal.

In a report, Health Canada states "There is no scientific proof to support claims that ear candling provides medical benefits. ... However, there is plenty of proof that ear candling is dangerous". It says that while some people claim to be selling the candles "for entertainment purposes only", the Canadian government maintains that there is no reasonable non-medical use, and hence any sale of the devices is illegal in Canada.

== Origin ==
Ear candle manufacturer Biosun referred to them as "Hopi" ear candles, but there is no such treatment within traditional Hopi healing practices. Vanessa Charles, public relations officer for the Hopi Tribal Council, has stated that ear candling "is not and has never been a practice conducted by the Hopi tribe or the Hopi people." The Hopi tribe has repeatedly asked Biosun to stop using the Hopi name. Biosun ignored the request for over a decade until sometime after 2014 when the product was rebranded as "traditional earcandles" in Germany, although the product is still marketed by third-party US resellers as "Hopi".

Many advocates of ear candles claim that the treatment originates from traditional Chinese, Egyptian, or North American medicine. The mythical city of Atlantis is also reported to be the origin of this practice, which has no documentation. The earliest records state that it was first practiced by Americans in the 20th century from some European immigrants. It developed largely in Arizona.

== See also ==
- Ear pick
- List of ineffective cancer treatments
