= Stefan Grzybowski =

Stefan Grzybowski, FCFPC, is Canadian obstetrician and researcher in rural medicine. He is a professor of obstetrics at UBC Faculty of Medicine in British Columbia and a co-director of the Centre for Rural Health Research and director of the Rural Health Services Research Network of British Columbia.

== Early life and education ==
Grzybowski was born into a physician family; his father was a physician and clinical researcher, and his mother an obstetrician. He earned his medical degree from the University of British Columbia and his Master's of Clinical Science from the University of Western Ontario.

== Career ==
Grzybowski began his career as a family physician in Queen Charlotte on the Haida Gwaii islands of British Columbia, where he began to study safety issues in birthing and more broadly, medical outcomes in rural populations. After twelve years he moved to Vancouver, where he worked at Three Bridges Health Centre from 1994 to 2006; while there he co-published a study of street prices for opioids, one of the earliest studies of pricing for resold prescription drugs. As of January 2020 he is a professor in the Department of Family Practice at UBC Faculty of Medicine, co-director of the Centre for Rural Health Research, and director of the Rural Health Services Research Network of British Columbia while occasionally continuing to practise as a locum in British Columbia and the Northwest Territories.

== Honors ==
The Foundation for Advancing Family Medicine of the College of Family Physicians of Canada honored Grzybowski as a Family Physician of the Year (2002) and Family Medicine Researcher of the Year (2009), and in 2019 gave him a Lifetime Achievement in Family Medicine Research Award.
