= Guys We Fucked =

Comedy podcast

- Genre: Comedy, interview
- Language: English

Cast and voices
- Hosted by: Corinne Fisher, Krystyna Hutchinson

Publication
- Original release: December 2013

Related
- Website: sorryaboutlastnightcomedy.com

Guys We Fucked is a weekly podcast hosted by New York–based comedians Corinne Fisher and Krystyna Hutchinson, collectively known as the comedy duo Sorry About Last Night.

Described as an "anti-slut-shaming" podcast by the show's hosts, Guys We Fucked (GWF) deals with issues around sex-positivity and politics and features frank and open conversations with comedians, actors, musicians, sex workers, sexual health professionals and activists.

GWF was touted as one of "22 Podcasts That You Should Be Subscribing To In 2016" by BuzzFeed News and one of the "15 Best Sex Podcasts" by Esquire in 2019.

== History ==
GWF podcast creators and hosts, Corinne Fisher and Krystyna Hutchinson, first met in New York City when Hutchinson became an intern at a talent management company where Fisher worked as a talent manager's assistant. Prior to moving to New York, Hutchinson lived in Pennsylvania, while Fisher grew up in New Jersey.

In 2010, Hutchinson landed an internship at Saturday Night Live and a writer for the show suggested that if Hutchinson wanted to eventually perform on SNL she should try stand-up comedy. Hutchinson invited Fisher to her first stand-up set; Fisher was already performing stand-up comedy at the time. Consequently, Fisher asked Hutchinson if she would be interested in working on a comedy act and later that year they launched a live comedy show called Sorry About Last Night, a name they would also adopt for their comedy duo. During the Sorry About Last Night shows, the hosts would invite an audience member onstage to tell a story about how someone did them wrong, with the requirement that the audience member had this other person's phone number. After telling the story, the hosts and guest would prank call that person.

In 2013, Fisher had what she described to Mother Jones as a "nervous breakdown" after an unexpected breakup with a man she had hoped to marry. Fisher sought Hutchinson for solace and got the idea to have a show where she could interview her ex-boyfriends and lovers to find out where things went wrong, similar to John Cusack's character in the 2000 film High Fidelity. In December of that year the duo launched the GWF podcast.

What started as a forum for Fisher and Hutchinson to interview their former sex partners, later evolved into a show featuring a variety of guests, including sex columnist Dan Savage, The Daily Show co-creator Lizz Winstead, model and actress Amber Rose, former president of the American Civil Liberties Union Nadine Strossen, and pornographic actor Stoya. From 2014 to 2015 Fisher and Hutchinson also hosted a web series on YouTube called Girls On Girls, where they would recap and comment on episodes of the comedy-drama television series Girls.

In 2016, the comedy duo embarked on Guys We Fucked: Live Experience an interactive comedy tour of several cities across both the United States and Canada. The GWF tour included two shows at the Just for Laughs comedy festival in Montreal and where they managed to sell the most tickets out of any other performer at the festival that year. Guests included fellow comedians Ms. Pat and Big Jay Oakerson.

The GWF live show appeared at the JFL42 festival in Toronto in 2017. That same year also saw the release of Fisher and Hutchinson's first book, F*cked: Being Sexually Explorative and Self-Confident.

In 2018, Fisher and Hutchinson hosted Guys We Fest, a live comedy charity benefit show held at the Brooklyn Studio. Guests of the show included comedians Michael Che, Harrison Greenbaum, Mehran Khaghani and Jessica Kirson. The show managed to raise $8,000 for the Reproductive Health Access Project and New Alternatives, a nonprofit that works with homeless youth in the LGBTQ+ community.

The GWF podcast moved to the Luminary podcast app in 2019.

== Format ==
Each episode of the podcast starts with Hutchinson and Fisher discussing the events of the past week, followed by an interview with the week's guest. The show wraps up with Hutchinson and Fisher responding to listener emails, often giving advice in the realm of sex and relationships.

GWF initially featured interviews with former and current sexual partners of Fisher and Hutchinson. The hosts' intent was to combat slut-shaming by engaging in open and frank dialogue about their own sex lives. As the popularity of their show increased their selection of guests expanded to include interviews with professionals in the world of sex and sexual health. The show has covered topics such as dirty talk, bad one-night stands, feminism, sexual health, racial discrimination, domestic violence, and rape.

== Comedy Series ==
In 2022, it was reported that a comedy series based on the podcast is in development at Fox.

== Bibliography ==
- F*cked: Being Sexually Explorative and Self-Confident (2017), ISBN 978-0-06-266691-8
