= Scherger =

Scherger is a surname of German origin, possibly being a variant of the surname Scherge, which originated as an occupational name for a messenger bailiff henchman. Notable people with the surname include:

- Frederick Scherger (1904-1984), Australian military commander
- George Scherger (1920-2011), American professional baseball player, coach, and manager
- George L. Scherger (1874-1941), American minister, musician, writer, historian, and educator
- Joseph E. Scherger (born 1950), American medical director

== See also ==
- RAAF Base Scherger, a Royal Australian Air Force base in Queensland, Australia
