= Archives of Family Medicine =

- Discipline: Family Practice
- Language: English
- Edited by: Marjorie A. Bowman

Publication details
- Publisher: American Medical Association
- Frequency: Bimonthly

Standard abbreviations
- ISO 4: Arch. Fam. Med.

Indexing
- ISSN: 1063-3987
- OCLC no.: 26001153

The Archives of Family Medicine was an official publication of the American Medical Association from late 1992 through 2000. It was one of the first journals dedicated to family practice.

The journal was available by paid subscription. Its advertisements said it was indexed in MEDLINE.

The journal was closed in 2000, largely because insufficient advertising revenue. A few years after its closure, the far more successful Annals of Family Medicine was founded. No longer available from the A.M.A. archives, it remains accessible through CLOCKSS.
