= Annals of Family Medicine =

- Discipline: Family medicine
- Language: English
- Edited by: Caroline Richardson

Publication details
- History: 2003–present
- Frequency: Bimonthly
- Impact factor: 5.434 (2014)

Standard abbreviations
- ISO 4: Ann. Fam. Med.

Indexing
- ISSN: 1544-1709 (print); 1544-1717 (web)
- OCLC no.: 1050723710

Links
- Journal homepage; Online access; Online archive

Annals of Family Medicine is a bimonthly peer-reviewed medical journal that was established in May/June 2003. It publishes original research from the clinical, biomedical, social and health services sciences, as well as contributions on methodology and theory, selected reviews, essays, and invited editorials. The editor-in-chief is Caroline Richardson (University of Michigan). In 2014, the journal had an impact factor of 5.434.

The Annals published its first issue in 2003. The founding editor, who served as editor for 17 years through 2018, was Kurt Stange. The Annals was founded as an "unprecedented collaborative effort by 6 family medicine organizations coming together to support a forum for research and the intellectual development of the field [and is] overseen by an independent board of representatives from these 6 organizations: the American Academy of Family Physicians (AAFP), the American Board of Family Practice (ABFP), the Society of Teachers of Family Medicine (STFM), the Association of Departments of Family Medicine (ADFM), the Association of Family Practice Residency Directors (AFPRD), and the North American Primary Care Research Group (NAPCRG)."

== Abstracting and indexing ==
The journal is abstracted and indexed in MEDLINE, PsycINFO, CINAHL, Science Citation Index Expanded, and Current Contents/Clinical Medicine.

== See also ==
- List of medical journals
