= Canadian Centre for Refugee and Immigrant Health Care =

Healthcare clinic in Scarborough, Toronto, Canada

- Abbreviation: CCRIH
- Formation: 1999
- Headquarters: Scarborough, Toronto
- Fields: Immigrant and refugee healthcare
- Director: Paul Caulford
- Website: www.healthequity.ca

The Canadian Centre for Refugee and Immigrant Health Care is a healthcare clinic in Scarborough, Toronto, that provides free healthcare to refugee and immigrants.

The centre, which opened in 1999, is led by Paul Caulford M.D. As of 2021 it had 70 healthcare professionals providing care.

== Organization ==
The clinic is located at the intersection of Sheppard Avenue and Midland Avenue.

It is run by volunteers and led by Paul Caulford M.D.

== Activities ==
The clinic provides medical and dental services to people who had needs, but are not covered by the Ontario Health Insurance Plan, specifically refugees and migrants. The clinic regularly sees seriously ill patients who have been refused care due to their immigration status.

== History ==
The clinic opened in a church basement 1999. In 1999 it had three volunteer doctors, by 2021 that had grown to a team of 70 medical, dental and social workers.

In 2016, the centre saw a significant increase demand for services from woman and children refugees who had initially fled violence in various countries in Africa for USA, but due to new immigration policies enacted by Donald Trump, had fled the US for Canada. Patients, ill-prepared for the journey to Canada arrived with frostbite.

In 2018, the centre struggled to keep up with the demand for its services and made a public call for more nurses and doctors to volunteer.

In 2020, while providing COVID-19 vaccines, the center was running out of personal protective equipment.

== Notable staff and volunteers ==
- Paul Caulford, director
- Liberty Argonza-Andaya, Admin Lead

== See also ==
- Convention Relating to the Status of Refugees
