= Society of Family Planning =

International professional organization

- Abbreviation: SFP
- Formation: 2005
- Website: societyfp.org

The Society of Family Planning (SFP) is a non-profit professional organization specializing in abortion and contraception science with an interdisciplinary membership composed of physicians, nurses, sociologists, public health practitioners and trainees in these fields. The majority of member physicians include specialists of obstetrics and gynecology, family medicine, and adolescent medicine.

The organization sponsors the Society of Family Planning Research Fund that provides grants for research in abortion and contraception. This funding source was established in 2011. The Society of Family Planning supports the Fellowship in Complex Family Planning, previously known as the Fellowship in Family Planning. The fellowship is certified by the American Board of Obstetrics and Gynecology (ABOG), member of the American Board of Medical Specialties, as a subspecialty of Obstetrics and Gynecology.

== Background ==
The Society of Family Planning was created in 2005 by 18 founding members and 33 charter members, initially focusing on grant support for rigorous family planning research. Membership has expanded to almost 800 members as of 2017. As of 2020, the scope of the organization includes education based on clinical guidelines, research and grants, and advocacy through clinical guidelines and research. The organization holds an annual meeting called the North American Forum on Family Planning (the Forum).

There are three categories of membership: Fellow, Junior Fellow, and Affiliate Fellow. In order to apply for membership, a potential applicant must be referred by a current member. Members connect to the Society and collaborate with each other through Society of Family Planning Connect.

Contraception published by Elsevier is the official SFP medical journal. As of 2019, the journal has an Impact Factor of 2.819.

== Governance and committees ==
The Society of Family Planning is managed by staff members including an executive director and an elected Board of Directors. The organization is also made up of Committees, Subcommittees and Working Groups including the Executive, Governance, and Finance Committees; Complex Family Planning Council; Annual Meeting, Clinical Affairs and Research Affairs Subcommittees; Abortion Clinical Research Network Working Group; and Diversity, Equity and Inclusion Working Group.

== Research and grants ==
The Society of Family Planning was originally created to provide grant support for family planning research. While the Society's scope has expanded, it has continued to provide significant research support, funding over $2.6 million in grants in 2019. After an analysis of the impact of a decade of grantmaking, the Society of Family Planning Research Fund transitioned to funding targeted grant opportunities, published in the spring and awarded in the fall. SFP also supports the Abortion Clinical Research Network, a multi-site research network including independent clinics, Planned Parenthood affiliates, academic practices, patients, and researchers.

== Fellowship in Complex Family Planning ==
The Fellowship in Complex Family Planning (CFP) is accredited by the Accreditation Council for Graduate Medical Education as a two-year fellowship after completing specialty training in obstetrics and gynecology. The fellowship focuses on further clinical training and research on complex abortion and contraception. SFP's Complex Family Planning Council partners with ABOG to provide programmatic oversight of the fellowship. Many academic institutions offer this fellowship training including Columbia University; Johns Hopkins University; University of California, Davis; University of Michigan; University of Southern California; and Yale University.

== Legislative advocacy ==
Together with other medical and reproductive health organizations, the Society of Family Planning filed amicus briefs in Sebelius v. Hobby Lobby, later Burwell v. Hobby Lobby, to support increased access to the full range of contraceptive methods approved by the US Food and Drug Administration. In her dissenting opinion, Justice Ruth Bader Ginsburg highlighted the importance of contraception to women in whom pregnancy may pose life-threatening risk and non-contraceptive benefits including cancer prevention and treatment of menstrual disorders and pelvic pain.

The American Civil Liberties Union filed Chelius v. Wright on behalf of Dr. Graham Chelius, the Society of Family Planning, and other organizations against the restricted access to medical abortion.

The Society of Family Planning joined other medical organizations in the amicus brief ACOG v. US Food and Drug Administration against the in-person dispensing requirement of mifepristone in medical abortion.

== Collaborations ==
The American College of Obstetricians and Gynecologists (ACOG) and Society of Family Planning jointly developed clinical guidance on medical abortion up to 70 days' gestation. SFP endorsed ACOG's Practice Guideline on second-trimester abortion.

After a workshop entitled "Reproductive Services for Women at High Risk for Maternal Mortality", ACOG, SFP, Society for Maternal-Fetal Medicine (SMFM), and the Fellowship in Family Planning, now known as the Fellowship in Complex Family Planning, issued an executive summary and consensus statement regarding assessment, counseling, and training on reproductive health services for women at high risk for maternal morbidity and mortality. To promote development of evidence-based guidelines for reproductive health services associated with high-risk pregnancies, SFP and SMFM are partnering to offer the SMFM and SFP Bridge Builder Award for research funding. SMFM refers to SFP guidance on contraceptive provision when there is restricted healthcare access during the COVID-19 pandemic.

The Society of Family Planning released a statement to preserve timely access to abortion services during the COVID-19 pandemic, in collaboration with ACOG, ABOG, American Association of Gynecologic Laparoscopists, American Gynecological and Obstetrical Society, American Society for Reproductive Medicine, the Society for Academic Specialists in General Obstetrics and Gynecology, and SMFM.
