= Liberation 2 =

Studio album by Talib Kweli and Madlib
- Released: March 6, 2023
- Genre: Hip-hop
- Length: 45:51
- Label: Luminary
- Producer: Madlib

Talib Kweli and Madlib chronology
Liberation (2007)	Liberation 2 (2023)

Talib Kweli chronology
No Fear of Time (2022)	Liberation 2 (2023)	The Confidence of Knowing (2024)

Madlib chronology
Flying High (2022)	Liberation 2 (2023)	Madvillainy 2 (TBA)

Liberation 2 is a story of how agents can never stop true creatives from linking up and building. Our partnership with Luminary allows us to retain ownership, allowing us to create an exclusive experience for listeners. I'm excited to be at the forefront of Luminary's foray into the music space, and we have a chance to change the industry for the better with the release of this album.

—Talib Kweli on this album and its unique distribution format

Liberation 2 is a 2023 studio album from American hip-hop musicians Talib Kweli and Madlib, a sequel to their 2007 release Liberation.

== Reception ==
HipHopDX's Riley Wallace rated this album a 4.5 out of 5, calling it "a masterpiece" and also "timeless and devoid of any gimmicks or trendy timestamps" as well as perfectly timed. Writing for RapReviews, Sy Shackleford writes that the use of guest artists "exhibits a unity from within", but criticizes some production choices.

== Track listing ==
1. "Assata's Code" – 2:02
2. "Best Year Ever" – 1:43
3. "Air Quotes" – 3:36
4. "Nat Turner" – 4:18
5. "One for Biz" – 3:16
6. "Loop Digga's Revenge" – 2:48
7. "Ad Vice" – 3:37
8. "Wild Sweet Love" – 3:41
9. "Wild Beauty" – 3:13
10. "The Right to Love Us" – 2:51
11. "After These Messages" – 3:36
12. "Richies Part Two" – 4:39
13. "Marathon Thru Babylon" – 3:47
14. "Something Special" – 3:02
15. "Assata's Reprise" – 1:58

== Personnel ==
- Talib Kweli – rapping
- Madlib – rapping, production

Additional personnel

- Amani – rapping on "After These Messages"
- Roy Ayers – vibraphone on "Something Special"
- Diani – spoken word on "Assata's Code", rapping on "Air Quotes" and "Ad Vice"
- Goapele – vocals on "Loop Digga's Revenge"
- Seun Kuti – vocals on "Nat Turner"
- Roc Marciano – rapping on "Richies Part Two
- Mac Miller – rapping on "The Right to Love Us"
- Jessica Care Moore – vocals on "Wild Sweet Love"
- Meshell Ndegeocello – on "Marathon Thru Babylon"
- Cassper Nyovest – vocals on "Nat Turner"
- Pink Siifu – rapping on "Ad Vice"
- Q-Tip – rapping on "One for Biz"
- Westside Gunn – rapping on "Richies Part Two
- Wildchild – rapping on "One for Biz"

== See also ==
- List of 2023 albums
