= Luminary (podcast network) =

Podcast network

- Industry: Radio
- Genre: Podcasts
- Founded: 2019
- Founders: Joe Purzycki; Matt Sacks
- Headquarters: US
- Key people: Rishi Malhotra (CEO)
- Parent: Luminary Media LLC
- Website: luminarypodcasts.com

Luminary is a subscription podcast network that launched on 23 April 2019.

== History ==
It was launched by Luminary Media LLC, a venture-backed company, that was co-founded in 2018 by Joe Purzycki, and Matt Sacks. Preceding the launch, the company had raised $100 million in venture capital, from New Enterprise Associates and Sinai Ventures, among others. Nicholas Quah, writing for Vulture.com, described Luminary's launch week as "horrific", with licensing and permission issues, and other controversies. In late 2019, Simon Sutton replaced Matt Sacks as CEO.

In May 2020, Bloomberg News called Luminary a "money-losing podcasting startup" with an app that "has struggled to find an audience since its debut in April 2019. Only about 80,000 people who tried the app have remained paying subscribers" per sources. Bloomberg reported that the company had received "$30 million in a new round" of investment and was looking for additional funding due to the COVID-19 pandemic. Nicholas Quah, for Nieman Lab, commented that in light of Bloomberg's report "it would seem that Luminary's fundamental problem is that it didn't end up signing anybody who had a powerful enough pull to drive that many paid listeners. Sure, it assembled a catalog of interesting stuff, but it doesn't have a world-building Howard Stern/Bill Simmons-level asset, plain and simple".

Early 2022, Rishi Malhotra became CEO. In March 2022, Dave Chappelle's Pilot Boy Productions invested in Luminary with an undisclosed sum; Chappelle's podcast is also hosted by Luminary. Later that month, Jacob Kastrenakes, for The Verge, commented that "maybe Luminary's subscription-only podcast model still has legs". However, after scanning "the company's website before my chat with Malhotra, and nearly all of the shows featured on the front page hadn't posted new episodes in the past six months. In fact, if you look around Luminary's website, it's hard to find any shows that have updated recently. That's a tough sell for a service with a monthly subscription fee. [...] Luminary shows will continue to start and stop publishing throughout the year, Malhotra said, being produced in seasons more like a TV show".

The 2023 album Liberation 2 from Talib Kweli and Madlib was released exclusively on Luminary.

== Programming ==
List of Luminary Original Programs
Year	Title	Host or Starring	Genre	Co-producer	Notes
2019	Smartr	Noa Lukas	Comedy	Team Coco	
2019	The Ten	Zach Stafford	News & Politics	The Advocate	
2019	Frontier Tween	Maria Bamford, Conan O'Brien, Kerri Kenney, and Tim Baltz	Performing Arts	Team Coco	
2019	Players' Tribune: The Podcast	Various	Sports & Recreation	The Players' Tribune	
2019	Vocal Point	Martina McBride	Music	Believe Entertainment Group	
2019	Telephone Stories	Brandon Ogborn and Omar Crook	Music	Ninth Planet Audio	
2019	Hyper-Thetical	Kerry Bishé	Performing Arts	FilmNation Entertainment in association with Transmitter Media	
2020	Lies We Tell	Alex Gibney and Ellen Horne	Society & Culture	Jigsaw Productions	
2020	The Black List Podcast	Franklin Leonard	TV & Film	Ninth Planet Audio & The Black List	
2019	Poetics	Omari Hardwick	Music		
2019	Stoop Talks	Hana Baba and Leila Day	Society & Culture		
2019	Break Stuff: The Story of Woodstock '99	Steven Hyden	Music	The Ringer	
2019	Wisdom From The Top	Guy Raz	Careers	Built-It Productions, NPR	
2019	Tabloid	Vanessa Grigoriadis and Lux Alptraum	News & Politics	New York Magazine	
2019	Sonic Boom: How Seattle Lost Its Team	Jordan Ritter Conn	Sports & Recreation	The Ringer	
2019	Celeste & Her Best	Celeste Barber	Comedy		
2019	Karamo: The Podcast	Karamo Brown	Education		
2019	The Rewatchables 1999	Bill Simmons	TV & Film	The Ringer	
2021	Above the Noise	Russell Brand	Religion & Spirituality		
2020	Murder on the Towpath	Soledad O'Brien	History	FilmNation Entertainment in association with Neon Hum Media	
2015	History on Fire	Daniele Bolelli	History		
2019	Fiasco	Leon Neyfakh	News & Politics		
2017	Spooked	Glynn Washington	Performing Arts	Snap Judgment	
2019	The Trevor Noah Podcast	Trevor Noah	Comedy		
2019	The Roxane Gay Agenda	Roxane Gay	Society & Culture		
2019	The C-Word	Lena Dunham & Alissa Bennett	History		
2017	Under The Skin	Russell Brand	Religion & Spirituality		
2014	Guys We Fucked	Corinne Fisher and Krystyna Hutchinson	Sexuality		
2021	The Midnight Miracle	Talib Kweli, Yasiin Bey, and Dave Chappelle	Society & Culture		
2019	People's Party	Talib Kweli	Music	Uproxx	
2020	British Villains	William Green	History	Ninth Planet Audio & The Cut	
2020	The Passion Economy	Adam Davidson	Finance & Economics	Arrow Productions & Three Uncanny Four	
2016	I Am Rapaport	Michael Rapaport	Sports & Recreation	DBPodcasts	
