= American College of Osteopathic Family Physicians =

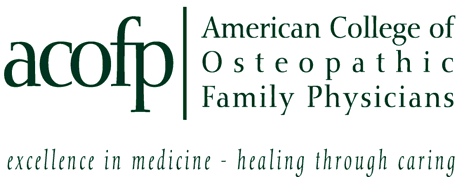
- Formation: 1950
- Type: Professional association
- Purpose: promote excellence in osteopathic family medicine through quality education, visionary leadership and responsible advocacy.
- Headquarters: Chicago, Illinois
- Location: United States
- Members: 22,000 osteopathic family physicians and medical students
- Official language: English
- President: Brian A. Kessler, DO, FACOFP dist.
- Executive Director: Bob Moore, MA, MS, CAE
- Budget: $6.9 million
- Website: www.acofp.org
- Formerly called: American College of General Practitioners in Osteopathic Medicine and Surgery

The American College of Osteopathic Family Physicians (ACOFP) is a professional association and a medical specialty college in the United States. Its membership consists of osteopathic physicians who practice family medicine, residents and medical students. ACOFP is closely affiliated with the American Osteopathic Association and is the osteopathic equivalent of the American Academy of Family Physicians. Much of the association's activities involve addressing the chronic shortage of family practitioners in the United States. It is responsible for setting the standards for the inspection of osteopathic graduate medical education programs in family practice.

== History ==
ACOFP was founded on February 11, 1950, in Los Angeles, California. It is headquartered in Chicago, Illinois.

ACOFP was founded as the American College of General Practitioners in Osteopathic Medicine and Surgery. The organization quickly assumed the unofficial name of American College of Osteopathic General Practitioners. In 1993, the organization's name was officially changed to the American College of Osteopathic Family Physicians. The first educational meeting was held in Des Moines, Iowa, in 1958. The original headquarters and treasury office were located in California. After the merger between the California Osteopathic Association and the California Medical Association the funds possessed by ACOFP were turned over to the California Medical Society. ACOFP subsequently relocated its headquarters to Chicago.

In the mid-1960s, about 4% of osteopathic physicians in the United States were members of the ACOFP. By 2003, membership rates were at 27% of osteopathic physicians. Since 1955, ACOFP has presented the award Family Practitioner of the Year.

In March 2012, ACOFP announced that they partnered with the company MDdatacor to provide physicians with the tools necessary to develop their practices into official patient-centered medical homes.

ACOFP also includes a student association, which hosts chapters from each of the osteopathic medical schools in the United States.

== Osteopathic Family Physician ==
The organization also publishes its own peer-reviewed medical journal, the Osteopathic Family Physician. The journal is designed to help osteopathic family physicians care for their patients, improve their practices, and understand the activities ACOFP is taking on their behalf. The content covers preventive medicine, managed care, osteopathic principles and practices, pain management, public health, medical education, and practice management. The journal is published through Elsevier.

== Fellow of the American College of Osteopathic Family Physicians ==
The organization periodically bestows the honor of "Fellow of the American College of Osteopathic Family Physicians" (FACOFP) onto a physician with outstanding contributions to the profession of osteopathic family medicine nationally and locally, through teaching, authorship, research, or professional leadership.

== See also ==
- American Osteopathic Board of Family Physicians
