= European Journal of General Practice =

- Discipline: Family medicine
- Language: English
- Edited by: Jako Burgers

Publication details
- History: 1995-present
- Publisher: Taylor & Francis
- Frequency: Quarterly
- Impact factor: 1.217 (2014)

Standard abbreviations
- ISO 4: Eur. J. Gen. Pract.

Indexing
- ISSN: 1381-4788 (print); 1751-1402 (web)
- LCCN: 96039099
- OCLC no.: 291143255

Links
- Journal homepage; Online access; Online archive

The European Journal of General Practice is a quarterly peer-reviewed medical journal covering family medicine. It was established in 1995 and is published by Taylor & Francis. It is the official journal of WONCA Europe. The editor-in-chief is Jako Burgers (Maastricht University). According to the Journal Citation Reports, the journal has a 2023 impact factor of 2.3.
