= American Osteopathic Board of Family Physicians =

American medical professional association

- Abbreviation: AOBFP
- Formation: 1972
- Type: Professional
- Headquarters: 142 E. Ontario St, Chicago, IL
- Coordinates: 41.8935907°N 87.6235798°W
- Chairman: Joan Grzybowski, DO
- Vice Chairman: Kenneth Heiles, DO
- Website: aobfp.org
- Formerly called: American Osteopathic Board of General Practitioners

The American Osteopathic Board of Family Physicians (AOBFP) is an organization that provides board certification to qualified osteopathic physicians (D.O.) who specialize in delivering comprehensive primary care for patients of all ages, genders, and addressing all parts of the body (family physicians). The board is one of 16 medical specialty certifying boards of the American Osteopathic Association Bureau of Osteopathic Specialists approved by the American Osteopathic Association (AOA), and was established in 1972. There are over 15,000 osteopathic family physicians actively certified by the AOBFP.

== Board certification ==
Initial certification is available to osteopathic candidates who have completed an AOA-approved family medicine residency within the past six years, or the candidate may apply for examination during their final year of an AOA or ACGME-approved training and sit for the examination up to six (6) months before completion of their residency training program.

Voluntary recertification was first offered in Fall 1994, and mandatory recertification began in March 1997. Before this time, the initial board certification was permanent, and recertification was not required. If a physician does not complete the required OCC, including annual participation in longitudinal assessment, their board certification status will expire.

Osteopathic family physicians may also receive subspecialty certification in the following areas:

- Geriatrics
- Sports medicine
- Addiction medicine
- Hospice and palliative care
- Sleep medicine
- Hyperbaric medicine

Physicians must maintain an active primary certification, along with the OCC requirements for their subspecialty certifications, for all certifications to remain active.

To be board-certified in any specialty, an osteopathic physician must participate in an annual longitudinal assessment and complete at least 120 hours of continuing medical education over three years.

== See also ==
- American Board of Family Medicine
- American College of Osteopathic Family Physicians
- AOA Bureau of Osteopathic Specialists
