= Oregon-Canadian Forest Products =

Oregon-Canadian Forest Products, Inc.
- Company type: Private
- Industry: Lumber
- Founded: 1977
- Founder: Wayne Holm, Gloria Holm
- Headquarters: North Plains, Oregon, United States; 45.5981909°N 123.0057608°W
- Area served: Worldwide
- Key people: Wayne Holm (Chairman); Mike Holm (President)
- Products: Dried Lumber, Finish Lumber, Posts and Beams, Dimensional Boards
- Number of employees: Approx. 150 (2014)
- Website: www.ocfp.com

Oregon-Canadian Forest Products, Inc., known as OCFP or simply Oregon-Canadian, is an American lumber product manufacturer headquartered in North Plains in Oregon's Portland metropolitan area. It has been recognized as one of the top 100 private companies in Oregon. They are the largest manufacturer of high-grade Douglas fir lumber in the United States. They are also the only company that makes wood gutters used for the restoration of homes on the East Coast.

== History ==
Founded in 1977, Oregon-Canadian Forest Products began as a wholesale operation with three employees. In 2004, Oregon-Canadian Forest Products donated funding and materials to construct a new 2,500 square foot library for the city of North Plains. By 2008, the company had grown to 150 employees across three facilities with annual revenues of $63 million, but had shrunk back to 100 employees by late 2009. In 2011, Oregon-Canadian donated material to the North Plains Senior Center.
