= Contraception (journal) =

- Discipline: Obstetrics and gynecology
- Language: English
- Edited by: Carolyn Westhoff

Publication details
- History: 1970-present
- Publisher: Elsevier
- Frequency: Monthly
- Impact factor: 2.335 (2014)

Standard abbreviations
- ISO 4: Contraception

Indexing
- CODEN: CCPTAY
- ISSN: 0010-7824
- LCCN: 70012711
- OCLC no.: 643682625

Links
- Journal homepage; Online access; Online archive

Contraception is a monthly peer-reviewed medical journal covering reproductive medicine. It is published by Elsevier and was established in 1970. It is the official journal of the Association of Reproductive Health Professionals and the Society of Family Planning. The founding editor-in-chief was Daniel R. Mishell Jr. (University of Southern California) and the current one is Carolyn Westhoff (Mailman School of Public Health). According to the Journal Citation Reports, the journal has a 2014 impact factor of 2.335, ranking it 23rd out of 79 journals in the category "Obstetrics & Gynecology".
