= American Academy of Family Physicians =

American medical organization

American Academy of Family Physicians (AAFP)
- Abbreviation: AAFP
- Formation: 1947; 79 years ago
- Type: Professional association
- Headquarters: Leawood, Kansas
- Location: United States
- Members: 136,700
- CEO and Executive Vice President: R. Shawn Martin
- Key people: President, Sarah C. Nosal, MD; Board Chair, Jennifer L. Brull, MD
- Staff: 415
- Website: aafp.org
- Formerly called: American Academy of General Practice

The American Academy of Family Physicians (AAFP) was founded in 1947 to promote and maintain high-quality standards for family medicine, an offshoot of the classical general practitioner. It is headquartered in Leawood, Kansas.

AAFP is one of the largest medical organizations in the United States, with 128,300 members in 50 U.S. states and territories, in addition to international members. The AAFP was instrumental in establishing family medicine as medicine's 20th primary specialty. The AMA's Council on Medical Education and the independent American Board of Medical Specialties granted approval to a certifying board in family medicine on February 8, 1969.

== History ==
The AAFP was founded in 1947 during the American Medical Association meeting held in Atlantic City on June 10, 1947. At that meeting, a group of physicians held a separate meeting and launched a new association named The American Academy of General Practice. On October 3, 1971, the organization's name was changed to The American Academy of Family Physicians, to "more accurately reflect the changing nature of primary health care".

== Mission and objectives ==
The mission of the AAFP is to improve the health of patients, families and communities by serving the needs of members with professionalism and creativity.

To fulfill its mission, the AAFP's strategic objectives include:

- Support and sustain family medicine practices that ensure the value of your comprehensive services.
- Reduce administrative complexity that detracts from patient care.
- Equip members with clinical expertise to provide high-quality, evidence-based care and address health disparities.
- Grow a family physician workforce that fully represents our country's diversity.

The AAFP also provides patients with free educational resources on its consumer health site.

== Structure ==
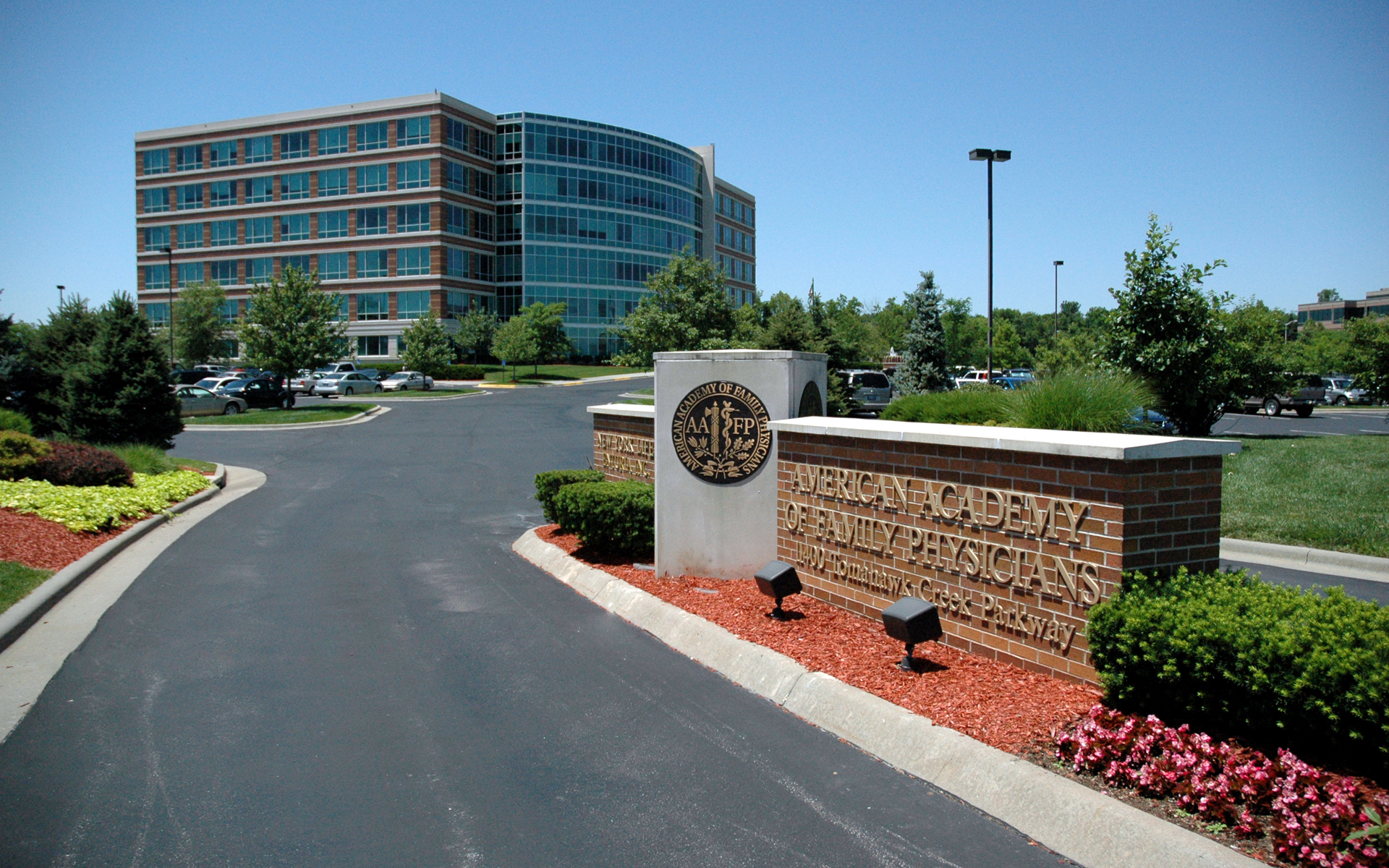
AAFP headquarters in Leawood, Kansas

The AAFP is governed by a Congress of Delegates composed of two delegates from each of its 55 constituent chapters, as well as from resident and student groups, new physicians, and the special constituencies (women, minorities, international medical graduates, and LGBTQs). The Congress meets annually immediately prior to the academy's Family Medicine Experience (FMX) event (formerly known as Scientific Assembly) and has sole power to establish policies and define principles. These policies are carried out between annual meetings by the board of directors and a number of standing and special commissions and committees. Delegates to the Congress of Delegates elect the Board, which in turn appoints commission and committee members. Constituent chapters are organized similarly.

== Publications ==
- AAFP News—the official news publication of the American Academy of Family Physicians
- American Family Physician—an editorially independent official peer-reviewed, clinical review medical journal for physicians and other health care professionals.
- Family Practice Management—a peer-reviewed, practice improvement journal dedicated to offering practical ideas for better practice, better patient care, and a better work life for family physicians.
- Annals of Family Medicine—a collaborative effort with six family medicine organizations

== See also ==
- Advanced Life Support in Obstetrics (ALSO)
- American Board of Family Medicine (ABFM)
- American Osteopathic Board of Family Physicians (AOBFP)
- American College of Osteopathic Family Physicians
- Family medicine
- World Organization of Family Doctors (Wonca)
