= Journal of the American Board of Family Medicine =

- Discipline: Family medicine
- Language: English
- Edited by: Marjorie A. Bowman

Publication details
- Former name(s): The Journal of the American Board of Family Practice
- History: 1988–present
- Publisher: American Board of Family Medicine (United States)
- Frequency: bimonthly
- Open access: Yes

Standard abbreviations
- ISO 4: J. Am. Board Fam. Med.

Indexing
- CODEN: JABPEJ
- ISSN: 1557-2625 (print); 1558-7118 (web)
- LCCN: 87002315 sn 87002315
- OCLC no.: 61225895

Links
- Journal homepage; Online access

The Journal of the American Board of Family Medicine is the official publication of the American Board of Family Medicine. It was formerly published as The Journal of the American Board of Family Practice by the Board of the Massachusetts Medical Society.
