= Ontario College of Family Physicians =

The Ontario College of Family Physicians is an organization in Ontario for family physicians. It is known for its review of the health effects of pesticides.

In 2004 researchers from the Ontario College of Family Physicians reviewed the epidemiological literature from 1992 to 2003 on health effects and concluded that "exposure to all the commonly used pesticides — phenoxyherbicides, organophosphates, carbamates, and pyrethrins — has shown positive associations with adverse health effects" Shortly after its release the review was criticized by the UK's Advisory on Pesticides Committee, which the authors responded to. In 2007 related reviews were published in separate articles on the cancer effects and the non-cancer effects.

== See also ==
- College of Physicians and Surgeons of Ontario
- The College of Family Physicians of Canada
- Collège des médecins du Québec
