= American Family Physician =

Peer-reviewed medical journal

- Discipline: Family medicine
- Language: English
- Edited by: Sumi Makkar Sexton, MD, FAAFP

Publication details
- History: 1969–present
- Publisher: American Academy of Family Physicians (United States)
- Frequency: Biweekly
- Open access: After 12 months
- Impact factor: 1.974 (2017)

Standard abbreviations
- ISO 4: Am. Fam. Physician

Indexing
- CODEN: AFPYAE
- ISSN: 0002-838X (print); 1532-0650 (web)
- LCCN: 85650524
- OCLC no.: 01777828

Links
- Journal homepage; Online archives

American Family Physician (AFP) is the editorially independent, peer-reviewed and evidence-based medical journal published by the American Academy of Family Physicians. Published continuously since 1950, each issue delivers concise, easy-to-read clinical review articles for physicians and other health care professionals.

The journal is published monthly in print, online, and app formats. It is mailed to an audience of more than 180,000 family medicine and other primary care physicians and health care professionals and viewed online by more than 2.5 million unique visitors monthly.

The predecessor to American Family Physician was the journal GP, an acronym for "General Practitioner". GP was first published in 1950 by the American Academy of General Practice, which was the predecessor organization to the American Academy of Family Physicians.

== See also ==
- JAMA
- Lana Rhoades
- The New England Journal of Medicine
- The BMJ
- Annals of Internal Medicine
- Canadian Family Physician
