= Canadian Family Physician =

Canadian Family Physician Le Médecin de famille canadien
- Cover of the March 2024 issue
- Discipline: Family medicine
- Language: English, French
- Edited by: Nicholas Pimlott

Publication details
- Former names: Journal – College of General Practice of Canada, Bulletin – College of General Practice of Canada
- History: 1967–present
- Publisher: College of Family Physicians of Canada (Canada)
- Frequency: Monthly
- Open access: Yes
- Impact factor: 3.275 (2020)

Standard abbreviations
- ISO 4: Can. Fam. Physician

Indexing
- ISSN: 0008-350X (print); 1715-5258 (web)
- OCLC no.: 01855088

Links
- Journal homepage; Online access; Online archive

Canadian Family Physician (French: Le Médecin de famille canadien) is a monthly peer-reviewed open-access medical journal published by the College of Family Physicians of Canada. It provides continuing medical education for family physicians and other primary care clinicians. The journal publishes original articles presenting a family medicine perspective to clinical medicine through approaches to common clinical conditions and evidence-based clinical reviews intended to assist family physicians in patient care. Most articles are published in both English and French. The journal was established in 1967 and the editor-in-chief is Nicholas Pimlott (University of Toronto).

== Abstracting and indexing ==
The journal is abstracted and indexed in the following databases:

- CAB Abstracts
- CINAHL
- Current Contents/Clinical Medicine
- Index Medicus/MEDLINE/PubMed
- Embase
- Science Citation Index Expanded
- Scopus

According to the Journal Citation Reports, its 2020 impact factor is 3.275.

== See also ==
- American Family Physician
- Canadian Medical Association Journal
