= American Board of Family Medicine =

Independent American medical association

The American Board of Family Medicine (ABFM) is a non-profit, independent medical association of American physicians who practice in family medicine and its sub-specialties. Founded in February 1969 as the American Board of Family Practice (ABFP), the group was the 20th medical specialty to be recognized by the American Board of Medical Specialties and was formed out of a need to encourage medical school graduates to enter general practice. It adopted its current name in 2005.

The American Board of Family Medicine is the second largest medical specialty board in the United States. Its purposes include:

- Improving the quality of medical care available to the public
- Establishing and maintaining standards in the specialty of family medicine
- Improving the standards of medical education for training in family medicine
- Determining by evaluation the fitness of specialists in family medicine who apply for and hold certificates

== Mission ==
The mission of the ABFM is to improve the health of the public through:

1. Certification
2. Training Standards: The ABFM sets standards for the training that prepares Family Medicine residents for board certification.
3. Research: The ABFM funds, conducts, and publishes research that is devoted to creating, evaluating, and maintaining cutting-edge certification methods, and to advancing the scientific basis of Family Medicine.
4. Leadership Development: The ABFM cultivates leaders in Family Medicine to expand the specialty's contribution to the health of the public.
5. Collaboration: The ABFM collaborates with other specialty boards and organizations to promote better health care, drive better outcomes, and manage health care resources responsibly.

== Certification ==
Candidates seeking certification or recertification must meet the eligibility criteria specified by the American Board of Family Medicine. Candidates must complete all requirements, culminating in the successful completion of the cognitive examination.

Certification candidates must have satisfactorily completed three years of training in a Family Medicine residency program accredited by the Accreditation Council for Graduate Medical Education (ACGME) subsequent to receipt of the M.D. or D.O. degree from an accredited institution. Additional policies apply to candidates who have completed their medical or residency training outside the United States.

The American Board of Family Medicine requires periodic recertification to maintain Diplomate status.

== Family Medicine Certification (FMC) ==
Family Medicine Certification (FMC) is the process that provides the American Board of Family Medicine (ABFM) with the means to continually assess Diplomates. The American Board of Medical Specialties (ABMS) determined that ABMS specialists within every discipline should be required to meet the highest standards of accountability. In response, the ABMS designed a process called Maintenance of Certification, and each specialty board within the ABMS has agreed to adhere to a set structure in developing their own individual programs. This structure consists of four components, each designed to assess important physician characteristics: Professionalism, Self-assessment and Lifelong Learning, Cognitive Expertise, and Performance Improvement. Although these elements are similar to and consistent with the ABFM's long-standing recertification program, Family Medicine Certification stresses the importance of ongoing participation in activities that evaluate each of these components between recertification examinations. Family Medicine Certification is a requirement that the ABFM believes encourages clinical excellence and benefits both physicians and their patients.

== Publications ==
The Journal of the American Board of Family Medicine is the official publication of the board, succeeding The Journal of the American Board of Family Practice which was published 1988–2005.

== Reciprocity agreements ==
The American Board of Family Medicine has reciprocity agreements with the College of Family Physicians of Canada, Royal College of General Practitioners United Kingdom, the Royal New Zealand College of General Practitioners, and the Royal Australian College of General Practitioners. Diplomates of the ABFM may be eligible to seek certification by these colleges as well. Members in good standing of these colleges who meet all other requirements of the ABFM and reside in the United States may be eligible to take the Certification Examination. Eligibility to sit for the American Board of Family Medicine Certification Examination through reciprocity is available only to physicians who have satisfactorily completed formal Family Medicine or General Practitioner training accredited by a nationally recognized accrediting organization within Canada, United Kingdom, Australia, or New Zealand.

== See also ==
- American Academy of Family Physicians
- American Board of Medical Specialties
- American Osteopathic Board of Family Physicians
