= College of Family Physicians of Canada =

Canadian professional organization

- Abbreviation: CFPC
- Formation: 1954
- Type: Professional society, Regulatory college
- Legal status: Active
- Purpose: Family medicine certification; advocacy, life-long learning
- Headquarters: Mississauga, Ontario, Canada
- Region served: Canada
- Members: 38,000 members
- Official languages: English and French
- Website: https://www.cfpc.ca/en/home

The College of Family Physicians of Canada (CFPC; French: Collège des médecins de famille du Canada, CMFC) is a professional association and the legal certifying body for the practice of family medicine in Canada. This national organization of family physicians was founded in 1954 and incorporated in 1968. Although membership is not mandatory to practice medicine, it currently numbers over 38,000 members. Members of the CFPC belong to the national College, as well as to their provincial or territorial chapters. The CFPC uses both English and French as official communication languages.

The CFPC establishes the standards for the training, certification, and lifelong education of family physicians in Canada. It accredits postgraduate family medicine training programs in Canadian medical schools, conducts the certification examination for graduating family medicine residents, and grants the certification (CCFP) and fellowship (FCFP) designations to its members.

The CFPC is a member of the World Organization of Family Doctors. The CFPC is based in Mississauga, Ontario.

== History ==
The CFPC was founded in 1954 in Vancouver, British Columbia, as the "College of General Practice of Canada" out of a need to ensure family physicians were dedicated to continuing medical education. There were 400 members at inception. Victor L. Johnston, the first executive director, remained in office for ten consecutive years. The first executive committee and board of representatives consisted of 17 members. In 1964, the College obtained its current name.

== Governance ==
The CFPC is governed by members of the executive committee and the board of representatives.

== Collaboration with the Medical Council of Canada ==
In 2013, the CFPC collaborated with the Medical Council of Canada (MCC) to deliver a new "harmonized" certification examination in family medicine. Those who passed the new examination and met all other qualifications of both organizations were awarded both the Licentiate of the Medical Council of Canada (LMCC), the medical license to practice in Canada, and the certification in family medicine designation (CCFP). Nevertheless, upon review of the harmonized examination, the CFPC determined that the Certification Examination in Family Medicine did not result in the anticipated benefits for the Certification decision. For this reason, starting in 2016, the two examinations were once again run separately, as they were prior to 2013.

== Continuing professional development ==
The CFPC has numerous opportunities for the continuing professional development of its physician members.

=== Mainpro+ ===
The CFPC runs a program designed to support the continuous professional development of its members called Mainpro+ (Maintenance of Proficiency). This program assesses proposed learning modules and seminars against established standards and awards various types and numbers of credits that physicians can earn by participating in these learning opportunities. Credits are recorded and physicians must meet a standard number and type of credits in order to maintain their certification (CCFP).

=== Canadian Family Physician ===
The CFPC's official monthly journal is Canadian Family Physician.

Family physicians have the possibility of accumulating MAINPRO credits by "performing brief reflective exercises after reading eligible articles in the journal," thereby contributing to the spread of family medicine stories and experience across the country to the various readers of CFP.

=== Family Medicine Forum ===
Each year, the CFPC hosts the Family Medicine Forum (FMF), a national family medicine conference. The conference offers hundreds of clinical and professional development sessions for family physicians over three days in November. The conference is held at varying host cities and provinces each year. The 2016 FMF was held in Vancouver, British Columbia.

=== Research and Education Foundation ===
The Research and Education Foundation of the CFPC was established to provide funding for honours, awards, scholarships, and grants bestowed by the organization to its members. It is a registered charity with the Government of Canada.

== Enhanced skills programs ==
The CFPC recognizes several enhanced skills programs that generally last between three and twelve months. These advanced programs are accessible to practicing family physicians as well as Canadian medical residents who are completing their second year of residency in family medicine. In some cases, the enhanced skills program counts as a third year of residency. The following are some existing enhanced skills programs, which are recognized by the College of Family Physicians of Canada (CFPC) and lead to the obtention of a Certificate of Added Competence (CAC) in a specialized domain of family and community medicine:

- Emergency medicine (post-nominal designation: CCFP-EM)
- Palliative care (post-nominal designation: CCFP-PC)
- Care of the elderly (post-nominal designation: CCFP-COE)
- Sport and exercise medicine (post-nominal designation: CCFP-SEM)
- Anesthesia (post-nominal designation: CCFP-FPA)
- Addiction medicine (post-nominal designation: CCFP-AM)
- Enhanced surgical skills (post-nominal designation: CCFP-ESS)

Some other enhanced skills programs which do not necessarily lead to a certificate of added competence with the CFPC but are nonetheless accessible for graduating or practicing family physicians include the following:

- Maternal and child care
- Clinician-scholar program with various streams including research, education, or management (often involves the completion of a Master's degree in science [M.Sc.] or business administration [MBA] or a Doctor of Philosophy [Ph.D.])
- Medical oncology
- Breast diseases
- Clinical environmental health
- Global health or vulnerable populations
- HIV care
- Hospital medicine
- Indigenous health
- Low-risk obstetrics
- Women's health
- Special populations

Physician members of the Canadian Forces can benefit from supplementary training and obtain the Certificate of Added Competence in Emergency Medicine via subsidized education from the Department of National Defence of Canada.

== Student interest groups in family medicine ==
Several medical schools in Canada have student interest groups in family medicine, as well as other medical specialties. These student interest groups often organize activities that allow fellow medical students to explore some facets of the medical specialty. In September 2014, for example, the family medicine student interest group at McGill University hosted the sixth family medicine student symposium, gathering over 600 students from the four Quebec faculties of medicine (McGill University, Université de Montréal, Université Laval, and Université de Sherbrooke), as well as the University of Ottawa. While the conferences took place in the McIntyre Medical Sciences Building, the workshops led by practicing physicians and family medicine residents took place in McGill's medical simulation center near the downtown campus.

== See also ==
- Royal College of Physicians and Surgeons of Canada
- Collège des médecins du Québec
- Ontario College of Family Physicians
- College of Physicians and Surgeons of Ontario
- Alberta College of Physicians and Surgeons
