= Family medicine =

Medical specialty

- Focus: Primary care, preventive healthcare
- Significant diseases: Hypertension, URTI, arthritis, diabetes, mental health, pneumonia, AOM, back pain, dermatitis
- Specialist: Family physician

Family medicine physician
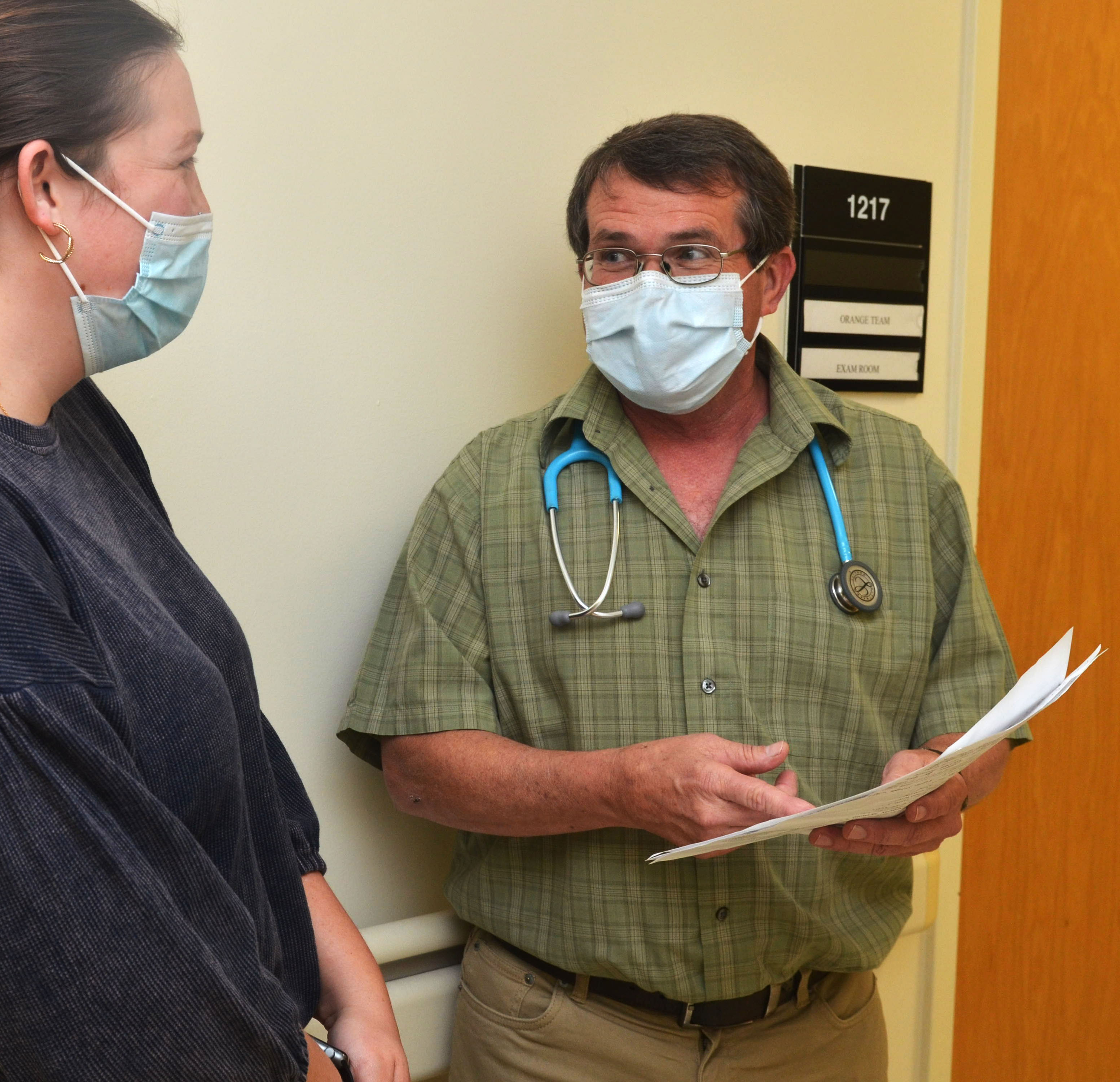
- Family physician (right) reviewing a case with nurse (left) in clinic

Occupation
- Names: Physician
- Synonym: Family doctor
- Occupation type: Specialty
- Activity sectors: Medicine

Description
- Education required: Doctor of Medicine (M.D.); Bachelor of Medicine, Bachelor of Surgery (M.B.B.S.); Bachelor of Medicine, Bachelor of Surgery (MBChB); Doctor of Osteopathic medicine (D.O.)
- Fields of employment: Hospitals, clinics, emergency departments, long-term care

Family medicine (Note: Less commonly referred to as family practice) is a medical specialty that provides continuing and comprehensive health care for the individual and family across all ages, sexes, diseases, and parts of the body. The specialist, who is usually a primary care physician, is called a family physician. (Note: or, more informally, family doctor) In certain countries family medicine is synonymous with general practice (with those who practice known as a general practitioner), though in other countries, this is a distinct field than Family medicine. Historically, the role of Family doctors was once performed by any doctor with qualifications from a medical school and who worked in the community. However, since the 1950s, family medicine has become a specialty in its own right, with specific training requirements tailored to each country. The names of the specialty emphasize its holistic nature and/or its roots in the family. It is based on knowledge of the patient in the context of the family and the community, focusing on disease prevention and health promotion. According to the World Organization of Family Doctors (WONCA), the aim of family medicine is "promoting personal, comprehensive and continuing care for the individual in the context of the family and the community". The issues of values underlying this practice are usually known as primary care ethics.

== Scope of practice ==
Family physicians in the United States must hold either an M.D. or a D.O. degree. Physicians who specialize in family medicine must successfully complete an accredited three or four year long family medicine residency in the United States in addition to their medical degree. They are then eligible to sit for a board certification examination, which is now required by most hospitals and health plans. American Board of Family Medicine requires its diplomates to maintain certification through an ongoing process of continuing medical education, medical knowledge review, patient care oversight through chart audits, practice-based learning through quality improvement projects and retaking the board certification examination every 5 to 10 years. The American Osteopathic Board of Family Physicians requires its diplomates to maintain certification and undergo the process of recertification every 8 years.

Physicians are certified in family medicine in Canada through the College of Family Physicians of Canada after completion of two years of family medicine residency, among other requirements. Continuing education is also a requirement for maintenance of certification.

The term "family medicine" or "family physician" is used in the United States, Mexico, South America, many European and Asian countries. In Sweden, certification in family medicine requires five years working with a tutor, after the medical degree. In India, those who want to specialize in family medicine must complete a three-year family medicine residency, after their medical degree (MBBS). They are awarded either a D.N.B. or an M.D. in family medicine. Similar systems exist in other countries.

In the United States, family medicine physicians are certified under the American Board of Family Medicine (ABFM) or American Osteopathic Board of Family Physicians (AOBFP), while general practitioners are certified under the American Board of General Practice (ABGP). In contrast, General practice is used synonymously with Family medicine in many other nations, such as the United Kingdom, Australia, New Zealand, and South Africa. Such services are provided by general practitioners. The term primary care in the UK may also include services provided by community pharmacy, optometrist, dental surgery and community hearing care providers. The balance of care between primary care and secondary care - which usually refers to hospital-based services - varies from place to place, and with time.

In many countries there are initiatives to move services out of hospitals into the community, in the expectation that this will save money and be more convenient.

Family physicians deliver a range of acute, chronic, and preventive medical care services. In addition to diagnosing and treating illness, they also provide preventive care, including routine checkups, health-risk assessments, immunization and screening tests, and personalized counselling on maintaining a healthy lifestyle. Family physicians also manage chronic illness, often coordinating care provided by other sub-specialists. Family doctors also practice safety-netting, which involves follow-up assessments for uncertain diagnoses associated with symptoms that could be innocuous, but may also be a sign of serious illness. Many American Family Physicians deliver babies and provide prenatal care. In the U.S., family physicians treat more patients with back pain than any other physician sub-specialist, and about as many as orthopedists and neurosurgeons combined.

Family medicine and family physicians play a vital role in the healthcare system of a country. In the U.S. for example, nearly one in four of all office visits are made to family physicians. That is 208 million office visits each year — nearly 83 million more than the next largest medical specialty. Today, family physicians provide more care for America's underserved and rural populations than any other medical specialty.

== In Canada ==
=== Education and training ===
In Canada, aspiring family physicians are expected to complete a residency in family medicine from an accredited university after obtaining their Doctor of Medicine degree. Although the residency usually has a duration of two years, graduates may apply to complete a third year, leading to a certification from the College of Family Physicians of Canada in disciplines such as emergency medicine, palliative care, care of the elderly, sports and exercise medicine, and women's health, amongst others.

In some institutions, such as McGill University in Montreal, graduates from family medicine residency programs are eligible to complete a master's degree and a Doctor of Philosophy (Ph.D.) in family medicine, which predominantly consists of a research-oriented program.

== In the United States ==
=== History of medical family practice ===
Concern for family health and medicine in the United States existed as far back as the early 1930s and 40s. The American public health advocate Bailey Barton Burritt was labeled "the father of the family health movement" by The New York Times in 1944.

Following World War II, two main concerns shaped the advent of family medicine. First, medical specialties and subspecialties increased in popularity, having an adverse effect on the number of physicians in general practice. At the same time, many medical advances were being made and there was concern within the "general practitioner" or "GP" population that four years of medical school plus a one-year internship was no longer adequate preparation for the breadth of medical knowledge required of the profession. Many of these doctors wanted to see a residency program added to their training; this would not only give them additional training, knowledge, and prestige but would allow for board certification, which was increasingly required to gain hospital privileges. In February 1969, family medicine (then known as family practice) was recognized as a distinct specialty in the U.S. It was the twentieth specialty to be recognized.

=== Education and training ===
Family physicians complete an undergraduate degree, medical school, and three more years of specialized medical residency training in family medicine. Their residency training includes rotations in internal medicine, pediatrics, obstetrics-gynecology, psychiatry, surgery, emergency medicine, and geriatrics, in addition to electives in a wide range of other disciplines. Residents also must provide care for a panel of continuity patients in an outpatient "model practice" for the entire period of residency. The specialty focuses on treating the whole person, acknowledging the effects of all outside influences, through all stages of life. Family physicians will see anyone with any problem, but are experts in common problems. Many family physicians deliver babies in addition to taking care of patients of all ages.

In order to become board certified, family physicians must complete a residency in family medicine, possess a full and unrestricted medical license, and take a written cognitive examination. Between 2003 and 2009, the process for maintenance of board certification in family medicine is being changed (as well as all other American Specialty Boards) to a series of yearly tests on differing areas. The American Board of Family Medicine, as well as other specialty boards, are requiring additional participation in continuous learning and self-assessment to enhance clinical knowledge, expertise and skills. The Board has created a program called the "Maintenance of Certification Program for Family Physicians" (MC-FP) which will require family physicians to continuously demonstrate proficiency in four areas of clinical practice: professionalism, self-assessment/lifelong learning, cognitive expertise, and performance in practice. Three hundred hours of continuing medical education within the prior six years is also required to be eligible to sit for the exam.

Family physicians may pursue fellowships in several fields, including adolescent medicine, geriatric medicine, sports medicine, sleep medicine, hospital medicine and hospice and palliative medicine. The American Board of Family Medicine and the American Osteopathic Board of Family Medicine both offer Certificates of Added Qualifications (CAQs) in each of these topics.

=== Shortage of family physicians ===
Many sources cite a shortage of family physicians (and also other primary care providers, i.e. internists, pediatricians, and general practitioners). The per capita supply of primary care physicians has increased about 1 percent per year since 1998. A recent decrease in the number of M.D. graduates pursuing a residency in primary care has been offset by the number of D.O. graduates and graduates of international medical schools (IMGs) who enter primary care residencies. Still, projections indicate that by 2020 the demand for family physicians will exceed their supply.

The number of students entering family medicine residency training has fallen from a high of 3,293 in 1998 to 1,172 in 2008, according to National Residency Matching Program data. Fifty-five family medicine residency programs have closed since 2000, while only 28 programs have opened.

In 2006, when the nation had 100,431 family physicians, a workforce report by the American Academy of Family Physicians indicated the United States would need 139,531 family physicians by 2020 to meet the need for primary medical care. To reach that figure 4,439 family physicians must complete their residencies each year, but currently, the nation is attracting only half the number of future family physicians that will be needed.

To address this shortage, leading family medicine organizations launched an initiative in 2018 to ensure that by 2030, 25% of combined US allopathic and osteopathic medical school seniors select family medicine as their specialty. The initiative is termed the "25 x 2030 Student Choice Collaborative", and the following eight family medicine organizations have committed resources to reaching this goal:

- American Academy of Family Physicians
- American Academy of Family Physicians Foundation
- American Board of Family Medicine
- American College of Osteopathic Family Physicians
- Association of Departments of Family Medicine
- Association of Family Medicine Residency Directors
- North American Primary Care Research Group
- Society of Teachers of Family Medicine

The waning interest in family medicine in the U.S. is likely due to several factors, including the lesser prestige associated with the specialty, the lesser pay, the limited ACGME approved fellowship opportunities, and the increasingly frustrating practice environment. Salaries for family physicians in the United States are lower than average for physicians, with the average being $234,000. However, when faced with debt from medical school, most medical students are opting for the higher-paying specialties. Potential ways to increase the number of medical students entering family practice include providing relief from medical education debt through loan-repayment programs and restructuring fee-for-service reimbursement for health care services. Family physicians are trained to manage acute and chronic health issues for an individual simultaneously, yet their appointment slots may average only ten minutes.

In addition to facing a shortage of personnel, physicians in family medicine experience some of the highest rates of burnout among medical specialties, at 47 percent.

=== Current practice ===
Most family physicians in the US practice in solo or small-group private practices or as hospital employees in practices of similar sizes owned by hospitals. However, the specialty is broad and allows for a variety of career options including education, emergency medicine or urgent care, inpatient medicine, international or wilderness medicine, public health, sports medicine, and research. Others choose to practice as consultants to various medical institutions, including insurance companies.

== United Kingdom ==
=== History of general practice services ===
The pattern of services in the UK was largely established by the National Insurance Act 1911 which established the list system which came from the friendly societies across the country. Every patient was entitled to be on the list, or panel of a general practitioner. In 1911 that only applied to those who paid National insurance contributions. In 1938, 43% of the adult population was covered by a panel doctor. When the National Health Service was established in 1948 this extended to the whole population. The practice would be responsible for the patient record which was kept in a "Lloyd George envelope" and would be transferred if necessary to another practice if the patient changed practice. In the UK, unlike many other countries, patients do not normally have direct access to hospital consultants and the GP controls access to secondary care.

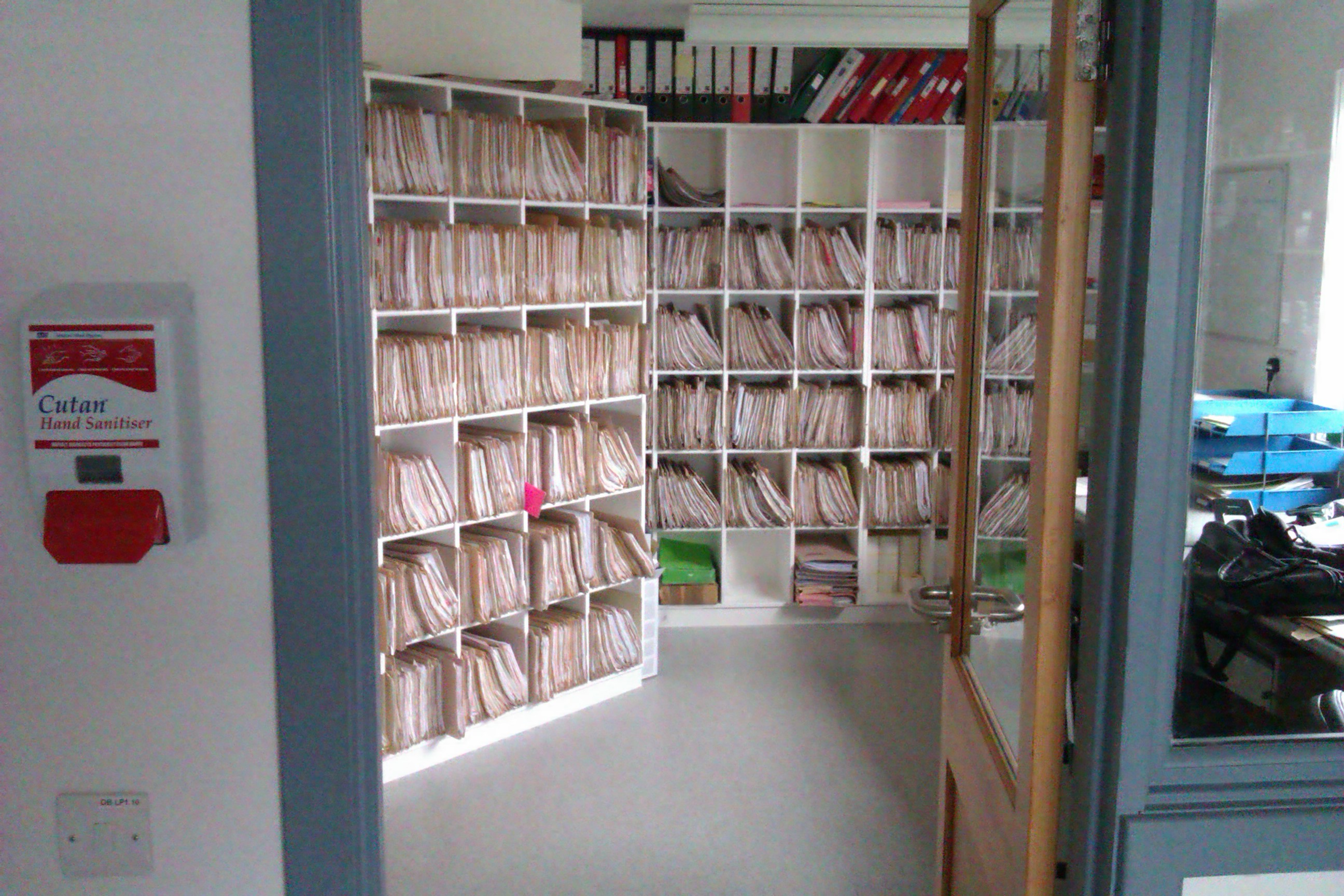
Paper based patient records at Whalsay Health Centre 2012

Practices were generally small, often single handed, operating from the doctor's home and often with the doctor's wife acting as a receptionist. When the NHS was established in 1948 there were plans for the building of health centres, but few were built.

In 1953, general practitioners were estimated to be making between 12 and 30 home visits each day and seeing between 15 and 50 patients in their surgeries.

=== Current practice ===
Today, the services are provided under the General Medical Services Contract, which is regularly revised.

599 GP practices closed between 2010–11 and 2014–15, while 91 opened and average practice list size increased from 6,610 to 7,171. In 2016 there were 7,613 practices in England, 958 in Scotland, 454 in Wales and 349 in Northern Ireland. There were 7,435 practices in England and the average practice list size in June 2017 was 7,860. There were 1.35 million patients over 85. There has been a great deal of consolidation into larger practices, especially in England. Lakeside Healthcare was the largest practice in England in 2014, with 62 partners and more than 100,000 patients. Maintaining general practices in isolated communities has become very challenging, and calls on very different skills and behaviour from that required in large practices where there is increasing specialization. By 1 October 2018, 47 GP practices in England had a list size of 30,000 or more and the average list size had reached 8,420. In 2019 the average number of registered patients per GP in England has risen since 2018 by 56 to 2,087.

The British Medical Association in 2019 conducted a survey for GP premises. About half of the 1,011 respondents thought their surgeries were not suitable for present needs, and 78% said they would not be able to handle expected future demands.

Under the pressure of the Coronavirus epidemic in 2020 general practice shifted very quickly to remote working, something which had been progressing very slowly up to that point. In the Hurley Group Clare Gerada reported that "99% of all our work is now online" using a digital triage system linked to the patient's electronic patient record which processes up to 3000 consultations per hour. Video calling is used to "see" patients if that is needed.

In 2019 according to NHS England, almost 90% of salaried GPs were working part-time.

=== England ===
The GP Forward View, published by NHS England in 2016 promised £2.4 billion (14%) real-terms increase in the budget for general practice. Jeremy Hunt pledged to increase the number of doctors working in general practice by 5,000. There are 3,250 trainee places available in 2017. The GP Career Plus scheme is intended to retain GPs aged over 55 in the profession by providing flexible roles such as providing cover, carrying out specific work such as managing long-term conditions, or doing home visits. In July Simon Stevens announced a programme designed to recruit around 2,000 GPs from the EU and possibly New Zealand and Australia. According to NHS Improvement a 1% deterioration in access to general practice can produce a 10% deterioration in emergency department figures.

GPs are increasingly employing pharmacists to manage the increasingly complex medication regimes of an aging population. In 2017 more than 1,061 practices were employing pharmacists, following the rollout of NHS England's Clinical Pharmacists in General Practice programme. There are also moves to employ care navigators, sometimes an enhanced role for a receptionist, to direct patients to different services such as pharmacy and physiotherapy if a doctor is not needed. In September 2017 270 trained care navigators covering 64,000 patients had been employed across Wakefield. It was estimated that they had saved 930 GP hours over a 10-month trial.

Four NHS trusts: Northumbria Healthcare NHS Foundation Trust; Yeovil District Hospital NHS Foundation Trust; Royal Wolverhampton NHS Trust; and Southern Health NHS Foundation Trust have taken over multiple GP practices in the interests of integration.

GP Federations have become popular among English general practitioners.

In 2026 the cost of general practice in England amounted to about £219 per patient per year, 8.3% of the NHS budget.

==== Consultations ====
According to the Local Government Association 57 million GP consultations in England in 2015 were for minor conditions and illnesses, 5.2 million of them for blocked noses. According to the King's Fund between 2014 and 2017 the number of telephone and face-to-face contacts between patients and GPs rose by 7.5% although GP numbers have stagnated. The mean consultation length in the UK has increased steadily over time from around 5 minutes in the 1950s to around 9·22 minutes in 2013–2014. This is shorter than the mean consultation length in a number of other developed countries around the world.

The proportion of patients in England waiting longer than seven days to see a GP rose from 12.8% in 2012 to 20% in 2017. There were 307 million GP appointments, about a million each working day, with more on Mondays, in the year from November 2017. 40% got a same-day appointment. 2.8 million patients, 10.3%, in October 2018, compared to 9.4% in November 2017, did not see the doctor until at least 21 days after they had booked their appointment, and 1.4 million waited for more than 28 days. More than a million people each month failed to turn up for their appointment.

Commercial providers are rare in the UK but a private GP service was established at Poole Road Medical Centre in Bournemouth in 2017 where patients can pay to skip waiting lists to see a doctor.

GP at Hand, an online service using Babylon Health's app, was launched in November 2017 by the Lillie Road Health Centre, a conventional GP practice in west London. It recruited 7000 new patients in its first month, of which 89.6% were between 20 and 45 years old. The service was widely criticized by GPs for cherry picking. Patients with long term medical conditions or who might need home visits were actively discouraged from joining the service. Richard Vautrey warned that it risked 'undermining the quality and continuity of care and further fragmenting the service provided to the public'.

The COVID-19 pandemic in the United Kingdom led to a sudden move to remote working. In March 2020 the proportion of telephone appointments increased by over 600%.

==== Patient satisfaction ====
85% of patients rate their overall experience of primary care as good in 2016, but practices run by limited companies operating on APMS contracts (a small minority) performed worse on four out of five key indicators - frequency of consulting a preferred doctor, ability to get a convenient appointment, rating of doctor communication skills, ease of contacting the practice by telephone and overall experience.

=== Northern Ireland ===
There have been particularly acute problems in general practice in Northern Ireland as it has proved very difficult to recruit doctors in rural practices. The British Medical Association collected undated resignation letters in 2017 from GPs who threatened to leave the NHS and charge consultation fees. They demanded increased funding, more recruitment and improved computer systems.

A new GP contract was announced in June 2018 by the Northern Ireland Department of Health. It included funding for practice-based pharmacists, an extra £1 million for increased indemnity costs, £1.8 million because of population growth, and £1.5 million for premises upgrades.

== Ireland ==
In Ireland there are about 2,500 General Practitioners working in group practices, primary care centres, single practices and health centres.

== Australia ==
General Practice services in Australia are funded under the Medicare Benefits Scheme (MBS) which is a public health insurance scheme. Australians need a referral from the GP to be able to access specialist care. Most general practitioners work in a general practitioner practice (GPP) with other GPs supported by practice nurses and administrative staff. There is a move to incorporate other health professionals such as pharmacists in to general practice to provide an integrated multidisciplinary healthcare team to deliver primary care.

== India ==
Family medicine (FM) came to be recognized as a medical specialty in India only in the late 1990s. According to the National Health Policy – 2002, there is an acute shortage of specialists in family medicine. As family physicians play a very important role in providing affordable and universal health care to people, the Government of India is now promoting the practice of family medicine by introducing post-graduate training through DNB (Diplomate National Board) programs.

There is a severe shortage of postgraduate training seats, causing a lot of struggle, hardship and a career bottleneck for newly qualified doctors just passing out of medical school. The Family Medicine Training seats should ideally fill this gap and allow more doctors to pursue family medicine careers. However, the uptake, awareness and development of this specialty is slow.

Although family medicine is sometimes called general practice, they are not identical in India. A medical graduate who has successfully completed the Bachelor of Medicine, Bachelor of Surgery (MBBS), course and has been registered with Indian Medical Council or any state medical council is considered a general practitioner. A family physician, however, is a primary care physician who has completed specialist training in the discipline of family medicine.

The Medical Council of India requires three-year residency for family medicine specialty, leading to the award of Doctor of Medicine (MD) in Family Medicine or Diplomate of National Board (DNB) in Family Medicine.

The National Board of Examinations conducts family medicine residency programmes at the teaching hospitals that it accredits. On successful completion of a three-year residency, candidates are awarded Diplomate of National Board (Family Medicine). The curriculum of DNB (FM) comprises: (1) medicine and allied sciences; (2) surgery and allied sciences; (3) maternal and child health; (4) basic sciences and community health. During their three-year residency, candidates receive integrated inpatient and outpatient learning. They also receive field training at community health centres and clinics.

The Medical Council of India permits accredited medical colleges (medical schools) to conduct a similar residency programme in family medicine. On successful completion of three-year residency, candidates are awarded Doctor of Medicine (Family Medicine). A few of the AIIMS institutes have also started a course called MD in community and family medicine in recent years. Even though there is an acute shortage of qualified family physicians in India, further progress has been slow.

The Indian Medical Association's College of General Practitioners, offers a one-year Diploma in Family Medicine (DFM), a distance education programme of the Postgraduate Institute of Medicine, University of Colombo, Sri Lanka, for doctors with minimum five years of experience in general practice. Since the Medical Council of India requires three-year residency for family medicine specialty, these diplomas are not recognized qualifications in India.

As India's need for primary and secondary levels of health care is enormous, medical educators have called for systemic changes to include family medicine in the undergraduate medical curriculum. Some projects like "Buzurgo Ka Humsafar" aid in the growing need for primary care by conducting social awareness workshops and adult vaccination camps.

Recently, the residency-trained family physicians have formed the Academy of Family Physicians of India (AFPI). AFPI is the academic association of family physicians with formal full-time residency training (DNB Family Medicine) in Family medicine. Currently there are about two hundred family medicine residency training sites accredited by the National Board of Examination India, providing around 700 training posts annually. However, there are various issues like academic acceptance, accreditation, curriculum development, uniform training standards, faculty development, research in primary care, etc. in need of urgent attention for family medicine to flourish as an academic specialty in India. The government of India has declared Family Medicine as focus area of human resource development in health sector in the National Health Policy 2002 There is discussion ongoing to employ multi-skilled doctors with DNB family medicine qualification against specialist posts in NRHM (National Rural Health Mission).

Three possible models of how family physicians will practise their specialty in India might evolve, namely (1) private practice, (2) practising at primary care clinics/hospitals, (3) practising as consultants at secondary/tertiary care hospitals.

=== British model ===
A group of 15 doctors based in Birmingham have set up a social enterprise company - Pathfinder Healthcare - which plans to build eight primary health centres in India on the British model of general practice. According to Dr Niti Pall, primary health care is very poorly developed in India. These centres will be run commercially. Patients will be charged ₹200 to 300 for an initial consultation, and prescribed only generic drugs, dispensed from attached pharmacies.

== Japan ==
Family medicine was first recognized as specialty in 2015 and currently has approximately 500 certified family doctors. The Japanese government has made a commitment to increase the number of family doctors in an effort to improve the cost-effectiveness and quality of primary care in light of increasing health care costs. The Japan Primary Care Association (JPCA) is currently the largest academic association of family doctors in Japan. The JPCA family medicine training scheme consists of a three-year programme following the two-year internship. The Japanese Medical Specialty Board define the standard of the specialty training programme for board-certified family doctors. Japan has a free access healthcare system meaning patients can bypass primary care services. In addition to family medicine specialists Japan also has ~100,000 organ-specialist primary care clinics. The doctors working in these clinics do not typically have formal training in family medicine. In 2012, the mean consultation length in a family medicine clinic was 10.2 minutes. A review literature has recently been published detailing the context, structure, process, and outcome of family medicine in Japan.

== Italy ==
The family physician, also called a general practitioner or primary care physician (in Italian: medico di medicina generale, medico di base, medico di famiglia), is legally qualified as a private freelancer who practices in agreement with the Italian National Health System. He is remunerated in proportion to the number of patients assisted, with a maximum limit of around 1500 patients per physician, as established by law. Until the age of 14 people have the right to choose a pediatrician (in Italuan: pediatra di libera scelta), who is remunerated like the family physician. Any person, including immigrants and homeless people, has the right to choose a unique pediatrician or family physician, and to change it at any moment.

Family physician main tasks are to prescribe drugs, diagnostic tests and specialist examinations, arrange hospitalisation for emergency medicine, and to visit patients at home if they are unable to physically go to his ambulatory room (within the municipality of residence of the doctor's office). In addition, the family doctor issues various certificates with legal validity, such as a disease certificate to justify absences from the workplace and to be paid by the National Institute for Social Security.

They are responsible for the costs of renting or purchasing and running the premises in which they practise, as well as the remuneration of any collaborators such as a secretary or a nurse. Usually, since the early 2000s, family doctors have worked in associated clinic romms where there are multiple general practitioners and sometimes also specialists, in order to provide a better healthcare service and to share and limit the impact of operating expenses.

The family doctor has a six-year degree in medicine, which is common to hospital doctors, out-of-hours service physicians and all medical specialities. At the end of this, he is obliged to attend a three-year specialisation course in general medicine that includes theoretical and practical activities (first aid, local emergency services, paediatrics, work experience in a general medical practice already operating in the relevant area.) and a final thesis.

While the six-year degree in medicine must be obtained from a public university, the three-year specialisation is provided by the professional association. Both of them are limited to a fixed maximum number of annual inscriptions.

== Relevant research journals ==
For a specific, and more broadly focused list of journals publishing on research and other topcs related to family practice, see the listing at resurchify.com, which include some of the following:

- American Family Physician
- Annals of Family Medicine
- Archives of Family Medicine
- Canadian Family Physician
- European Journal of General Practice
- Family Medicine, from the STFM
- Family Practice (Oxford)
- Family Practice Management
- Journal of Family Practice
- Journal of the American Board of Family Medicine

== See also ==
- ATC codes – Anatomical Therapeutic Chemical Classification System
- Classification of Pharmaco-Therapeutic Referrals
- General practice
- ICD-10 – International Classification of Diseases
- ICPC-2 PLUS
- International Classification of Primary Care ICPC-2
- Primary care
- Referral (medicine)
- Walk-in clinic
