= List of Chihayafuru characters =

Below is the list of characters in Chihayafuru, a manga series, set in the world of competitive karuta, by Yuki Suetsugu whose story has been adapted into novels, animated series and live action films.

== Main characters ==
Chihaya Ayase (綾瀬 千早, Ayase Chihaya)
Voiced by: Asami Seto (Japanese); Luci Christian (English)
Portrayed by: Suzu Hirose, Kokoro Kuge (ja:久家心, Kuge Kokoro) (young)
A determined high school girl who was inspired by Arata in elementary school to play karuta and to dream of becoming the "Queen" of karuta. She begins a karuta club at her high school with Taichi. She is first introduced to competitive karuta by her childhood friend, Arata. Karuta has remained as Chihaya's passion despite being separated from Arata. She has an exceptional hearing ability that gives her an advantage in playing karuta. While she is exceptionally beautiful, she is considered too weird, her classmates referring to her as a "beauty in vain". She is crazy about karuta (her friends calls her "karuta baka"), to the point that she can be oblivious to other people's feelings. She is super dense. Chihaya is the captain of Mizusawa Karuta Club. She works very hard at improving her karuta skills, and reaches Class A near the beginning of the series. She is a strong, passionate person who loves karuta and is dedicated to her teammates and friends. Chihaya shares a strong bond of trust and friendship with Taichi and appreciates his skill in leading the club, though oblivious towards his feelings for her. Eventually both Arata and Taichi confess that they have feelings for her and though she admitted to herself rather ardently that she will "always love Karuta and Arata" she does yet know how she feels for Taichi. However, she rejects Taichi's confession saying "gomen" (sorry) and he decides to quit the Karuta club. This leaves a massive hole in both their dynamics as team (they are missing a president) and in Chihaya's heart. She feels immense guilt for unintentionally hurting him which forces her to almost quit Karuta. However she powers through without him leading to the high-school tournament. There she finally plays the match with Arata and she wins against him. Thereby her initial goal of being someone worthy to "sit in front of Arata" before she can be with him is no longer an obstacle. Sometime before the Meijin and Queen matches, Chihaya finally responds to Arata's confession. She tells him that she is currently focusing on being queen. He is understanding and tells her he will "try again" once he reaches Tokyo. However, during the Queen match Chihaya has some very powerful revelations about her feelings towards Taichi (who is currently avoiding watching Chihaya and Arata play). However, though it was subtly building up, like Chihaya hallucinating Taichi at omi shrine, it is not until the "Su" card is read that Chihaya finally verbalizes that Taichi has "always been there" – the person who was working hard beside her. Chihaya finally wins the title of Queen alongside Arata. However, she does not confess to either of them at that moment. It is not until arrives spring that Chihaya returns to the clubroom and confesses her feelings towards Taichi- in a simple but poignant way. In chapter 247, the final chapter of Chihayafuru, Chihaya and Taichi have started dating.
Taichi Mashima (真島 太一, Mashima Taichi)
Voiced by: Mamoru Miyano, Ayahi Takagaki (young) (Japanese); Adam Gibbs, Chelsea McCurdy (young) (English)
Portrayed by: Shuhei Nomura, Eru Yamada (ja:山田瑛瑠, Yamada Eru) (young)
A good-looking, all-rounded sportsman and Chihaya's childhood best friend. Who has a strict mother that tells him that he should stick to activities he can win at. Taichi Mashima is an intelligent boy from a rich family who is very popular amongst the kids at their elementary school. He is almost instantly good at everything he does and is referred to in the series as a "Jack of all trades, master of none". When Arata transfers to his class, he dislikes him immediately and starts bullying him for being "weird" and poor. Though, later, we learn that he was doing so due to his own insecurity and because he was jealous of all the attention that was thrown at him by Chihaya (whom he had a crush on). It is when he is challenged to play Karuta against Arata that he is so terrified of losing to the eternal Meijin's grandson and disappointing his mother who expects him to excel, that he decides to hide Arata's glasses. Thereby securing himself a victory. However, though Arata tries to play without his glasses, he is completely unable to play at his usual level. Seeing this, Chihaya steps in to play for Arata (and for herself) and she wins against Taichi. Chihaya never suspected that Taichi was the one that hid Arata's glasses. Eventually out of guilt, Taichi returns them to Arata, begging him not to tell Chihaya, and Arata agrees but calls him a coward. He holds onto Arata's words for the entire series as he tries to prove to himself that he isn't one. During the high school arc, Taichi attends the same high school as Chihaya, whom he hasn't met since middle school, but Chihaya asks if Taichi still plays Karuta. He says only casually, but she begs him to watch her get to A class where he reluctantly decides to make a Karuta club with her. However, in part, he decided to make a club with Chihaya because it looks fun, and he saw the potential in Chihaya, so he wants to help her accomplish her dream. His primary goal is winning a match against Arata. Taichi is the president of the Mizusawa Karuta club. Throughout the two years of high school, Taichi learns how to be a team leader and also becomes close friends with everyone on the team, especially Nishida and Komano. Taichi too has grown a lot as a Karuta player, for instance, making it into A class (One of his primary hurdles at the start of the series). Taichi has an incredible memory and can remember every single card that has been read. However, this skill is a double-edged sword; due to his strong memory, occasionally it makes it difficult for him to forget placements of previous/current matches. However, despite constant bouts of bad luck, he always manages to pick himself back up and keep trying. One of his biggest weaknesses as a player is himself – he always gets into his head and has very low self-esteem, nearly always thinking the worst about himself and thinking that people also think the worst of him. Though the Mizusawa team won the national high school tournament, Taichi desperately wants to win a match against Chihaya. When he loses against her in Yoshino, he starts a downward trajectory where his grades begin to slip, and he starts participating in tournaments away from Chihaya. After learning that Arata has confessed his feelings and subsequently losing to him in a match, Taichi is at an all-time low. Chihaya does her best to make him smile, but no matter what she does it's still not enough. Taichi finally gathers his courage and confesses to Chihaya about stealing Arata's glasses when they were kids, thereby choosing to no longer be a coward. He confessed that he loves Chihaya, and she replied sorry, which he takes as a rejection and storms out. Taichi quits the club but decides not to give up Karuta fully. He later developed an unlikely mentor-friend relationship with Hisashi Suou- the current reigning Meijin. Suou teaches Taichi not only how to improve his hearing, but he also develops a cruel style of Karuta – one where you trick your opponents into making faults. After his rejection, Taichi avoids Chihaya at all costs. But when the high school tournament is on, and Chihaya will be playing against Arata, he decides to finally go back and watch them. It is a heartfelt reunion with the Mizusawa team. Taichi gives Arata a box of chocolates attached with a note that they will meet again in a match. To Chihaya's delight, Taichi returns to play to become the challenger for the West. He uses his newfound skills from Suou to win the challenger matches, even winning against his sensei, Harada. At the challenger matches, he plays against Arata once again. He tries to adopt Suou's detached Karuta, that doesn't care about winning or losing. In the first match, Taichi is close to losing, but he finally gets a card against Arata. Arata claims that it was his card and because Taichi is trying to remain detached, and even though both of them know Taichi got it first, he lets it go. Arata feels guilty about lying about the take, so he offers Taichi anything to make up for it. Taichi tells him that the only way he can is if they are in a battle of fates, Arata will let Taichi win no matter which card is called. In the second match, because he wants to take the Chiha card from Arata more than anything, Taichi gets the upper hand; thereby rejecting Suou's empty Karuta. It is another battle of fates but true to his word, Arata lets Taichi take the last card, and Taichi won the second round. However, in the final match due to exhaustion and perhaps feeling like he accomplished his dream of winning against Arata, Taichi loses by 18 cards. However, Arata tells Taichi that he never saw him as a burden and thanks him for playing Karuta with him for all these years even though he wasn't as skilled as him. They both hug as Chihaya cries bitter tears for Taichi's loss. Taichi does not want to watch Arata and Chihaya play in their Meijin and Queen matches in the Omi Jingu, because he thinks it doesn't matter to either of them if he's there or not. However, he does bring Suou's family out to watch him which forces him to travel to Omi Jingu. Eventually, he does decide to go and watch Chihaya, and he witnesses both Arata and Chihaya take the Chiha card. This inspires him to start practicing his swings outside in the hallway. Sumire convinces Taichi to watch as both Chihaya and Arata win the title of Meijin and Queen. He is happy for his friends achieving their dreams, however, he still feels like he is the one who is being left behind, and he also thinks that Chihaya and Arata make a great pair believing that the two of them would end up together. His arc culminates with him finally challenging Arata the next year, and both Chihaya and Arata race down the stairs to hug him. At the end of the story, Taichi decides to move to Kyoto for a fresh start, and though Chihaya is sad that he is moving, he tells her that they will always meet again through Karuta. Thereby, he still promised her that they would continue to be friends even though she did not love him back. However, realizing this is not enough, Chihaya confesses that she is in love with him. At first, he is bewildered, but then he accepts, in chapter 247 of Chihayafuru, Chihaya and Taichi have started dating.
Arata Wataya (綿谷 新, Wataya Arata)
Voiced by: Yoshimasa Hosoya, Yuka Terasaki (young) (Japanese); Blake Shepard, Shannon Emerick (young) (English)
Portrayed by: Mackenyu, Amon Kabe (ja:加部亜門, Kabe Amon) (young)
Arata Wataya was a transfer student to Chihaya's elementary school, grandchild of an eternal master karuta player, Arata inspires Chihaya to take up karuta. He has difficulty fitting in at Chihaya's elementary school because of his Fukui dialect and passion for karuta, but Chihaya befriends him. His dream is to become a karuta Meijin. After graduating elementary school, he returns to Fukui to care for his grandfather. After returning to Fukui, he quits karuta because his grandfather died while Arata was competing in a karuta tournament to rise to A-rank. However, after Chihaya and Taichi visit him in Fukui, he regains his resolve to play competitive karuta again. He has beaten "The Queen" Shinobu Wakamiya and is aiming to beat "Master" Hishashi Suo to claim the position of "Master". Arata cherishes his friendship with both Chihaya and Taichi, albeit romantically to Chihaya. Later in the manga, Arata confesses his love to Chihaya, also informing her of his move back to Tokyo. Arata then excuses himself, leaving Chihaya flustered and speechless.

== Mizusawa High School Karuta Club ==
Kanade Ōe (大江 奏, Ōe Kanade)
Voiced by: Ai Kayano (Japanese); Juliet Simmons (English)
Portrayed by: Mone Kamishiraishi
A girl with a taste for the classics, Kanade is a quiet girl who works in a kimono store and loves all kinds of traditional clothing. She is quite knowledgeable about the true meanings behind the One Hundred Poems and joins the karuta club on the condition that they start wearing hakama. Her dream is to become an official reader and be able to read for Chihaya's Queen match. She knows that Taichi has feelings for Chihaya and tells him to do his best.
Yūsei Nishida (西田 優征, Nishida Yūsei)
Voiced by: Tōru Nara (Japanese); Greg Ayres (English)
Portrayed by: Yuma Yamoto
A rather tubby boy who is reluctantly often called 'Porky' (肉まんくん, Nikuman-kun; lit. Steamed meat bun) by Chihaya. Once a top karuta player who had previously played against Chihaya, Arata and Taichi in an elementary school tournament, Yūsei quit karuta after suffering a defeat against Arata and took up tennis as a refuge. However, Chihaya manages to remind him how he used to play for fun and he ends up joining the karuta club. While he is talented in karuta, focusing on a defensive style, he gets shaken up really easily.
Tsutomu Komano (Desktomu) (駒野 勉, Komano Tsutomu)
Voiced by: Tsubasa Yonaga (Japanese); Bryson Baugus (English)
Portrayed by: Yuki Morinaga
An intelligent boy in Chihaya's class who is second only to Taichi in test scores. Often tied to his desk and anti-social, he feels that nothing is worth doing unless it makes you smarter. However, Chihaya and Taichi help to convince him that karuta involves a lot of strategy and he joins the club. As the progress within the series, Tsutomu has improved social skill to his teammates, especially Kanade. He is now the karuta strategist of the team, taking down notes in every game.
Sumire Hanano (花野 菫, Hanano Sumire)
Voiced by: Megumi Han (Japanese); Maggie Flecknoe (English)
Played by: Mio Yuki
A girl who joins the Karuta Club at the start of Chihaya's second year. Having been dumped by her boyfriend on the first day of school, she becomes desperate to find a new boyfriend and immediately develops a crush on Taichi, which he does not return. Sumire initially joins the club in order to get close to Taichi, but after she inadvertently told that to the club members, she was convinced by Kanade to stay and devote herself to karuta. Her feelings for Taichi become genuine as she spends more time around him. She even stands up to Taichi's mother, who wanted to stop him from competing in a karuta tournament. Although she is new to the game, she tends to show strong emotions when reading poems.
Akihiro Tsukuba (筑波 秋博, Tsukuba Akihiro)
Voiced by: Miyu Irino (Japanese); Gareth West (English)
Played by: Hayato Sano
A boy who joins the Karuta Club at the start of Chihaya's second year. He is originally from Hokkaido and is a master at playing second verse karuta using two hands. He joins the club to learn how to play first verse karuta. He comes from a family who is attracted to pretty people, and has three younger brothers who admire him. At the beginning, he would sometimes do sneaky acts (such as changing the order of his teammates before games) so that he could show off his skills in front of his brothers. He and his brothers admire Chihaya for both her playing skills and beauty, and several instances show that he has a small crush on Chihaya.
Taeko Miyauchi (宮内 妙子, Miyauchi Taeko)
Voiced by: Toshiko Fujita (season 1-2), Yoshino Ohtori (season 3) (Japanese); Vicki Barosh (English)
Portrayed by: Miyuki Matsuda
Nicknamed "Empress", she is the advisor of the Karuta Club and also the homeroom teacher of Ayase and Tsutomu. Although initially unreceptive to Karuta, she gradually warms up when she witness how serious the club members are playing Karuta.

== Meijin and Queen ==
Shinobu Wakamiya (若宮 詩暢, Wakamiya Shinobu)
Voiced by: Mihoko Nakamichi (Japanese); Kira Vincent-Davis (English)
Portrayed by: Mayu Matsuoka
The primary antagonist of the Chihayafuru series.
The current Queen of Karuta, the national champion of the women's division, she is also the youngest Queen in history. When she was younger there was this girl that was a close Karuta friend, but because Shinobu was very skilled in Karuta she wasn't allowed to play Karuta with kids her age. She was always isolated from others.
Hisashi Suō (周防 久志, Suō Hisashi)
Voiced by: Hiroki Tōchi (Japanese); David Matranga (English)
The current Meijin of Karuta, the national champion of the men's division. He began karuta in college, and took three years to take the title of Meijin. He has since defended the title 5 times. His favourite food is sweets.

== Shiranami Karuta Society ==
Hideo Harada (原田 秀雄, Harada Hideo)
Voiced by: Unshō Ishizuka (season 1-2), Kenta Miyake (season 3) (Japanese); James Belcher (English)
Portrayed by: Jun Kunimura
Chairman of the Shiranami Karuta Society. Harada provides karuta instruction in Fuchū, Tokyo. In elementary school Chihaya, Taichi and Arata develop their karuta skills and form their first team under Harada's supervision. Throughout the series he is a karuta mentor as well as a confidant who teaches his pupils life lessons. An accomplished karuta competitor Harada participates at the highest levels in karuta tournaments. In the manga and the anime he is a medical doctor who runs the Harada Clinic of Internal Medicine and Paediatrics. In the live action trilogy Harada's profession is Kannushi, or Shinto priest who operates a Shinto shrine.
Hiroshi Tsuboguchi (坪口 広史, Tsuboguchi Hiroshi)
Voiced by: Kenji Takahashi (Japanese); Benjamin McLaughlin (English)
Ace of the Shiranami Karuta Society. Made it to the Meijin Challenger Finals as the Eastern Representative but lost to his opponent. Currently the advisor for Homei High School Karuta Team.
Fuyumasa Tsukuba (筑波 冬政, Tsukuba Fuyumasa), Haruomi Tsukuba (筑波 春臣, Tsukuba Haruomi), Natsufusa Tsukuba (筑波 夏総, Tsukuba Natsufusa)
Voiced by: Chika Anzai, Naoko Sugiura and Megumi Satou (Japanese); Katelyn Barr, Carli Mosier, and Carolyn Medrano (English)
Tsukuba Akihiro's younger brothers.

== Suihoku Karuta Society ==
Akio Kitano (北野昌夫, Kitano Akio)
Voiced by: Kensuke Satou (Japanese); Steve Fenley (English)
Chairman of Suihoku Karuta Society. He has a deep-seated rivalry with Hidehiro Harada.
Yumi Yamamoto (山本 由美, Yamamoto Yumi)
Voiced by: Yuko Kaida (Japanese); Courtney Lomelo (English)
A, one time, Queen of Karuta, who lost the title to Shinobu Wakamiya. After her defeat, Yamamoto continues her participation in competitive karuta as the strongest representative of Suihoku. At twenty-four years of age she works as a bank teller. Prior to attaining the national women's title, Yamamoto's karuta gamesmanship involved contesting decisions with opponents. As former Queen she resumes her card challenging arguments during a heated match against Chihaya, whom she defeats to progress to the next round of the Eastern Japan qualifiers. That year Yamamoto is ultimately defeated, as the national challenger, by reigning champion Shinobu Wakamiya. At Shuihoku Karuta Society, Yamamoto provides advice and guidance to up-and-coming members, such as Tomihara West High School student Setsuna Hayami.

== Nagumo Karuta Society ==
Isami Kuriyama (栗山 勇, Kuriyama Isami)
Voiced by: Yuya Murakami (Japanese); Ty Mahany (English)
Chairman of Fukui Nagumo Karuta Society.
Murao Shinichi (村尾 慎一, Shinichi Murao)
Voiced by: Yuji Ueda (Japanese); Adam Noble (English)
A-Class member of Fukui Nagumo Karuta Society. Always practices with Arata.
Daisuke (大輔, Daisuke)
Voiced by: Chika Anzai (Japanese); Rachel Landon (English)
Member of Fukui Nagumo Karuta Society who is still in elementary school.

== Myoujou Karuta Society ==
Ise Daijiro (伊勢 大二郎, Daijiro Ise)
Voiced by: Daichi Endo (Japanese); Jack Ivy (English)
Chairman of Kyoto Myojo Karuta Society, where Wakamiya Shinobu used to play at.
Yuikawa (結川, Yuikawa)
Satoko (さとこ, Satoko)
Voiced by: Chika Anzai (Japanese); Carolyn Medrano (English)
Shinobu's childhood friend.
Ryusei (りゅうせい, Ryusei)

== Hokuo High School ==
Akito Sudo (須藤 暁人, Sudo Akito)
Voiced by: Takashi Ohara (Japanese); Mike Yager (English)
Portrayed by: Hiroya Shimizu

Nayuta Amakasu (甘糟 那由太, Amakasu Nayuta)
Voiced by: Takako Honda (Japanese); Brittney Karbowski (English)

Hiro Kinashi (木梨 浩, Kinashi Hiro)
Voiced by: Kazuya Nakai (Japanese); Kyle Jones (English)
Portrayed by: Ryotaro Sakaguchi

Takuma (宅間, Takuma)
Voiced by: Yuya Murakami (Japanese); Scott Gibbs (English)

Ryugasaki (竜ヶ崎, Ryugasaki)
Voiced by: Tōru Higuchichi (Japanese); Johnny De La Cerda (English)

Koki Shiroyama (城山 浩希, Shiroyama Koki)
Voiced by: Masayuki Kato (Japanese); Joel McCray (English)

Seihisa Kameda (亀田 精久, Kameda Seihisa)
Voiced by: Yuichi Karasuma (Japanese); Ned Gayle (English)

Futoshi Mochida (持田 太, Mochida Futoshi)
Voiced by: Daisuke Sakaguchi (Japanese); Jack Ivy (English)
Advisor of Hokuo High School Karuta Club.

== Fujisaki High School ==
Ryoga Emuro (江室 凌雅, Emuro Ryoga)
Voiced by: Yūki Ono (Japanese); Houston Hayes (English)

Yoshihiko Hiyuuga (日向 良彦, Hiyuuga Yoshihiko)

Makoto Yamai (山井 真琴, Yamai Makoto)
Voiced by: Mitsuki Saiga (Japanese); Clint Bickham (English)

Mitsuki Ichimura (市村 充輝, Ichimura Mitsuki)
Voiced by: Shigeyuki Suzaki (Japanese); Kory Getman (English)
Rion Yamashiro (山城 理音, Yamashiro Rion)
Voiced by: Ayahi Takagaki (Japanese); Katelyn Barr (English)

Kanata Suzuki (鈴木 奏太, Suzuki Kanata) and Manata Suzuki (鈴木 真太, Suzuki Manata)
Voiced by: Susumu Chiba (Japanese); Anthony Hunter (Kanata), Joe Daniels (Manata) (English)

Toda (戸田, Toda)
Voiced by: Ryota Asari

Hayashida (林田, Hayashida)
Voiced by: Chika Anzai (Japanese); Alexandra Bedford (English)

Midori Sakurazawa (桜沢 翠, Sakurazawa Midori)
Voiced by: Megumi Hayashibara (Japanese); Stephanie Wittels (English)
Advisor of the Fujisaki High School Karuta Club.

== Akashi First Girls' School ==
Megumu Osaka (逢坂 恵夢, Ousaka Megumu)
Voiced by: Sachi Matsumoto (Japanese); Allison Sumrall (English)

Keiko Yuube (夕部 慶子, Yuube Keiko)
Voiced by: Junko Kitanishi (Japanese); Natalie Rial (English)

Nene Hayasaka (早坂 寧々, Hayasaka Nene)
Voiced by: Yoko Nishino (Japanese); Brittney Karbowski (English)
Natsuki Tanimura (谷村 夏樹, Tanimura Natsuki)
Voiced by: Chika Anzai (Japanese); Natalie Jones (English)
Daigorou Minami (南 大吾郎, Minami Daigorou)
Voiced by: Kosuke Takaguchi (Japanese); Jay Hickman (English)
Advisor of the Karuta Club.

== Shoyo High School ==
Zui Kawabe (川辺 穂, Kawabe Zui)
Haruto Tashiro (田代 晴人, Tashiro Haruto)
Voiced by: Kenta Okuma (Japanese); Ricardo Contreras (English)
Ayane Ooka (大岡 綾音, Ooka Ayane)
Voiced by: Marika Minase (Japanese); Jennifer Challenger (English)
Reo Sano (佐野 礼央, Sano Reo)
Haruki Sanada (真田 春樹, Sanada Haruki)

== Yamaguchi Miyoka High School ==
Manabu Nakayama (中山 学, Nakayama Manabu)
Voiced by: Kensuke Sato (Japanese); Greg Cote (English)
Sosuke Hayashi (林 宗佑, Hayashi Sosuke)
Taichi Toyota (豊田 泰壱, Toyota Taichi)
Makoto Sasaki (佐々木 真, Sasaki Makoto)
Daisuke Tokoro (所 大輔, Tokoro Daisuke)
Tomonori Oikawa (及川 知成, Oikawa Tomonori)
Voiced by: Takanori Hoshino (Japanese); David Wald (English)
Advisor of the Karuta Club.

== Chiba International School of Information Sciences ==
Anthony Sorb (アンソニー・ソーブ, Anthony Sorb)
Voiced by: Shinichiro Miki (Japanese); Kregg Dailey (English)
Napa Payakuarun (ナパー・パヤクアルン, Napa Payakuarun)
Voiced by: Akane Fujita (Japanese); Clint Bickham (English)
Rachel Port (レイチェル・ポート, Rachel Port)
Voiced by: Naoko Sugiura (Japanese); Stephanie Wittels (English)
Park Kyoson (パク・キョソン, Park Kyoson)
Voiced by: Masayuki Kato (Japanese); Scott Gibbs (English)
Matt Rowan (マット・ローワン, Matt Rowan)
Voiced by: Kensuke Sato (Japanese); Andrew Love (English)

== Takechi High School ==
Ryuhei Inoue (井上 龍平, Inoue Ryuhei)
Ayako Tanaka (田中 彩子, Tanaka Ayako)
Miyuki Satokura (郷倉 美幸, Satokura Miyuki)
Katsue Yamashiro (山城 加都恵, Yamashiro Katsue)

== Homei High School ==
Suzuka Sasa (佐々 鈴香, Sasa Suzuka)
Voiced by: Mai Todo (Japanese); Chelsea McCurdy (English)
Mei Toda (戸田 メイ, Toda Mei)
Voiced by: Marika Minase (Japanese); Stephanie Wittels (English)
Eita Takei (武井 永太, Takei Eita)
Voiced by: Yuichi Karasuma (Japanese); Andrew Love (English)
Takatoshi Mori (森 孝利, Mori Takatoshi)
Voiced by: Taisuke Yamamoto (Japanese); Joel McCray (English)
Komazawa (駒沢, Komazawa)

== Tomihara West High School ==
Setsuna Hayami (速水節奈, Hayami Setsuna)
Karuta club member and Japanese calligraphy student, admirer of Ogata Kōrin.
Member of Suihoku Karuta Society, who also participates in individual karuta tournaments outside the high school setting.
Takashi Nagura (名倉 孝, Nagura Takashi)
Voiced by: Takuya Satō
Yuri Nawano (縄野 友里, Nawano Yuri)
Voiced by: Marika Minase
Ayaka Sakura (佐倉 彩夏, Sakura Ayaka)
Voiced by: Nanami Yoshino
Sano (佐野, Sano)
Voiced by: Yuka Hirose
Emi Suda (須田 恵美, Suda Emi)
Voiced by: Yoko Nishino

== Shuryukan High School ==
Makoto Oda (小田 誠, Oda Makoto)
Voiced by: Yuichi Karasuma
Keisuke Ariyoshi (有吉 圭介, Ariyoshi Keisuke)
Nao Mastsumoto (松本 直, Mastsumoto Nao)

== Fukui West High School ==
Shoji Kawauchi (河内 翔二, Kawauchi Shoji)
Voiced by: Masayuki Shoji (Japanese); Kyle Jones (English)
Masaki Ono (大野 柾, Ono Masaki)
Voiced by: Ryota Ohsaka (Japanese); Joel McCray (English)
Tajiri (田尻, Tajiri)

== Jinnan Academy ==
Shogo Kinoshita (木下 誠吾, Kinoshita Shogo)
Voiced by: Hayashi Yuu
Toyo Honma (本間 豊, Honma Toyo)
Voiced by: Meiko Kawasaki
Emi Mayama (真山 恵美, Mayama Emi)
Voiced by: Kiyono Yasuno
Yuuko Natsuwaki (夏脇 由有子, Natsuwaki Yuuko)
Voiced by: Chika Anzai
Fumiko Suzuki (鈴木 富美子, Suzuki Fumiko)
Voiced by: Shoko Tsuda
Advisor of Karuta Club.

== Other competitors ==
Hajime Wataya (綿谷 始, Wataya Hajime)
Voiced by: Kinryu Arimoto (Japanese); Jay Hickman (English)
Played by: Masane Tsukayama
Arata's grandfather, who died before the beginning of the series. He was an excellent karuta player in the past, who gave Arata life lessons whenever he is at a disadvantage.
Keiichi Takemura (武村 敬一, Takemura Keiichi)
1st year Meijin Challenger.
Yasuda (安田, Yasuda)
Voiced by: Tokuyoshi Kawashima (Japanese); Andrew Love (English)
Chihaya's opponent during the match that earned Chihaya her promotion to class A.
Sakura Kanai (金井 桜, Kanai Sakura)
Voiced by: Mika Kanai (Japanese); Hilary Haag (English)
Ririka Tachikawa (立川 梨理華, Tachikawa Ririka)
Voiced by: Ikue Otani (Japanese); Emily Neves (English)
Haruka Inokuma (猪熊 遥, Inokuma Haruka)
Voiced by: Maaya Sakamoto
Maiden name Chihara. Former Queen.
Ruri Hanamoto (花本 瑠璃, Hanamoto Ruri)
Voiced by: Noriko Obata
Natsumi Akita (金子 夏美, Akita Natsumi)
Shusaku Koishikawa (小石川 秀作, Koishikawa Shusaku)

== Readers ==
Kyoko Yamashiro (山城 今日子, Yamashiro Kyoko)
Voiced by: Keiko Serino (Reader), Miyoko Shoji (Japanese); Kaoru Bertrand, Shelley Calene-Black (English)
1 out of 7 Certified Readers. 7 Dan.
Osamu Igarashi (五十嵐 修, Igarashi Osamu)
Voiced by: Javier Lopez (English)
Reader of the CD used for Practice. 7 Dan.
Tashiro (田代, Tashiro)
Voiced by: Ryota Ohsaka (Japanese); Clint Bickham (English)

== Karuta Society Committee Members ==
Yoshioka (吉岡, Yoshioka)
Voiced by: Mitsuru Ogata (Japanese); Kyle Jones (English)
Yoshiaki Mashita (間下 義明, Mashita Yoshiaki)
Voiced by: Masahiko Tanaka (Japanese); Steve Fenley (English)
National Society Chairman. 10 Dan.
Katsuhito Masuoka (増岡 勝人, Masuoka Katsuhito)
Voiced by: Tsuguo Magami (Japanese); John Swasey (English)
High School Competitor Disciplinary Committee Chair. 6 Dan.

== Family members ==
Chitose Ayase (綾瀬 千歳, Ayase Chitose)
Voiced by: Aya Endō (Japanese); Carli Mosier (English)
Portrayed by: Alice Hirose
Chihaya's big sister, who works as a model. She has doubts about her modeling career; but she gets determined again after watching her sister focus on Karuta all the time.
Chieko Ayase (綾瀬 千恵子, Ayase Chieko)
Voiced by: Satsuki Yukino (Japanese); Rachel Landon (English)
Chitose and Chihaya's mother.
Kenji Ayase (綾瀬 健二, Ayase Kenji)
Voiced by: Kenji Hamada (Japanese); Chris Gibson (English)
Chitose and Chihaya's dad.
Reiko Mashima (真島 麗子, Mashima Reiko)
Voiced by: Yuu Shimamura (Japanese); Allison Sumrall (English)
Taichi's mother.
Rika Mashima (真島 梨香, Mashima Rika)
Voiced by: Kiyono Yasuno (Japanese); Tiffany Terrell (English)
Taichi's sister.
Rieko Oe (大江 利恵子, Oe Rieko)
Voiced by: Aya Hisakawa (Japanese); Tiffany Terrell (English)
Kanade's mother.
Mari Wataya (綿谷 麻里, Wataya Mari)
Voiced by: Houko Kuwashima (Japanese); Katelyn Barr (English)
Arata's mother.
Akira Wataya (綿谷 彰, Wataya Akira)
Voiced by: Hitoshi Horikawa (Japanese); Jay Hickman (English)
Arata's dad.
Shiho Wakamiya (若宮 詩穂, Wakamiya Shiho)
Shinobu's mother.
Shinobu's Grandmother (詩暢の祖母, Shinobu's Grandmother)
Kyoto Diet representative.
Yukari Nishida (西田 優華璃, Nishida Yukari)
Voiced by: Miho Hino (Japanese); Greg Ayres (English)
Yusei's elder sister.

== Other characters from Misuzawa High School ==
Michiru Horikawa (堀川 みちる, Horikawa Michiru)
Voiced by: Miho Hino
Yamakawa (山川, Yamakawa)
Voiced by: Yuya Murakami
Matsuda (松田, Matsuda)
Hinako Mano (真野 陽菜子, Mano Hinako)
Voiced by: Kiyono Yasuno
Shori Miyazaki (宮崎 詩織, Miyazaki Shori)
Voiced by: Chika Anzai
Tokiji Fukasaku (深作 時次, Fukasaku Tokiji)
Voiced by: Daichi Endo
Shibata (柴田, Shibata)
Voiced by: Takuya Sato
Matoba (的場, Matoba)
Voiced by: Yuuji Ueda (Japanese); Benjamin McLaughlin (English)

== Other characters ==
Yuu (由宇, Yuu)
Voiced by: Chika Anzai (Japanese); Natalie Rial (English)
Arata's neighbour in Fukui.
Katsugi Bookstore Manager (勝義書店店長, Katsugi Bookstore Manager)
Voiced by: Kensuke Sato
Manager of the bookstore where Arata work part-time.
Taichi's Girlfriend (太一の彼女, Taichi's Girlfriend)
Voiced by: Chika Anzai (Japanese); Shanae'a Moore (English)
Sasagu Mori (森 捧, Mori Sasagu)
Voiced by: Yoshimasa Hosoya
Tsukusu Hayashi (林 尽, Hayashi Tsukusu)
Voiced by: Kiyotaka Furushima
Yutaka Kibayashi (木林 豊, Kibayashi Yutaka)
Voiced by: Kensuke Sato
He is a fan of Megumu Osaka.
