= Adolescent health =

Adolescent health, or youth health, is the range of approaches to preventing, detecting or treating young people's health and well-being.

The term adolescent and young people are often used interchangeably, as are the terms Adolescent Health and Youth Health. Young people's health is often complex and requires a comprehensive, biopsychosocial approach.

== Adolescent health risks ==
Because adolescence represents a life stage of increasing psychosocial independence, but one of limited legal and social rights (for those who have not reached the legal age of adulthood where they reside), adolescent health exists at the intersection of many forces often outside of the control of individual young people. Some young people might have a history of adverse childhood experiences (ACEs), or may be actively living in or experiencing the situations described as ACEs. The Adverse Childhood Experiences Study suggests that ACEs are common, and are predictive of adverse physical health outcomes (ischemic heart disease, cancer, chronic lung disease) in adults.

Social, cultural and environmental factors are all important areas of focus in adolescent health. Young people have specific health problems and developmental needs that differ from those of children or adults: The causes of ill-health in adolescents are mostly psychosocial rather than biological. Young people often engage in health risk behaviours that reflect the processes of adolescent development: experimentation and exploration, including using drugs and alcohol, sexual behaviour, and other risk taking that affect their physical and mental health. Adolescent health also encompasses children's and young people's sexual and reproductive health (SRH).

The World Health Organization describes the leading health-related problems in the age group 10 – 19 years to include:

- Road traffic accidents
- Drowning
- Violence
- Alcohol and drugs
- Tobacco
- Mental health
- Communicable disease (such as HIV, Tuberculosis)
- Early pregnancy and childbirth
- Environmental health
- Overweight
- Nutrition
- Physical activity

Young people often lack awareness of the risks of harm associated with certain behaviours, or may overestimate the risks of some behaviours while underestimating the risks of others. They may be in the process of developing protective skills and behaviors, or may lack knowledge about how and where to seek help for their health concerns. By intervening at this early life stage, many chronic conditions later in life can be prevented.

In addition to intervention on young people's knowledge around the risks of health-related behaviors, it is crucial to acknowledge that adolescents under the legal age of majority are often occupying an idiosyncratic legal, economic, and social state, where their rights to access confidential medical services, or to consent to preventative medical care is highly dependent on the laws and practices of where they reside. For example, in the US, the legal rights of minors to consent to screening and treatment for sexually transmitted infections (STIs) varies on a state by state level, and the right to confidential access to these services varies as well. In a majority of US states, a minor may legally consent to testing and treatment starting at age 12 or 14, but 18 US states allow a physician to inform a minor's parents that their child has requested or has received STI screening or treatment if the physician deems it in the patient's best interests. At the same time, adolescents as an age group do not have the same economic power as adults, and may be unable to pay for or transport themselves to medical screening or treatment, whether for physical or behavioral health issues. An emphasis on individual risk behaviors may obfuscate the role of institutional barriers to performing protective health behaviors.

== Key principles ==
Evidence-based practices include harm reduction and health promotion to intervene early in the life course and illness trajectory. Adoption of unhealthy behaviors are evident particularly during life stages involving transition such as the commencement of university where physical inactivity, sedentary activity and poor dietary habits prevail. Youth health is founded on collaborative approaches that address social justice. Youth development approaches include youth empowerment and youth participation. Their aim is to promote youth rights, youth voice and youth engagement.

== Access to health-care services ==
Studies about young people's access to healthcare have identified major barriers including concerns about confidentiality, practitioners attitudes and communication style, environment, availability of services, cost and the developmental characteristics of young people. Marginalised young people can have greater difficulty accessing health services and need support to navigate the health system.

The World Health Organization 'Global standards for quality health-care services for adolescents' include:

- Adolescents' health literacy
- Community support
- Appropriate package of services
- Providers' competencies
- Facility characteristics
- Equity and non-discrimination
- Standard Data and quality improvement
- Adolescents' participation

== Key health services for young people ==
Youth Health includes adolescent medicine as a speciality, along with other primary and tertiary care services. Health services for young people include mental health services, child protection, drug and alcohol services, sexual health services. General Practitioners work alongside multidisciplinary health practitioners including psychology, social Work and Youth health nursing and school health services. Youth work and youth development services support and engage young people. Web based supports, such as Reach Out!, provide early intervention.

Youth health services ('one-stop-shops' for young people) are specialist services providing multi-disciplinary, primary health care to young people. Focusing on engaging disadvantaged young people, they deliver flexible and unique services to young people in relaxed and comfortable youth-friendly environments. Youth health services work in partnership with other government and non-government services. Youth health services provide a range of entry-points and non-threatening services (such as creative arts, basic services such as showers and laundries, a drop in service, sports and recreational facilities), which encourage young people to connect with the service on their own terms. They also provide informal links to other support services and sectors including education, housing, financial support and legal services, offering support to young people who are dealing with complex issues. Youth health services understand the need to respond immediately to young people's requests for support and assistance and they share a common operating philosophy, which values social justice, equity, and a holistic view of young people's health and well-being.

Capacity building organisations support the Youth Health sector by providing access to information and resources, conducting research and providing training.

== Effects of discrimination ==
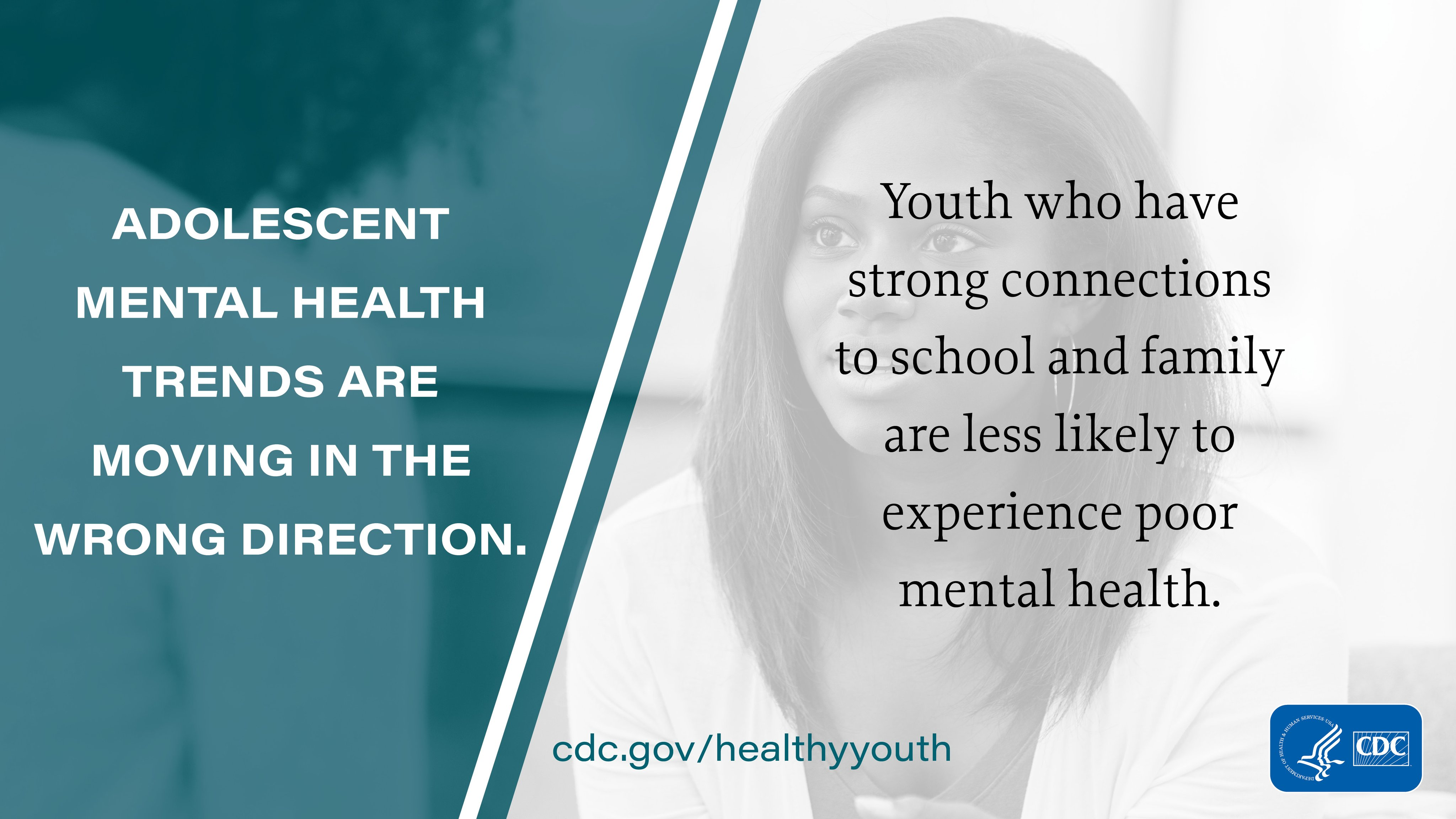
A Centers for Disease Control and Prevention graphic mental health care in adolescents.

=== Social-emotional distress ===
In a comprehensive review of research literature including 126 different studies that analyzed the relationship between perceived discrimination and social-emotional distress with effect sizes from small to moderate, perceived discrimination was shown to correlate with many social-emotional distresses for adolescents (Benner et al., 2018). Additionally, the study found that the more an adolescent perceived they were a victim of discrimination, the more likely it is that they will also report experiences with depression, anxiety, loneliness, and stress.

=== Risky health behaviors ===
Adolescents who report more discrimination also tend to report engaging in more risky health behaviors such as delinquency, anger, and other externalizing behaviors Other risky health behaviors include substance abuse and risky sexual behaviors like unprotected sex and sex with multiple partners. The data was taken from 71 different studies that analyze the relationship between perceived discrimination and risky health behaviors with effect sizes from small to moderate. The relationship between risky health behaviors in adolescents and discrimination can be partially explained by a greater tendency for school administrators to discipline minority students more often and more severely than other students (Mallett, 2016). This increase in discipline can lead to further delinquent and externalizing behaviors as they spend less time in the classroom environment.

=== Academics ===
Perceived discrimination has also been linked to lower academic performance in adolescents. Students who feel they face discrimination are more likely to have lower grade point averages (GPA), more absences, less engagement in class, and lower academic motivation. The data was taken from 73 different studies that analyze the relationship between perceived discrimination and academic outcomes in all areas with small effect sizes. The increased frequency of discipline also takes class time away from students which could contribute to their lowered academic outcomes. With less time in the classroom they do not receive the same amount of instruction that students in the classroom receive.

== Research ==
=== The American teen study ===
Reliable research in adolescent sexual behavior has been subject to political interventions in the past, particularly with funding availability, and the formal peer review process. Reasons for political interventions pertaining to research in adolescent sexual behavior is rooted in conservative ideologies from political figures and activist organizations. These groups tend not to support funding for abstinence education rather than programming that might inadvertently support teenage sexual behavior. These political interventions result in less of an understanding of long-term adolescent risk-taking sexual behavior and thus disease prevention.

The American Teen Study, which began in May 1991, was a peer-reviewed study on adolescent sexual risk-taking behavior whose funding from the National Institute of Child Health and Human Development was shut down by former secretary of Health and Human Services (HHS), Louis Sullivan. This cancellation led to further amendments created to halt the National Institutes of Health from funding research in adult and adolescent sexual behavior studies because conservative political figures such as, Gary Bauer, believed there was enough literature on this subject. However, the data meant to be collected from the American Teen Study was critical for accurately understanding the dynamics of how adolescents may come into contact with sexually transmitted infections, such as HIV, and how to further prevent adolescents from being infected.

=== The need for data ===
The American Teen Study acknowledged that there is insufficient data required for assessing rates of sexually transmitted infections among adolescents, which creates a barrier for trying to prevent infection rates and treatment of infections. HIV seroprevalence surveys, evaluating archived data on AIDS infections in the past, and adolescent risk-taking behaviors are the various types of data needed for accurately assessing the HIV infection trends among adolescents. Seroprevalence surveys give an idea about the rates of HIV infections among various groups of people, however, using this data solely is not always externally valid as it is not completely feasible to produce accurate rates of HIV among all of the groups being measured. Evaluating archived data of AIDS infections in the past is useful for obtaining an idea of how current HIV trends may be, but this data is not separated by age, which does not allow researchers to distinguish whether decreasing rates are applicable to adolescents. However, by integrating both of these methods, and further incorporating data on adolescent sexual behavior, the information would be more effective with determining HIV rates among various groups of adolescents. In addition, for future studies, researchers must incorporate comprehensive sample sizes, perform various research design types, understand the social norms that may influence risk-taking behaviors, and also be consistent with replicating research studies as risk-taking trends among adolescents may change. Overall, this data is needed in order to understand and effectively prevent infections of sexual transmitted infections, however, political figures policing peer-reviewed research studies gets in the way of obtaining this information.

=== Peer review process ===
Political interventions on peer-reviewed research may affect the integrity of the sciences, and political figures rescinding funding for certain studies they do not accept also affects the well-being of all individuals. It is recommended for specialist peer reviewers to have the freedom in being able to allocate funding for certain research studies, while also allowing a justified veto of funding decisions to be made by the HHS secretary if studies are later deemed as unethical. This reform is mindful that specialist peer reviewers will not be driven by personal bias, but instead by assuring that research funded is ethical, just, and neutral to the objective of the study, such as the American Teen Study.

== Organizations ==
- International Alliance for Child and Adolescent Mental Health and Schools
- International Association for Adolescent Health
- International Childhood and Youth Research Network (ICYRNet)
- World Health Organization - Adolescent Health
- Australian Association for Adolescent Health
- Canadian Association for Adolescent Health
- New Zealand Aotearoa Adolescent Health and Development
- The York Centre for Children, Youth, and Families
- SpunOut.ie Irish National Youth Website
- The Royal College of Psychiatrists, UK
- Youth Advolution for Health (Singapore)

== See also ==
- Adolescent and young adult oncology
- Adolescent Medicine
- Lancet Commission on Adolescent Health and Wellbeing
- Youth Risk Behavior Survey
- Advocates for Youth
- Freechild Project
