= Current Problems in Pediatric and Adolescent Health Care =

- Discipline: Pediatrics, adolescent medicine
- Language: English
- Edited by: Arthur Fierman

Publication details
- Former name(s): Current Problems in Pediatrics
- History: 1970-present
- Publisher: Elsevier
- Frequency: Monthly
- Impact factor: 2.327 (2016)

Standard abbreviations
- ISO 4: Curr. Probl. Pediatr. Adolesc. Health Care

Indexing
- ISSN: 1538-5442 (print); 1538-3199 (web)
- LCCN: 2001243463
- OCLC no.: 48470915

Links
- Journal homepage; Online access; Online archive

Current Problems in Pediatric and Adolescent Health Care is a monthly peer-reviewed medical review journal covering pediatric and adolescent medicine. It was established in 1970 as Current Problems in Pediatrics, obtaining its current name in 2001. It is published by Elsevier and the editor-in-chief is Arthur Fierman (New York University School of Medicine). According to the Journal Citation Reports, the journal has a 2016 impact factor of 2.327.
