= Adolescent medicine =

Medical subspecialty for adolescents

Adolescent medicine physician
Occupation
- Names: Physician
- Occupation type: Specialty
- Activity sectors: Medicine

Description
- Education required: Doctor of Medicine (M.D.); Doctor of Osteopathic medicine (D.O.); Bachelor of Medicine, Bachelor of Surgery (M.B.B.S.); Bachelor of Medicine, Bachelor of Surgery (MBChB)
- Fields of employment: Hospitals, clinics
- Related jobs: Pediatrics

Adolescent medicine, also known as adolescent and young adult medicine, is a medical subspecialty that focuses on care of patients who are in the adolescent period of development. This period begins at puberty and lasts until growth has stopped, at which time adulthood begins. Typically, patients in this age range will be in the last years of middle school up until college graduation (some doctors in this subspecialty treat young adults attending college at area clinics, in the subfield of college health). In developed nations, the psychosocial period of adolescence is extended both by an earlier start, as the onset of puberty begins earlier, and a later end, as patients require more years of education or training before they reach economic independence from their parents.

Medicine is often categorized most simply as pediatric and adult, with the pediatric category covering from infancy through both childhood and adolescence. However, such categorization is further divided in some contexts, such that adolescent medicine can be a more specific focus within pediatrics and geriatrics can be a more specific focus within adult medicine.

Issues with a high prevalence during adolescence are frequently addressed by providers. These include:

- Sexually transmitted disease (working with specialists in pediatric endocrinology, adolescent obstetrics and gynecology, immunology infectious diseases, and urology and reproductive medicine)
- Unintended pregnancy (working with specialists in adolescent obstetrics and gynecology, especially in neonatology and maternal-fetal medicine; many – though not all – are medically risky or high-risk cases or to those with psychosocial, environmental, and socioeconomic challenges)
- Birth control (access to prescription or non-prescription contraceptive methods)
- Sexual activity (such as masturbation, sexual intercourse and sexual abuse)
- Substance abuse
- Menstrual disorders (such as amenorrhea, dysmenorrhea and dysfunctional uterine bleeding)
- Acne (working with specialists in dermatology who treat adolescents)
- Eating disorders like anorexia nervosa and bulimia nervosa (working with nutritionists and dieticians, and also specialists in pediatric mental health counseling, clinical psychology, and pediatric psychiatry, who work with adolescents)
- Certain mental illnesses (especially personality disorders, anxiety disorders, major depression and suicide, bipolar disorder, and certain types of schizophrenia; in concert with mental health counselors, clinical psychologists, and pediatric psychiatrists specializing in adolescent health care)
- Delayed or precocious puberty (often working with specialists in adolescent pediatric endocrinology, urology, and andrology)

== Gay, lesbian and bisexual young people ==
Adolescents who are gay, lesbian or bisexual tend to demonstrate more risky health behaviors and have worse health outcomes compared to heterosexual youth, including:

- Substance abuse
- Suicidality
- Eating disorders and body image
- Sexual behaviors, including unintended pregnancy involvement (Contrary to assumptions, gay, bisexual or lesbian youth are more likely to report involvement in pregnancy compared to their heterosexual peers)
- Homelessness, which affects health and access to care

== Chronic conditions ==
Chronic conditions often cause delay in onset of puberty and temporary or permanent impediments to growth; conversely the growth and hormonal changes can destabilize treatment for the chronic condition. An increase in independence can lead to gaps in self-management, for example, in the decreased management of diabetes.

== Young peoples' access to health care ==
In addition, issues of medical ethics, particularly related to confidentiality and the right to consent for medical care, are pertinent to the practice of adolescent medicine.

Marginalised young people’s access is affected by their ability to recognize and understand health issues; service knowledge and attitudes toward help seeking; structural barriers; professionals' knowledge, skills, attitudes; service environments and structures; ability to navigate the health system; youth participation; and technology opportunities. Marginalised young people’s healthcare journeys can be supported by advocates that help them navigate the health system.

The particular needs of young people when accessing healthcare have also led the WHO to publishing guidelines for adolescent-friendly health care, in an effort to increase adolescents utilization of the healthcare system.

== Training ==
Adolescent medicine providers are generally drawn from the specialties of pediatrics, internal medicine, med/peds or family medicine. The certifying boards for these different specialties have varying requirements for certification, though all require successful completion of a fellowship and a passing score on a certifying exam. The American Board of Pediatrics and the American Board of Internal Medicine require evidence of scholarly achievement by candidates for subspecialty certification, usually in the form of an original research study.

In the United States, subspecialty medical board certification in adolescent medicine is available through the specialty boards of American Board of Internal Medicine, the American Osteopathic Board of Neurology and Psychiatry, the American Board of Family Medicine, the American Osteopathic Board of Family Physicians, the American Board of Pediatrics, and the American Osteopathic Board of Pediatrics.

== List of adolescent health centers in the United States ==
San Antonio, Texas

- Adolescent and Young Adult Medicine Clinic at Fort Sam Houston

Dallas, Texas

- Adolescent and Young Adult Clinic at Children's Medical Center (Dallas)
- Windhaven Adolescent Medicine Clinic at Texas Health Presbyterian Hospital (Plano)
- Girls to Women Health and Wellness (North Dallas)
- Young Men's Health and Wellness (North Dallas)

Houston, Texas

- Adolescent Medicine Clinic at Texas Children's Hospital

U.S. Air Force Academy, Colorado Spring, Colorado

- Cadet Medicine Clinic at U.S. Air Force Academy

Kansas City, Missouri

- Adolescent Clinic at Children's Mercy Hospital (Kansas City, Missouri)

Indianapolis, Indiana

- Section of Adolescent Medicine, Department of Pediatrics, Indiana University School of Medicine

New York City, New York

- The Adolescent Health Center at Mount Sinai Medical Center (Manhattan)
- Adolescent clinic at Children's Hospital at Montefiore Medical Center (the Bronx)
- The Door - Adolescent Health Center (Manhattan) www.door.org

Dayton, Ohio

- Division of Adolescent Young Adult Medicine at Dayton Children’s Hospital

Rochester, New York

- The Adolescent Health Clinic at University of Rochester

Los Angeles, California

- Teenage and Young Adult Health Center at Children's Hospital Los Angeles

San Francisco area

- Adolescent Medicine Clinic at Lucile Packard Children's Hospital at Stanford
- Adolescent Medicine Clinic at UCSF

Massachusetts

- Adolescent Center Boston Medical Center
- Cambridge Rindge & Latin High School Teen Health Center
- CHA Cambridge Teen Health Center
- Center for Adolescent & Young Adult Health, Milford
- Division of Adolescent Medicine at Children's Hospital Boston
- Everett Teen Health
- Somerville High School Somerville Teen Connection
- Teen Health Center in Boston Tufts Children's Hospital

Philadelphia, Pennsylvania

- Adolescent Medicine at Children's Hospital of Philadelphia
- Adolescent Medicine at St. Christopher's Hospital for Children
- Teen Health Center at Temple University Children's Medical Center
- Teen Health Center at Albert Einstein Medical Center

Columbus, Ohio

- Adolescent Health at Nationwide Children's Hospital

Seattle, Washington

- Department of Adolescent Medicine at Seattle Children's Hospital

Cincinnati, Ohio

- Division of Adolescent Medicine at Cincinnati Children's Hospital Medical Center

Richmond, Virginia

- Adolescent Medicine at Children's Hospital of Richmond

Fayetteville, North Carolina

- Adolescent Medicine at Womac Army Medical Center

== List of adolescent health centers in Australia ==
Sydney

- The Department of Adolescent Medicine at The Children's Hospital at Westmead
- The Department of Adolescent Medicine at Westmead Hospital
- Youth Consultancy & the Chill, at Royal Prince Alfred Hospital

Melbourne

- The Centre For Adolescent Health Royal Children's Hospital Melbourne

== Relationship with college health ==
In the United States, the subspecialty of college health is closely affiliated with adolescent medicine. Many adolescent medicine fellowships include rotations in college-based student health clinics and many adolescent medicine physicians work in college health clinics.

== Professional organizations ==
Founded in 1987, the International Association for Adolescent Health (IAAH) is a multidisciplinary, non-government organization with a broad focus on youth health. In the United States, the Society for Adolescent Health and Medicine (SAHM) is the multidisciplinary, national professional association for adolescent medicine and host the most popular national adolescent medicine conference annually.

== Publications ==
- Journal of Adolescent Health (published by Elsevier on behalf of the Society for Adolescent Health and Medicine)
- Journal of Pediatric and Adolescent Gynecology (published by the North American Society for Pediatric and Adolescent Gynecology)
- Adolescent Medicine: State of the Art Reviews (published by the American Academy of Pediatrics)

== See also ==
- Adolescent and young adult oncology
- Adolescent Health
- Adolescent sexuality
- Teen pregnancy
- Youth Health
