= ReachOut.com =

Youth mental health support service

ReachOut Australia
- Nickname: ReachOut
- Founded: 31 December 1995 (Website: March 1998)
- Founder: Jack Heath
- Chief Executive Officer: Gary Groves
- Revenue: $14,228,592 (2025)
- Expenses: $13,424,613 (2025)
- Website: https://about.au.reachout.com/home
- Formerly called: Inspire Foundation

ReachOut.com is a registered Australian charity for young Australians that provides information, support and resources about mental health, enabling them to develop resilience and increase coping skills, while facilitating help-seeking behaviour. The site offers various resources in the form of fact sheets, stories, podcasts and online forums.

== History ==
ReachOut.com was launched in March 1998 as an initiative of Inspire Foundation (now known as ReachOut Australia) to help young people with their mental health.

ReachOut provides online support to young people going through tough times. It provides online resources like real stories and fact sheets which are written alongside young people, and a peer-support forum which is a space where young people can talk about mental health issues and receive support and help. In 2008, ReachOut opened sites in Ireland and the USA. Both sites were later closed.

== Site content ==
=== Writing style and tone ===
The majority of ReachOut is written in an informal tone to appeal to the younger audience. The writing is often broken up into smaller sections or contains lists, and is usually accompanied by an image.

=== Site authors ===
Young people play a key role in writing content and developing ReachOut. The service often partners with other health and community service organisations to provide accurate and current information. As the site is informational, users are referred to phone and web counselling services such as Kids Helpline and Lifeline.

== Target Audience ==
ReachOut.com is primarily targeted towards children and adolescents in Australia, particularly ones that are going through challenging times. As of 2023, ReachOut does not offer its services in any other countries, and the website requires an official Australian postal code to access. Staff have redirected overseas users to similar websites, such as Kooth and SANE, to ensure that they get the support they need.

== Services Linked With ReachOut.com ==
Reach Out.com has expanded its website to include new services.

=== ReachOut Central ===
ReachOut Central is a "serious" game that works interactively to help young people explore how thinking, behaviour and feelings interact with each other. A series of real life scenarios allow users to discover how the way they think and feel can positively influence their behaviour (or vice versa) and the impact this has on the outcome of situations. The information provided in the game links with information provided on ReachOut.com through the format of tips and tricks and links to fact sheets.

On 17 September 2007, ReachOut Central launched as a full version game after a successful run with the pilot program with limited scenarios. The current version of the game allows for further expansion in additional scenarios that can be scripted and updated when new information is made available.

Within two weeks of launching ReachOut Central was nominated and eventually named as a winner in the Changemakers.net Why Games Matter Competition. The announcement of the win with two other games was made on 8 November 2007. The interactive game was the only Australian game nominated.

ReachOut Central also came runner-up in the Health Category of the Stockholm Challenge Awards for 2008. ReachOut Central was one of the 19 finalists chosen from across the world under the Health Category of the Awards. The Stockholm Challenge Awards is an international award that inspires and challenges the information and technology industries to create social and sustainable benefits for individuals and communities through their projects.

=== ReachOut Community Forum ===
The online forum lets young people share what is happening in their lives, in a safe environment moderated by staff and trained moderators. The forums are not a counselling service but often help to refer young people to information and services. They are also a way for ReachOut.com users to connect to each other and find others they can share similar experiences with. In June 2025, ReachOut closed the Online Community after 18 years of operation, during which time more than 2 million users across Australia had accessed the peer support forum.

=== ReachOut Teachers' Network ===
Launched in April 2007, the ReachOut Teachers’ Network connects secondary school teachers with the ReachOut service by providing classroom lessons on issues that young people may face within the curriculum areas in schools.

=== ReachOut Pro ===
The ReachOut.com Professionals service targets professionals dealing with young people and mental health by providing an online source of information and resources. The provision of these resources aims to provide a way for a range of professionals to engage young people in the treatment and maintenance of better mental health outcomes.

=== ReachOut Youth Involvement ===
All of ReachOut Australia's programs have input from young people, all of whom are volunteers. ReachOut has over 100 Youth Ambassadors from around Australia, and it is these young people who have input to the development of the website, and activities in which ReachOut partakes. The work the young people undertake ranges from administration tasks in the central office, to presentations for the service and moderation of the ReachOut Community Forums. ReachOut also operates PeerChat, a free one-to-one online peer support service connecting young people aged 16–25 with trained peer workers; a 2024 evaluation of the service found it was achieving significant positive outcomes consistent with its intended goals.

=== ReachOut Parents ===
In May 2016, ReachOut introduced a new free online service for parents who want to help but would like to know more about topics such as bullying, self-esteem, anxiety, and social media. A recent study found that 70% of teenagers do not access support, and if they do, most will turn to their parents first. ReachOut Parents provides practical support to encourage effective communication between parents and young people aged 12–18 years.

== Media coverage and partnerships ==
ReachOut Australia has been cited in major Australian media outlets as a leading expert in youth mental health. In June 2025, the Deputy CEO of ReachOut appeared on ABC Radio National to discuss research by Suicide Prevention Australia into rising rates of suicidal behaviour among young adults. In November 2025, a ReachOut Parents Coach was quoted in The Sydney Morning Herald on how parenting styles affect teenagers' brain development. In October 2025, ReachOut Australia was named as a partner in a YouTube Australia initiative to create a dedicated shelf of age-appropriate mental health videos for teenagers.

== Awards ==
- Gold Harold for Health & Medicine, Life Education 2013
- Best Not for Profit Site, SiteCore Site of the Year Awards (ANZ) 2013
- Inspire Foundation (ReachOut.com) awarded for excellence in suicide prevention within social media in 2014

== See also ==
- Depression (mood)
- Eating disorder
- Health promotion
- Mental health
- Substance abuse prevention
- Youth health
