= Youth Risk Behavior Surveillance System =

The Youth Risk Behavior Surveillance System (YRBSS) is an American biennial survey of adolescent health risk and health protective behaviors such as smoking, drinking, drug use, diet, and physical activity conducted by the Centers for Disease Control and Prevention. The YRBSS is a key public health monitoring program in the United States that tracks various health behaviors in high school students, including national Youth Risk Behavior Survey (YRBS) and local surveys conducted by states, tribes, territories, and school districts. It surveys students in grades 9–12 at their high schools. It is one of the major sources of information about these risk behaviors, and is used by federal agencies to track drug use, sexual behavior, and other risk behaviors.

The YRBSS was created in 1990 in order to monitor progress towards protecting youth from HIV infection. There are only two repeated nationally representative surveys which give all the information in existence about youth risk behavior; YRBSS and the University of Michigan's Monitoring the Future (MTF). In 2021, these surveys were conducted amidst the COVID-19 pandemic, highlighting the need for timely data to understand shifts in youth health risks and meet evolving public health needs. Every academic research study which evaluates national US trends over time in adolescent smoking, drinking, drug use, sexual activity, or other health behaviors is based on these two studies. There are no other nationally representative sources of information about these behaviors other than YRBSS and MTF.

== Methodology ==
The YRBSS is the official source of information about adolescent risk behaviors used to evaluate federal, state, and local public health initiatives to decrease these risk behaviors. The survey targets students from grades 9 through 12 attending both public and private high schools across the United States. To ensure varied representation, schools are chosen through a national sampling process, and within each selected school, classes are randomly picked for participation. Students complete the survey using a computer-readable questionnaire booklet designed for anonymity, requiring about one class period, or roughly 45 minutes, to finish.

=== Questionnaire ===
In 2019, the YRBS questionnaire featured a total of 99 questions, with 89 included in the standard survey used across different sites. An additional 10 questions, focusing on specific topics of interest to the CDC and its stakeholders, were incorporated to form the national 99-question version. Each cycle of the YRBS includes updates to ensure that new and existing risk behaviors among high school students are accurately measured.

CDC subject matter experts and other professionals suggest modifications to the questionnaire, including addition, removal, or adjustment of questions. Proposed changes are rigorously reviewed to enhance format, clarity, and ease of reading, followed by cognitive testing to assess effectiveness. CDC then refines the questions based on these testing outcomes.

All survey questions, except those measuring height, weight, and race, were designed in a multiple choice format, providing up to eight distinct answer options with one correct response per question. Reliability was validated through test-retest analysis, yielding strong consistency.

=== Sampling ===
In 2019, the Youth Risk Behavior Survey (YRBSS) sampling framework included all standard public, charter, parochial, and select nonpublic schools with students in grades 9–12 across the 50 U.S. states and the District of Columbia. School data sourced from Market Data Retrieval, Inc., and the National Center for Education Statistics (NCES), utilizing the Common Core of Data for public schools and the Private School Universe Survey for nonpublic institutions.

The 2019 Youth Risk Behavior Survey (YRBSS) employed a three-stage sampling approach to achieve a broad, representative snapshot of U.S. high school students in grades 9-12:

==== Primary Sampling Units (PSUs) ====
- The first stage focused on identifying 1,257 PSUs, defined as individual counties or combined groups of neighboring counties.
- These PSUs were grouped into 16 categories, or "strata," based on urban or rural status and the proportion of non-Hispanic Black and Hispanic students.
- From this group, a selection of 54 PSUs was made, with higher selection probabilities assigned to larger schools within these areas.

==== Secondary Sampling Units (Schools) ====
- Within the chosen PSUs, 162 schools (referred to as secondary sampling units) were then selected, prioritizing those with larger enrollments for a more representative sample.
- To ensure even small schools were adequately represented, 15 additional schools with lower enrollments were also included, resulting in a total of 177 secondary units across 184 physical school sites.

==== Classroom selection ====
- In the final stage, researchers randomly selected one or two classes per grade (9–12) from each participating school.
- Students from these selected classes were then invited to take part in the survey, providing a comprehensive cross-section of student responses without replacements for any declines in participation.

This three-tiered sampling ensured that the YRBSS captured a national sample reflecting a wide range of student demographics and school sizes.

== Survey subgroup considerations ==
The CDC's 2023 Youth Risk Behavior Survey (YRBS) report highlights concerns for several sub-groups at heightened risk for adverse health outcomes. Students from minority groups, for instance, face elevated risks related to mental health issues, substance use, and experiencing or witnessing violence compared to their peers. Additionally, students with disabilities or those with lower socioeconomic backgrounds often report higher instances of bullying, reduced access to health resources, and increased substance use. The CDC's YRBSS report from 2023 highlights particular concerns for sub-groups experiencing higher risks, including female and LGBTQ+ students, who report higher instances of violence, poor mental health, and suicidal thoughts compared to their heterosexual and cisgender peers.

=== Youth with disabilities ===
Students with disabilities, particularly those who are on Individualized Education Programs (IEPs), face heightened risks regarding mental health and victimization. Studies using YRBSS data have indicated that youth with disabilities, identified through IEP status, may face elevated risks for certain health behaviors. For instance, students with IEPs in Connecticut have shown higher rates of bullying victimization, cyberbullying, and drug use compared to their peers without IEPs. Data from the Connecticut YRBSS for the years 2013, 2015, 2017, and 2019 was analyzed. The sample included over 9,200 students, with 850 reporting IEP status. Logistic regression was applied to examine links between IEP status and various health risk behaviors. These findings underscore the unique health risks experienced by students with disabilities and highlight potential areas for targeted interventions.

These results substantiate the adaptability of YRBSS data at state levels. Connecticut's inclusion of a disability measure showcases how YRBSS can be tailored to meet specific needs, an approach that could be extended to the national survey.

=== Socioeconomic status ===
Students from low socioeconomic backgrounds are also at a disadvantage, reporting higher rates of substance use, mental health problems, and exposure to violence. The National Center for Children in Poverty notes that these students often lack access to essential health services, which can contribute to a cycle of poverty and poor health outcomes. The YRBS data reveal that students from lower-income families are more likely to engage in risky behaviors, including substance use, as a coping mechanism for their challenging environments.

=== Female students ===
Female students experience distinct health risks, including higher rates of sexual violence and mental health challenges. The YRBS report shows that nearly 1 in 5 female students reported experiencing sexual violence during their lifetime, which is significantly higher than their male counterparts. This increased vulnerability often correlates with mental health struggles, such as depression and anxiety, leading to detrimental effects on their academic performance and overall well-being.

=== LGBTQ+ students ===
LGBTQ+ youth are particularly vulnerable, facing elevated rates of bullying, mental health issues, and suicidal ideation. The YRBS indicates that LGBTQ+ students report higher instances of violence, including physical and sexual harassment, compared to their heterosexual and cisgender peers. A study published in JAMA Network Open found that LGBTQ+ youth are more likely to experience severe mental health crises and report feelings of hopelessness, with 40% seriously considering suicide. A study in Pediatrics found that transgender and gender diverse (tgd) youth were more likely to be bullied and have attempted suicide than cisgender youth. Further, the rates of bullying for tgd youth was significantly higher compared to cisgender sexual minority youth, who themselves experienced significantly higher rates of bullying than cisgender heterosexual youth.

In 2025, the Trump administration directed the survey to end data collection on gender identity.

== See also ==
- National Longitudinal Study of Adolescent to Adult Health
