= 21st Century Cancer Access to Life-Saving Early detection, Research and Treatment Act =

The 21st Century Cancer Access to Life-Saving Early detection, Research and Treatment (ALERT) Act is a bill in the United States Congress to provide funding for cancer research. The bill, intended to modernize the National Cancer Act of 1971, was introduced by Senators Edward M. Kennedy (sponsor of the original bill) and Kay Bailey Hutchison on March 26, 2009. The bill has not yet been enacted into law.
