= Journal of Pediatric and Adolescent Gynecology =

- Discipline: Pediatrics, gynecology
- Language: English
- Edited by: Joseph S. Sanfilippo

Publication details
- Former name(s): Adolescent and Pediatric Gynecology
- History: 1988-present
- Publisher: Elsevier
- Frequency: Bimonthly
- Impact factor: 1.683 (2014)

Standard abbreviations
- ISO 4: J. Pediatr. Adolesc. Gynecol.

Indexing
- ISSN: 1083-3188 (print); 1873-4332 (web)

Links
- Journal homepage; Online access; Online archive

The Journal of Pediatric and Adolescent Gynecology is a peer-reviewed medical journal covering gynecology as it relates to the fields of pediatrics and adolescent medicine. It was established in 1988 as Adolescent and Pediatric Gynecology, obtaining its current name in 1996. It is published six times per year by Elsevier, which has published the journal since 1988; it is also the official journal of the North American Society for Pediatric and Adolescent Gynecology. The editor-in-chief is Paula J. Adams Hillard. According to the Journal Citation Reports, the journal has a 2018 impact factor of 2.298.

== See also ==
Pediatric gynecology
