= Shannon Emerick =

American voice actress

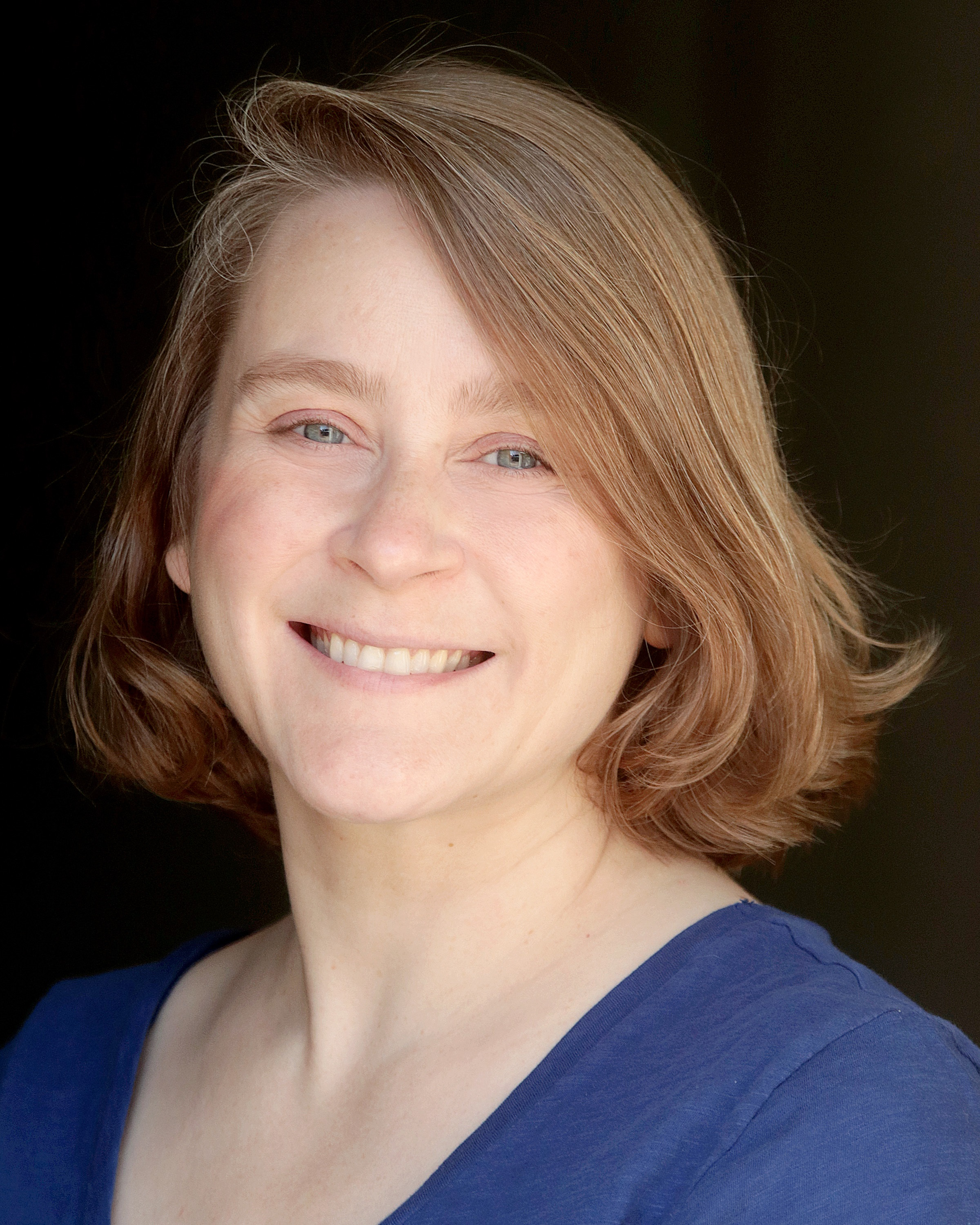
- Born: Shannon Elizabeth Emerick; September 24, 1973 (age 52); Dallas, Texas, U.S.
- Education: Yale University
- Occupation: Actress
- Years active: 2004–present
- Agent: Pastorini-Bosby Talent Agency
- Children: 1

Shannon Elizabeth Emerick (born September 24, 1973) is an American voice actress who voices a number of English language localizations of Japanese anime shows. She graduated from Yale University with a B.A. in Theater Studies and English. In anime, she is best known as the voice of Kei Kishimoto from Gantz, Charlotte Dunois from the Infinite Stratos series, and Riki Naoe from the Little Busters! series. Outside of voice acting, she is a stage actress in the Houston area. She won the Best Actress award from Houston Press for her theater work twice in 2006 and 2011, respectively.

== Biography ==
In 2017, Emerick voiced Arata Wataya as a young child in Sentai Filmworks' English dub of the adaptation of Yuki Suetsugu's manga series Chihayafuru. Wataya is one of the three main characters in the series.

== English dubbing roles ==
=== Animation ===
Year	Title	Role	Notes	Source
2014	AKB0048	Yoko Asamiya	also season 2	
2014	Amnesia	Orion		
2012	Tatakau Shisho: Book of Bantorra	Mirepoch Finder		
2011	Clannad series	Garbage Doll	also season 2	
2012	Dream Eater Merry	Engi Threepiece		
2003	Mythical Detective Loki Ragnarok	Loki		
2005	Gantz	Kei Kishimoto		
2014	Gatchaman Crowds	Rui Ninomiya	also season 2	
2005	Godannar	Ellis Valentine		
2010	Hakuoki series	Kaoru Nagumo	also season 2	
2012	Infinite Stratos series	Charlotte Dunois	also season 2 and OVAs	
2013	Little Busters series	Riki Naoe	also season 2 and EX	
2013	Phi Brain series	Cubik Galois	also season 2	
2014	Rozen Maiden: Zurückspulen	Jun Sakurada		
2014	No Game No Life	Tet		
2015	Akame ga Kill!	The Emperor		
2017	Chivalry of a Failed Knight	Kagami Kusakabe		
2017	Chihayafuru	Young Arata Wataya		
2018	Revue Starlight	Junna Hoshimi		
2018	Made in Abyss	Nat		
2018	UQ Holder!	Haruna Saotome, Ruki		
2020	BanG Dream!	Misaki Okusawa/Michelle	Season 2	
2021	Vinland Saga	Thorfinn (young)	Sentai Filmworks Dub	
2023	Farming Life in Another World	Anne		
2024	The Demon Sword Master of Excalibur Academy	Leonis Death Magnus		
2024	My Instant Death Ability Is So Overpowered	Yogiri (young)		
2024	Wistoria: Wand and Sword	Narrator		
2024	Dungeon People	Furin		
2025	Loner Life in Another World	Handicraft Girl		
2025	Hero Without a Class: Who Even Needs Skills?!	Reiner (young)		
2025	Backstabbed in a Backwater Dungeon	Light		

=== Video games ===
List of dubbing performances in video games
Year	Title	Role	Notes	Source
2021	World's End Club	Tattsun		

== Awards ==
Year	Award	Result
2006	Houston Best Actress award	Won
2011	Houston Best Actress award	Won
