= Matthew Zachary =

American patient advocate, activist and cancer survivor

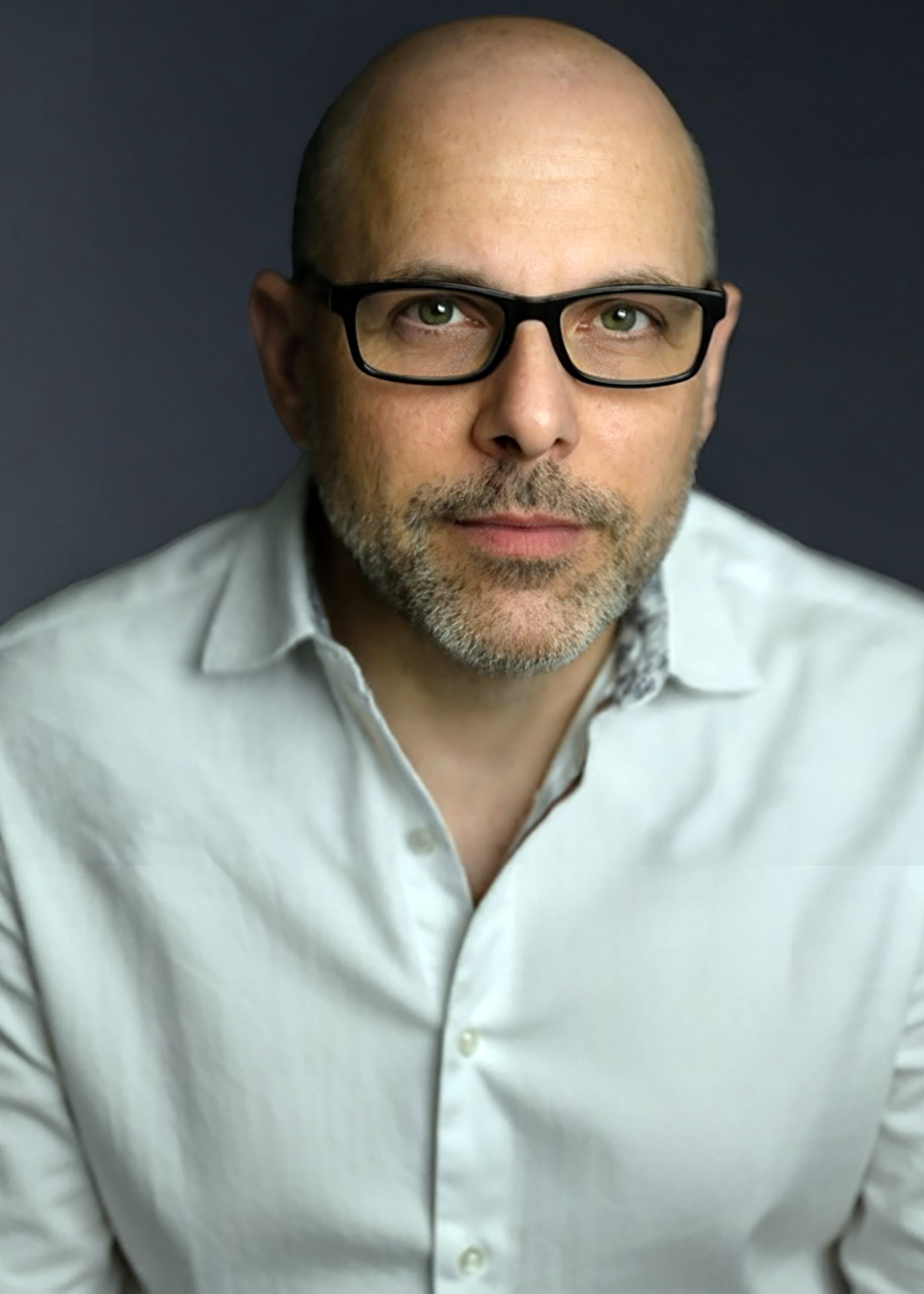
- Born: May 29th 1974; Brooklyn, New York
- Education: Binghamton University
- Occupations: Patient advocate; author; podcast host
- Known for: Founder of Stupid Cancer and We The Patients; host of Out of Patients with Matthew Zachary

Matthew Zachary (May 29, 1974, Brooklyn, New York) is an American patient advocate, brain cancer survivor, author, and podcast host. He works in adolescent and young adult cancer advocacy, healthcare commentary, and patient rights initiatives.

== Early life and illness ==
Matthew Zachary was diagnosed with brain cancer at age 21 while a college student. The experience and his treatment shaped his subsequent advocacy for adolescent and young adult cancer patients and survivors.

== Career ==
Before his work in patient advocacy, Zachary was active as a professional concert pianist. He released two independently produced solo piano albums, Scribblings (2000) and Every Step of the Way (2001).

In 2007, Zachary founded the nonprofit organization Stupid Cancer (originally known as I'm Too Young For This!), created to build community, resources, and public awareness for adolescents and young adults affected by cancer. During his leadership, the organization developed conferences, peer support programming, multimedia outreach, and community initiatives for young adult cancer patients and survivors.

At the same time, he launched media initiatives associated with Stupid Cancer, including live talks and streaming programs.

Throughout the 2010s, Zachary expanded into healthcare media and public commentary through live programming, interviews, and digital audio projects focused on survivorship, healthcare access, patient experience, and insurance issues.

Around 2018–2019, Zachary transitioned away from day-to-day executive leadership at Stupid Cancer and moved toward media entrepreneurship and advisory roles.

In 2021 Zachary created, hosted, and executive-produced The Cancer Mavericks: A History of Survivorship, an eight-part documentary audio series produced by OffScrip Media. The series premiered with a special preview on May 7, 2021, and released episodes monthly through December 2021 to coincide with the 50th anniversary of the National Cancer Act (1971). The Cancer Mavericks was selected as an official selection in the podcast category at CineHealth, an international festival showcasing health-related storytelling in film, audio, and multimedia.

Following his transition from Stupid Cancer, Zachary co-founded OffScrip Media and continued to host and produce long-running audio programming. His podcast, ''Out of Patients with Matthew Zachary'', features discussions with patients, clinicians, healthcare executives, policymakers, and advocates.

He also produced documentary and series work related to survivorship and advocacy, including projects described in industry coverage that examine the history of cancer survivorship and patient leadership.

In 2024 and 2025, Zachary expanded his public work into broader healthcare policy and patient rights commentary through We The Patients, a healthcare advocacy initiative focused on insurance barriers, healthcare access, medical debt, and patient rights.

In 2025 and 2026, Zachary described a preference for relationship-based care over traditional patient-centric models, and has said that patients should be treated as partners in medical decision-making.

In April 2026, Zachary presented Matthew Zachary: Live at Merkin Hall, a live storytelling and performance event in New York City commemorating the 30th anniversary of his brain cancer diagnosis.

In May 2026, Zachary published a new book We The Patients: Understanding, Navigating, and Surviving America’s Healthcare Nightmare.
