= Med-Peds =

Medical specialty

Internal medicine-pediatrics, or med-peds, is a medical specialty in the United States in which doctors train to be board certified in both internal medicine and pediatrics. A residency program in med-peds is four years in length, contrasted with three years for internal medicine or pediatrics alone. Upon completion of a med-peds residency, a doctor can practice in the areas of internal medicine or pediatrics or can complete a fellowship program to further specialize in an internal medicine or pediatrics sub-field.

== History ==
Combined internal medicine-pediatrics residency programs have existed since 1967, with its origins beginning as early as 1949 in the form of a two-year rotating internship. The specialty was initially established to provide broad-based training in primary care, but programs now offer a curriculum that prepares residents for primary care, hospital medicine, or education in the subspecialties.

== Training ==
Internal medicine physicians, or internists, train three additional years after medical school leading to board certification in internal medicine. Pediatricians train three additional years after medical school to board-certify in pediatrics. Med-peds physicians train for four years and can be "double-boarded" for both these specialties. Since there is frequent crossover of disease and treatment between children and adults, med-peds training consolidates these two specialties into four years. The performance of med-peds physicians on the two national board exams is equal to their one-specialty (specific internist or pediatrician) counterparts.

The ACGME sets requirements for residency programs in medicine-pediatrics. They require that the curriculum be specific for the combined program, not merely training in one specialty after the other. Residents should not be assigned to a medicine service or a pediatrics service for more than 6 consecutive months. Training is required to include experience in the emergency department, critical care services, geriatrics, neonatal intensive care, adolescent medicine, research, and at least four subspecialty services each for adults and pediatrics including cardiology and neurology. At least one-third of training must be with inpatients and one-third with outpatients.

Med-peds physicians are heavily trained for primary care. A recent study on post-residency training showed that 61% of med-peds physicians pursue primary care as a career, 18% enter subspecialties, and 17% pursue hospital medicine. Many subspecialties are available to the med-peds physician, with the current most popular being Infectious Disease, Critical Care, Allergy/Immunology, and Endocrinology.

== Comparison with family medicine ==
Med-peds and family medicine are similar in patient populations. Physicians of both specialties can care for all patients from newborn to geriatric patients. Med-peds physicians tend to score higher on licensing exams; the average new med-peds resident scored 236 on step 1 while the average family medicine resident scored 221 in 2016 (the average new resident in all specialties combined scored 233). Family medicine residents train for three years, while med-peds residents train for four. Med-peds physicians are given more training in order to become more proficient at treating and diagnosing more complex diseases, including more emphasis on critical care medicine. Med-peds physicians also receive equal training in adults and pediatrics while family medicine physicians spend a larger percentage of their training working with mostly adults; most family medicine residencies typically spend just 9 months dedicated to pediatrics. Med-peds prepares a physician well for private practice, academic medicine, hospitalist programs, and fellowships. A trend also seen is that an increasing percentage of med-peds physicians treat inpatients (patients in the hospital) as opposed to an outpatient clinic setting.

== See also ==
- Society of General Internal Medicine
