= Adolescent and young adult oncology =

Medical branch dealing of cancer in adolescent and young adults

Adolescent and young adult oncology is a branch of medicine that deals with the prevention, diagnosis, and treatment of cancer in adolescent and young adult (AYA) patients aged 16–40. Studies have continuously shown that while pediatric cancer survival rates have gone up, the survival rate for adolescents and young adults has remained stagnant. While many clinical trials exist for adults with cancer and children with cancer, AYAs underutilize clinical trials. Most pediatric clinical trials serve patients up to age 21. Additionally, AYAs face problems that adults and children rarely see including college concerns, fertility, and sense of aloneness. Studies have often shown that treating young adults with the same protocols used in pediatrics is more effective than adult oriented treatments.

In countries like the US and the UK, specialized AYA units have started to be built in children's and adult hospitals to cater to the need of these age groups. AYA wards are designed to be bright and welcoming with many games and televisions to keep patients busy. The need for these spaces come from the findings that AYAs tend to prefer pediatric wards over adult wards, but do not like to be treated like children.

AYA teams are usually made up of specialists that specialize in both pediatric and adult medicine because people under 21 tend to do better under pediatric care.

== United States ==
Internationally, different countries tend to treat the AYA age group in different environments. Most AYA treatment centers in the US are within larger children's hospitals. The organization, Teen Cancer America was created to establish more AYA wards in hospitals across the US, and currently there are about 21 hospitals affiliated with Teen Cancer America, and many more with AYA programs. The American Academy of Pediatrics' opinion is that children should be under the care of a pediatrician until they deem not necessary, and children's hospitals in the US are increasingly treating older patients well into their twenties as a part of AYA and other adult programs.

== United Kingdom ==
The UK is seen to be one of the pioneers of AYA cancer care at its hospitals. Teenage Cancer Trust is a cancer care and support charity in the UK that exists to improve the cancer experience of young people aged 13–24. Founded in 1990, the charity's key service is providing specialist teenage units in NHS hospitals. It also trains and funds staff who are teenage cancer specialists. The units are dedicated areas for teenage and young adult patients, who are involved in their concept and creation. Medical facilities on the units are equipped with computers, TVs, game consoles, and bright colored design. The UK has over 28 units in children's hospitals and adult hospitals dedicated to AYAs aged 13–24.

== See also ==
- Teenage Cancer Trust
- Childhood cancer
- Matthew Zachary
