= Disaster medicine =

Area of medical specialization

Disaster Medicine Physician
Occupation
- Names: Physician
- Occupation type: Specialty
- Activity sectors: Medicine

Description
- Education required: Doctor of Medicine (M.D.); Doctor of Osteopathic medicine (D.O.); Bachelor of Medicine, Bachelor of Surgery (M.B.B.S.); Bachelor of Medicine, Bachelor of Surgery (MBChB)
- Fields of employment: Hospitals, Clinics

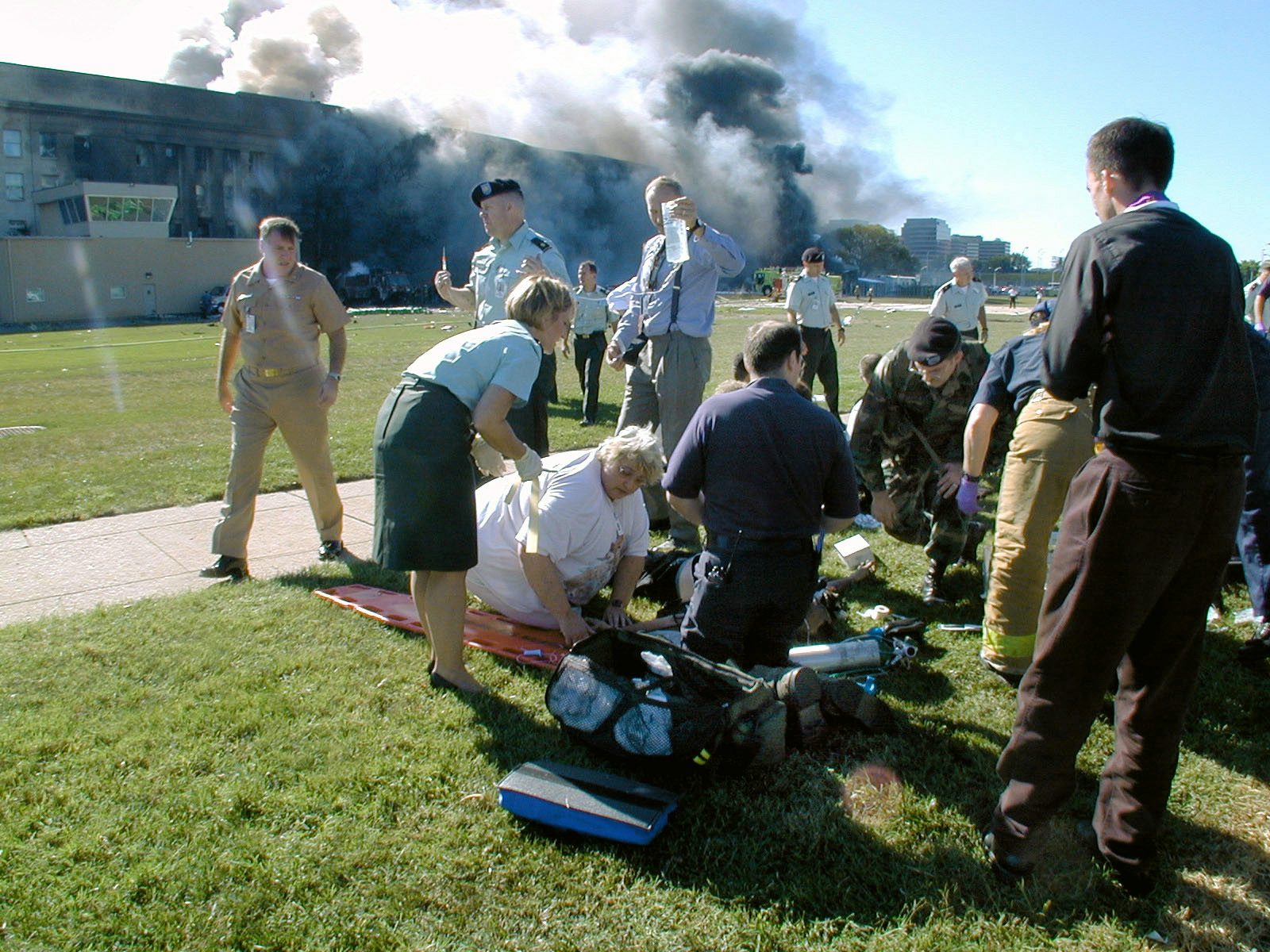
Triage station at the Pentagon after the impact of American Airlines Flight 77 during the September 11, 2001 attacks

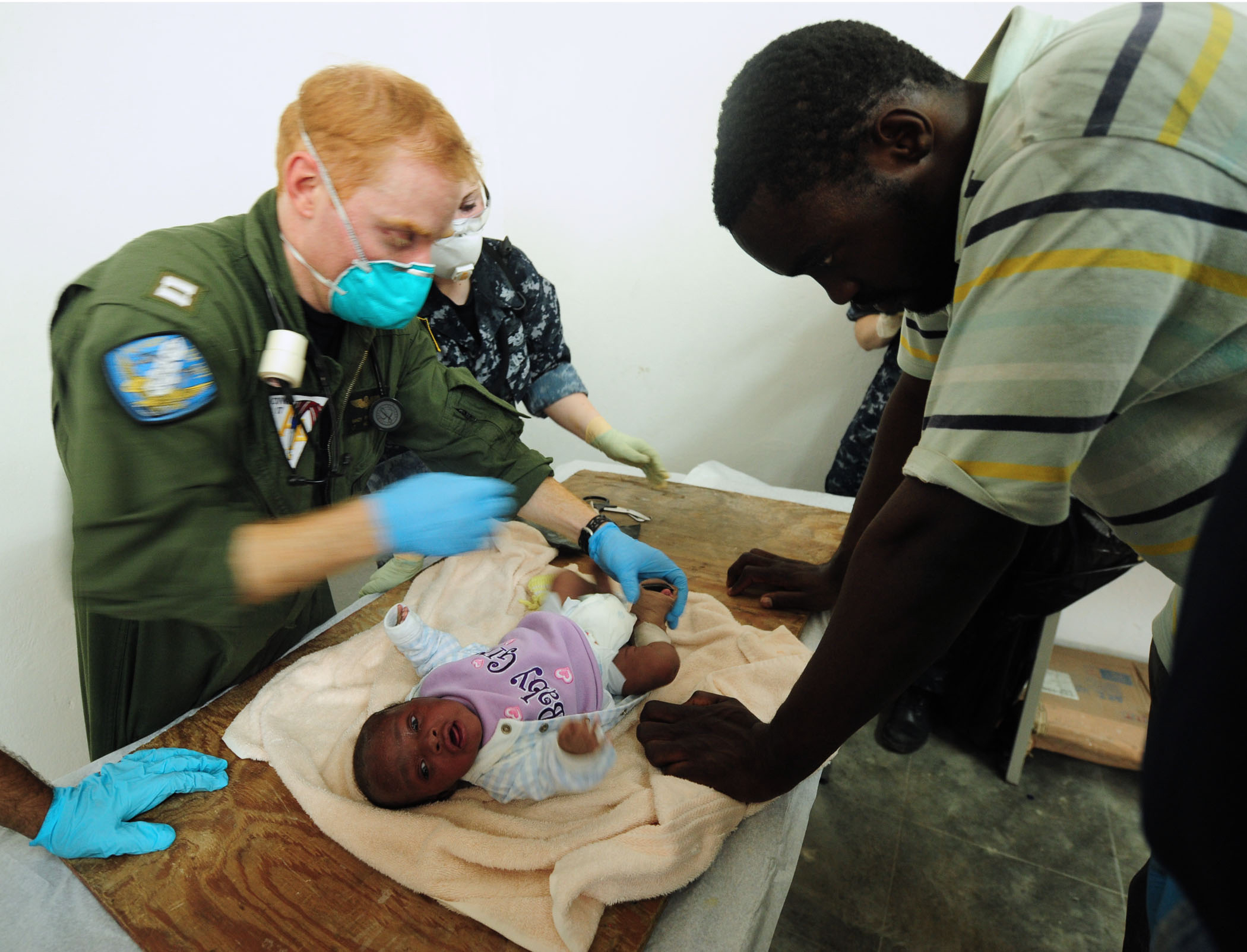
U.S. Navy sailors assigned to the aircraft carrier USS Carl Vinson treat a baby injured by 2010 Haiti earthquake

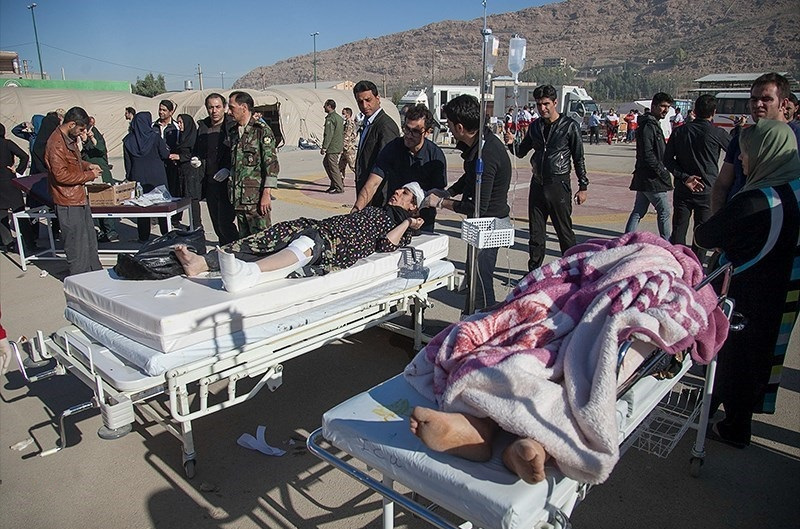
Treatment of the survivors of the 2017 Kermanshah earthquake

Disaster medicine is the area of medical specialization serving the dual areas of providing health care to disaster survivors and providing medically related disaster preparation, disaster planning, disaster response and disaster recovery leadership throughout the disaster life cycle. Disaster medicine specialists provide insight, guidance and expertise on the principles and practice of medicine both in the disaster impact area and healthcare evacuation receiving facilities to emergency management professionals, hospitals, healthcare facilities, communities and governments. The disaster medicine specialist is the liaison between and partner to the medical contingency planner, the emergency management professional, the incident command system, government and policy makers.

Disaster medicine is unique among the medical specialties in that unlike all other areas of specialization, the disaster medicine specialist does not practice the full scope of the specialty everyday but only in emergencies. Indeed, the disaster medicine specialist hopes to never practice the full scope of skills required for board certification. However, like specialists in public health, environmental medicine and occupational medicine, disaster medicine specialists engage in the development and modification of public and private policy, legislation, disaster planning and disaster recovery. Within the United States of America, the specialty of disaster medicine fulfills the requirements set for by Homeland Security Presidential Directives (HSPD), the National Response Plan (NRP), the National Incident Management System (NIMS), the National Resource Typing System (NRTS) and the NIMS Implementation Plan for Hospitals and Healthcare Facilities.

== Definitions ==
Disaster healthcare – The provision of healthcare services by healthcare professionals to disaster survivors and disaster responders both in a disaster impact area and healthcare evacuation receiving facilities throughout the disaster life cycle.

Disaster behavioral health – Disaster behavioral health deals with the capability of disaster responders to perform optimally, and for disaster survivors to maintain or rapidly restore function, when faced with the threat or actual impact of disasters and extreme events.

Disaster law – Disaster law deals with the legal ramifications of disaster planning, preparedness, response and recovery, including but not limited to financial recovery, public and private liability, property abatement and condemnation.

Disaster life cycle – The time line for disaster events beginning with the period between disasters (interphase), progressing through the disaster event and the disaster response and culminating in the disaster recovery. Interphase begins as the end of the last disaster recovery and ends at the onset of the next disaster event. The disaster event begins when the event occurs and ends when the immediate event subsides. The disaster response begins when the event occurs and ends when acute disaster response services are no longer needed. Disaster recovery also begins with the disaster response and continues until the affected area is returned to the pre-event condition.

Disaster planning – The act of devising a methodology for dealing with a disaster event, especially one with the potential to occur suddenly and cause great injury and/or loss of life, damage and hardship. Disaster planning occurs during the disaster interphase.

Disaster preparation – The act of practicing and implementing the plan for dealing with a disaster event before an event occurs, especially one with the potential to occur suddenly and cause great injury and/or loss of life, damage and hardship. Disaster preparation occurs during the disaster interphase.

Disaster recovery – The restoration or return to the former or better state or condition proceeding a disaster event (i.e., status quo ante, the state of affairs that existed previously). Disaster recovery is the fourth phase of the disaster life cycle.

Disaster response – The ability to answer the intense challenges posed by a disaster event. Disaster response is the third phase of the disaster life cycle.

Medical contingency planning – The act of devising a methodology for meeting the medical requirements of a population affected by a disaster event.

Medical surge – An influx of patients (physical casualties and psychological casualties), bystanders, visitors, family members, media and individuals searching for the missing who present to a hospital or healthcare facility for treatment, information and/or shelter as a result of a disaster.

Surge capacity – The ability to manage a sudden, unexpected increase in patient volume that would otherwise severely challenge or exceed the current capacity of the health care system.

Medical triage – The separation of patients based on severity of injury or illness in light of available resources.

Psychosocial triage – The separation of patients based on the severity of psychological injury or impact in light of available resources.

== History ==
The term "disaster medicine" first appeared in the medical lexicon in the post-World War II era. Although coined by former and current military physicians who had served in World War II, the term grow out of a concern for the need to care for military casualties, or nuclear holocaust victims, but out of the need to provide care to the survivors of natural disasters and the not-yet-distant memory of the 1917-1918 Influenza Pandemic.

The term "disaster medicine" continued to appear sporadically in both the medical and popular press until the 1980s, when the first concerted efforts to organize a medical response corps for disasters grew into the National Disaster Medical System. Simultaneous with this was the formation of a disaster and emergency medicine discussion and study group under the American Medical Association (AMA) in the United States as well as groups in Great Britain, Israel and other countries. By the time Hurricane Andrew struck Florida in 1992, the concept of disaster medicine was entrenched in public and governmental consciousness. Although training and fellowships in disaster medicine or related topics began graduating specialists in Europe and the United States as early as the 1980s, it was not until 2003 that the medical community embraced the need for the new specialty.

Throughout this period, incomplete and faltering medical responses to disaster events made it increasingly apparent in the United States of America that federal, state and local emergency management organizations were in need of a mechanism to identify qualified physicians in the face of a global upturn in the rate of disasters. Many physicians who volunteer at disasters have a bare minimum of knowledge in disaster medicine and often pose a hazard to themselves and the response effort because they have little or no field response training. It was against this backdrop that the American Academy of Disaster Medicine (AADM) and the American Board of Disaster Medicine (ABODM) were formed in the United States of America for the purpose of scholarly exchange and education in Disaster Medicine as well as the development of an examination demonstrating excellence towards board certification in this new specialty. In 2008, the United States National Library of Medicine (NLM) formed the Disaster Information Management Research Center (DIMRC) in support of the NLM's history of supporting healthcare professionals and information workers in accessing health information. DIMRC provides a specialized database, Disaster Lit: Database for Disaster Medicine and Public Health, an open access resource of disaster medicine documents, including guidelines, research reports, conference proceedings, fact sheets, training, fact sheets, and similar materials.

== Ethics in Disaster Medicine ==
The Disaster Medicine practitioner must be well-versed in the ethical dilemmas that commonly arise in disaster settings. One of the most common dilemmas occurs when the aggregate medical need exceeds the ability to provide a normal standard of care for all patients.

Triage

In the event of a future pandemic, the number of patients that require additional respiratory support will outnumber the number of available ventilators. Although a hypothetical example, similar natural disasters have occurred in the past. Historically, the influenza pandemic of 1918-19 and the more recent SARS epidemic in 2003 led to resource scarcity and necessitated triage. One paper estimated that in the United States, the need for ventilators would be double the number available in the setting of an influenza pandemic similar to the scale of 1918. In other countries with fewer resources, shortages are postulated to be even more severe.

How, then, is a clinician to decide whom to offer this treatment? Examples of common approaches that guide triage include "saving the most lives", calling for care to be provided to "the sickest first" or alternatively a "first come, first served" approach may attempt to sidestep the difficult decision of triage. Emergency services often use their own triaging systems to be able to work through some of these challenging situations; however, these guidelines often assume no resource scarcity, and therefore, different triaging systems must be developed for resource-limited, disaster response settings. Useful ethical approaches to guide the development of such triaging protocols are often based on the principles of the theories of utilitarianism, egalitarianism and proceduralism.

Utilitarian Approach

The Utilitarian theory works on the premise that the responder shall 'maximise collective welfare'; or in other words, 'do the greatest good for the greatest numbers of people'. The utilitarian will necessarily need a measure by which to assess the outcome of the intervention. This could be thought of through various ways, for instance: the number of lives saved, or the number of years of life saved through the intervention. Thus, the utilitarian would prioritize saving the youngest of the patients over the elderly or those who are more likely to die despite an intervention, in order to 'maximise the collective years of life saved'. Commonly used metrics to quantify utility of health interventions include DALYs (Disability Adjusted Life Years) and QALYs (Quality Adjusted Life Years) which take into account the potential number of years of life lost due to disability and the quality of the life that has been saved, respectively, in order to quantify the utility of the intervention.

Egalitarian Approach

Principles of egalitarianism suggest the distribution of scarce resources amongst all those in need irrespective of likely outcome. The egalitarian will place some emphasis on equality, and the way that this is achieved might differ. The guiding factor is need rather than the ultimate benefit or utility of the intervention. Approaches based on egalitarian principles are complex guides in disaster settings. In the words of Eyal (2016) "Depending on the exact variant of egalitarianism, the resulting limited priority may go to patients whose contemporaneous prognosis is dire (because their medical prospects are now poor), to patients who have lived with serious disabilities for years (because their lifetime health is worse), to young patients (because dying now would make them short-lived), to socioeconomically disadvantaged patients (because their welfare prospects and resources are lower), or to those who queued up first (because first-come first-served may be thought to express equal concern."

Procedural Approach

The inherent difficulties in triage may lead practitioners to attempt to minimize active selection or prioritization of patients in face of scarcity of resources, and instead rely upon guidelines which do not take into account medical need or possibility of positive outcomes. In this approach, known as proceduralism, selection or prioritization may be based on patient's inclusion in a particular group (for example, by citizenship, or membership within an organization such as health insurance group). This approach prioritizes simplification of the triage and transparency, although there are significant ethical drawbacks, especially when procedures favor those who are part of socioeconomically advantaged groups (such as those with health insurance). Procedural systems of triage emphasize certain patterns of decision making based on preferred procedures. This can take place in the form of a fair lottery for instance; or establishing transparent criteria for entry into hospitals - based on non discriminatory conditions. This is not outcome driven; it is a process driven activity aimed at providing consistent frameworks upon which to base decisions.

These are by no means the only systems upon which decisions are made, but provide a basic framework to evaluate the ethical reasoning behind what are often difficult choices during disaster response and management.

== Areas of competency ==
Internationally, disaster medicine specialists must demonstrate competency in areas of disaster healthcare and emergency management including but not limited to:

- Disaster behavioral health
- Disaster law
- Disaster planning
- Disaster preparation
- Disaster recovery
- Disaster response
- Disaster safety
- Medical consequences of disaster
- Medical consequences of terrorism
- Medical contingency planning
- Medical decontamination
- Medical implications of disaster
- Medical implications of terrorism
- Medical planning and preparation for disaster
- Medical planning and preparation for terrorism
- Medical recovery from disaster
- Medical recovery from terrorism
- Medical response to disaster
- Medical response to terrorism
- Medical response to weapons of mass destruction
- Medical surge, surge capacity and triage
- Psychosocial implications of disaster
- Psychosocial implications of terrorism
- Psychosocial triage

== Timeline ==
1755 - 1755 Lisbon Earthquake "What now? We bury the dead and heal the living."

1812 – Napoleonic Wars give rise to the military medical practice of triage in an effort to sort wounded soldiers in those to receive medical treatment and return to battle and those whose injuries are non-survivable. Dominique-Jean Larrey, a surgeon in the French emperor's army, not only conceives of taking care of the wounded on the battlefield, but creates the concept of ambulances, collecting the wounded in horse-drawn wagons and taking them to military hospitals.

1863 – International Red Cross founded in Geneva, Switzerland.

1873 – Clara Barton starts organization of the American Red Cross, drawing on her experiences during the American Civil War.

1881 – First American Red Cross chapter founded in Dansville, New York.

1937 – President Franklin Roosevelt makes a public request by commercial radio for medical aid following a natural gas explosion in New London, Texas. This is the first presidential request for disaster medical assistance in United States history.

1955 – Col. Karl H. Houghton, M.D. addresses a convention of military surgeons and introduces the concept of "disaster medicine."

1959 – Col. Joseph R. Schaeffer, M.D., reflecting the growing national concern over nuclear attacks on the United States civilian population, initiates training for civilian physicians in the treatment of mass casualties for the effects of weapons of mass destruction creating the concept of medical surge capacity.

1961 – The American Medical Association, the American Hospital Association, the American College of Surgeons, the United States Public Health Service, the United States Office of Civil Defense and the Department of Health, Education and Welfare join Schaeffer in advancing civilian physician training for mass casualty and weapons of mass destruction treatment.

1962 – The North Atlantic Treaty Organization (NATO) publishes an official disaster medicine manual edited by Schaeffer.

1984 – The United States Public Health Service forms the first federal disaster medical response team in Washington, D.C., designated PHS-1.

1986 – The United States Public Health System creates the National Disaster Medical System (NDMS) to provide disaster healthcare through National Medical Response Teams (NMRTs), Disaster Medical Assistance Teams (DMATs), Disaster Veterinary Assistance Teams (VMATs) and Disaster Mortuary Operational Response Teams (DMORTs). PH-1 becomes the first DMAT team.

1986 – A disaster medical response discussion group is created by NDMS team members and emergency medicine organizations in the United States. Healthcare professionals worldwide join the discussion group of the years to come.

1989 – The University of New Mexico creates the Center for Disaster Medicine, the first such medical center of excellence in the United States. Elsewhere in the world, similar centers are created at universities in London, Paris, Brussels and Bordeaux.

1992 – Hurricane Andrew, a Category 5 hurricane, strikes south Florida, destroying the city of Homestead, Florida and initiating the largest disaster healthcare response to date.

1993 – On February 26, 1993, at 12:17 pm, a terrorist attack on the North Tower of the World Trade Center (the first such attack on United States soil since World War II) increases interest in specialized education and training on disaster response for civilian physicians.

1998 – The American College of Contingency Planners (ACCP) is formed by the American Academy of Medical Administrators (AAMA) to provide certification and scholarly study in the area of medical contingency planning and healthcare disaster planning.

2001 – The September 11, 2001 attacks on the World Trade Center and the Pentagon cause the largest loss of life resulting from an attack on American targets on United States soil since Pearl Harbor. As a result, the need for disaster medicine is galvanized.

2001 – On October 29, 2001, President George W. Bush issues Homeland Security Presidential Directive 1 (HSPD-1), establishing the organization and operation of the Homeland Security Council.

2002 – On March 11, 2002, President Bush issues HSPD-3, establishing the Homeland Security Advisory System.

2002 – On December 11, 2002, President Bush issues HSPD-4, outlining the National Strategy to Combat Weapons of Mass Destruction

2003 – The American Medical Association, in conjunction with the Medical College of Georgia and the University of Texas, debuts the National Disaster Life Support (NDLS) training program, providing the first national certification in disaster medicine skills and education. NDLS training would later be referred to as "the CPR of the 21st century."

2003 – In February 2003, the American Association of Physician Specialists (AAPS) appoints an expert panel to explore the question of whether disaster medicine qualifies as a medical specialty.

2003 – On February 28, 2003, President Bush issues HSPD-5 outlining the system for management of domestic incidents (man-made and natural disasters). HSPD-5 mandates the creation and adoption of the National Response Plan (NRP).

2003 – On September 30, 2003, the National Response Plan is published and adopted by all Federal agencies.

2003 – On December 17, 2003, President Bush issues HSPD-8, outlining the new framework for national preparedness and creating the National Incident Management System (NIMS).

2004 – In February, 2004 the AAPS reports to the American Board of Physician Specialties (ABPS) that the expert panel, supported by the available literature and recent HSPDs, has determined that there is a sufficient body of unique knowledge in disaster medicine to designate the field as a discrete specialty. ABPS empanels a board of certification to determine if board certification is appropriate in this new specialty.

2004 – On April 28, 2004, President Bush issues HSPD-10, also known as the plan for Biodefense for the 21st Century which calls for healthcare to implement surveillance and response capabilities to combat the threat of terrorism.

2004 – Hurricanes Charlie, Frances, Ivan and Jeanne batter the state of Florida, resulting in the largest disaster medical response since Hurricane Andrew.

2005 – Hurricane Katrina batters the Gulf Coast of the United States, destroying multiple coastal cities. For the first time in NDMS history, the entire NDMS system is deployed for a single disaster medical response. Among the many lessons learned in field operations following Hurricane Katrina are the need for cellular autonomy under a central incident command structure and the creation of continuous integrated triage for the management of massive patient surge. The lessons learned in the Hurricane Katrina response would be applied less than a month later following Hurricane Rita and again following Hurricane Wilma and the Indonesian tsunami.

2005 – In late October 2005, the American Board of Disaster Medicine (ABODM) and the American Academy of Disaster Medicine (AADM) are formed for scholarly study, discussion, and exchange in the field of disaster medicine, as well as to oversee board certification in disaster medicine.

2006 – In June 2006, the Institute of Medicine publishes three reports on the state of emergency Health care in the United States. Among the condemnations of emergency care is the lack of substantial improvement in disaster preparedness, or "cross-silo" coordination.

2006 – On September 17, 2006, the NIMS Integration Center publishes the NIMS Implementation Plan for Hospitals and Healthcare, establishing a September 30, 2007 deadline for all hospitals and healthcare facilities to be "NIMS-compliant."

2007 – On January 31, 2007, President Bush issues HSPD-18, calling for the development and deployment of medical countermeasures against weapons of mass destruction.

2007 – On September 30, 2007, the NIMS Implementation Plan for Hospitals and Healthcare Facilities compliance deadline passes with fewer than nine percent of all United States hospitals fully compliant and fewer than half of hospitals and healthcare facilities having made substantial progress towards compliance.

2007 – On October 18, 2007, President Bush issues HSPD-21, outlining an augmented plan for public health and disaster medical preparedness. HSPD-21 specifically calls for the creation of the discipline of "disaster healthcare" using the accepted definition of "disaster medicine." HSPD-21 also calls on the Secretary of Health and Human Services (HHS) to use "economic incentives" including the Center for Medicare Services (CMS) to induce private medical organizations, hospitals and healthcare facilities to implement disaster healthcare programs and medical disaster preparedness programs. Establishment of the National Center for Disaster Medicine and Public Health (NCDMPH) with Founding Partners, Department of Homeland Security, Department of Defense, Department of Health and Human Services, Department of Veterans' Affairs, and Department of Transportation.

== Board certification ==
Physicians who hold board certification in disaster medicine have demonstrated by written and simulator-based examination that through training and field experience, they have mastered the spectrum of knowledge and skills which defines the specialty of disaster medicine. As with all medical specialties, this body of knowledge and skills is contained in the core competencies document created and maintained by the American Board of Disaster Medicine and the American Academy of Disaster Medicine. As with all core competencies documents, the specific knowledge and skills required for certification are subject to constant refinement and evolution. This statement cannot be more true than for a specialty like disaster medicine where the nature of the threats faced, the responses undertaken, and the lessons learned become more complex with each event.
