= Board of Certification in Family Medicine Obstetrics =

Board of Certification in Family Medicine Obstetrics can be achieved through the American Board of Physician Specialties, and is currently the only organization offering board certification in the medical specialty of family medicine obstetrics in the United States.

Board of Certification in Family Medicine Obstetrics allows physicians who are initially residency-trained in family medicine, and who subsequently have completed a fellowship in family medicine obstetrics, to become board-certified in family medicine obstetrics. Board certification requires completion of an approved fellowship, preparation of case reports for review by the board, and passing both written and oral examinations. Recertification is required every 8 years. The board is a member of the American Board of Physician Specialties - an organization that allows both Doctors of Medicine and Doctors of Osteopathic Medicine to become members.

== See also ==
- American Board of Physician Specialties
- American Association of Physician Specialists
- Board certification
- Fellowship (medicine)
