= Board of Certification in Emergency Medicine =

The Board of Certification in Emergency Medicine (BCEM) can be achieved through the American Board of Physician Specialties, and is the second-largest organization offering board certification in the medical specialty of emergency medicine in the United States.

BCEM allows physicians who were not initially residency-trained in emergency medicine, but that have completed a residency in other fields (internists, family practitioners, pediatricians, general surgeons, and anesthesiologists), to become board-certified in emergency medicine. BCEM requires five years of full-time emergency medicine experience or completion of an approved fellowship, preparation of case reports for review by the board, and passing both written and oral examinations before allowing a candidate to become board-certified in emergency medicine. Recertification is required every 8 years. BCEM is a member of the American Board of Physician Specialties (ABPS) - an organization that allows both M.D.s and D.O.s to become members.

== See also ==
- American Board of Physician Specialties
- American Association of Physician Specialists
- Board certification
- Fellowship (medicine)
