= American Board of Disaster Medicine =

Disaster medicine as a specialty and mindset was not only a reaction from September 11, 2001, but to the numerous subsequent events that seemed to all too quickly follow: random anthrax attacks, the SARS outbreak, the New York City blackout in the summer of 2003, the December 26, 2004 Indian Ocean earthquake and tsunami, the Pakistan earthquake of 2005, tumultuous hurricane seasons in 2004 and 2005 (including Hurricane Katrina) and, of course, terrorist attacks throughout the world — all against a backdrop of conflict in Afghanistan and Iraq.

The medical establishment in North America and the United Kingdom began forming study and discussion groups in disaster medicine. In some cases, the medical schools were on the front lines of this movement. Meanwhile, courses and fellowships in disaster medicine related fields at universities in London, Paris, Brussels, Bordeaux and the United States have been in existence since the early 1980s.

Throughout this period, incomplete and faltering medical responses to disaster events made it increasingly apparent that federal, state and local emergency management organizations were in need of a mechanism to identify qualified physicians in the face of a global upturn in the rate of natural and man-made disasters. Many physicians who volunteer at disasters have a bare minimum of knowledge in disaster medicine and often pose a hazard to themselves and the response effort because they have little or no field response training. It was against this backdrop that the American Academy of Disaster Medicine (AADM) and the American Board of Disaster Medicine (ABODM) were formed for the purpose of scholarly exchange and education in Disaster Medicine as well as the development of an examination demonstrating excellence towards Board Certification in this new specialty.

== History ==
In February 2003, prior to formation of the AADM and ABODM, the American Association of Physician Specialists (AAPS) commissioned an expert panel to undertake a scholarly review of the literature and survey the recognized experts in disaster management, emergency management, medical contingency planning, emergency medicine, public health, disaster behavioral health and military medicine to determine if such a unique body of knowledge and skills existed. By February 2004 it was determined that the majority of experts, supported by the available literature, agreed that there is a unique body of core knowledge and skills to define the specialty of Disaster Medicine and a broader body of knowledge needed by all healthcare practitioners responding to a disaster event.

From February 2004 through October, 2005 further research was compiled into a body of unique knowledge known as a Core competencies document. By January 2005, it was evident that the National Disaster Life Support Educational Consortium (NDLSEC) and the American Medical Association (AMA) were similarly compiling the body of knowledge needed by all healthcare professionals responding to a disaster. As the purpose of the Disaster Medicine Core Competencies was to define the core body of knowledge required to demonstrate proficiency in Disaster Medicine towards physician board certification in the specialty, the Disaster Medicine Core Competency document reflects that bias.

== Public Board Member ==
On March 23, 2009, the American Board of Disaster Medicine (ABODM) announced the appointment of U.S. Marine Corps Major General James L. Williams as its Public Board Member.

The American Board of Physician Specialties (ABPS) is the first and only nationally recognized physician multispecialty certifying body that has public members on its boards of certification. Their public members have the same rights and responsibilities as the physician members including full voting powers.

The first officers of the American Board of Disaster Medicine included:

- Founding Chairperson for ABODM: Dr. Maurice A. Ramirez, DO, BCDM, BCEM, CNS, CMRO
- Founding Vice-chair for ABODM: Dr. David M. McCann, MD, BCDM, BCEM, FAAFM
- Founding President for AADM: Dr. Lewis Marshall, MD, JD, BCDM, BCEM, FAAEM
- Founding Secretary for AADM: Dr. Heidi Cordi, MD, BCDM, FACEP
