= Medical specialty =

Branch of medicine concerning a specific group of diseases or population

A medical specialty is a branch of medical practice that is focused on a defined group of patients, diseases, skills, or philosophy. Examples include those branches of medicine that deal exclusively with children (pediatrics), cancer (oncology), laboratory medicine (e.g. pathology), or primary care (family medicine). After completing medical school or another form of basic training, physicians or surgeons and other clinicians usually further their medical education in a specific specialty of medicine by completing a multiple-year residency to become a specialist.

== History ==
To a certain extent, medical practitioners have long been specialized. According to Galen, specialization was common among Roman physicians. The particular system of modern medical specialties evolved gradually during the 19th century. Informal social recognition of medical specialization evolved before the formal legal system. The particular subdivision of the practice of medicine into various specialties varies from country to country, and is somewhat arbitrary.

== Classification ==
Medical specialties can be classified along several axes. These are:

- Surgical or internal medicine
- Age range of patients
- Diagnostic or therapeutic
- Organ-based or technique-based

Throughout history, the most important has been the division into surgical and internal medicine specialties. The surgical specialties are those in which an important part of diagnosis and treatment is achieved through major surgical techniques. The internal medicine specialties are the specialties in which the main diagnosis and treatment is never major surgery. In some countries, anesthesiology is classified as a surgical discipline, since it is vital in the surgical process, though anesthesiologists never perform major surgery themselves.

Many specialties are organ-based. Many symptoms and diseases come from a particular organ. Others are based mainly around a set of techniques, such as radiology, which was originally based around X-rays.

The age range of patients seen by any given specialist can be quite variable. Pediatricians handle most complaints and diseases in children that do not require surgery, and there are several subspecialties (formally or informally) in pediatrics that mimic the organ-based specialties in adults. Pediatric surgery may or may not be a separate specialty that handles some kinds of surgical complaints in children.

A further subdivision is the diagnostic versus therapeutic specialties. While the diagnostic process is of great importance in all specialties, some specialists perform mainly or only diagnostic examinations, such as pathology, clinical neurophysiology, and radiology. This line is becoming somewhat blurred with interventional radiology, an evolving field that uses image expertise to perform minimally invasive procedures.

== Specialties that are common worldwide ==
Specialty	May be subspecialty of	Age range of patients	Diagnostic (D) or therapeutic (T) specialty	Surgical (S) or internal medicine (I) specialty	Organ-based (O) or technique-based (T)
Allergy and immunology	Internal medicine Pediatrics	All	Both	I	O
Adolescent medicine	Pediatrics; Family medicine	Pediatric	Both	I	T
Anesthesiology	None	All	T	Both	Both
Aerospace medicine	Family Medicine	All	Both	Neither	Both
Bariatrics	Several	All	Both	Both	Both
Cardiology	Internal medicine	Adults	T	I	O
Cardiothoracic surgery	General surgery	Adults	T	S	O
Child and adolescent psychiatry	Psychiatry	Pediatric	T	I	T
Clinical neurophysiology	Neurology	All	D	I	Both
Colorectal surgery	General surgery	All	Both	S	O
Dermatology	None	All	T	I	O
Developmental pediatrics	Pediatrics	Pediatric	T	I	Neither
Emergency medicine	Family medicine	All	Both	Both	Both
Endocrinology	Internal medicine	Adults	Both	I	Multidisciplinary
Family medicine	None	All	Both	Both	Multidisciplinary
Forensic pathology	Pathology	All	D	Neither	T
Forensic psychiatry	Psychiatry	All	D	I	T
Gastroenterology	Internal medicine	Adults	T	I	O
General surgery	None	Adults	T	S	T
Surgical oncology	General surgery Oncology	Adults	T	S	T
Geriatrics	Family medicine Internal medicine	Geriatric	T	I	Multidisciplinary
Geriatric psychiatry	Geriatrics; Psychiatry	Geriatric	T	I	Neither
Gynecologic oncology	Obstetrics and gynecology	All	T	S	O
Hematology	Internal medicine	Adults	Both	I	Neither
Hematologic pathology	Hematology; Pathology	All	D	Neither	T
Infectious disease	Internal medicine Pediatrics	All	Both	I	Neither
Internal medicine	None	Adults	Both	I	Neither
Interventional radiology	Radiology	All	Both	-	Multidisciplinary
Intensive care medicine	Anesthesiology; Emergency medicine Internal medicine	All	T	Both	Both
Maternal-fetal medicine	Obstetrics and gynecology	Adults	T	S	Both
Medical biochemistry	Internal medicine	All	D	I	Neither
Medical genetics	None	All	D	I	Neither
Medical oncology	Internal medicine	Adults	Both	I	Neither
Neonatology	Pediatrics	Neonatal	T	I	Neither
Nephrology	Internal medicine	All	T	I	O
Neurology	Internal medicine	All	Both	I	O
Neuropathology	Pathology	All	D	Neither	T
Neuropsychiatry	Psychiatry	All	Both	I	T
Neurosurgery	None	All	T	S	O
Nuclear medicine (nucleology)	None	All	Both	I	T
Obstetrics and gynecology	Family medicine	All	T	S	O
Occupational medicine	Family medicine Internal medicine	Adults	T	I	Multidisciplinary
Ophthalmology	None	All	T	S	O
Orthopedic surgery	None	All	T	S	O
Oral and maxillofacial surgery	None	All	T	S	O
Otorhinolaryngology	None	All	T	S	O
Palliative care	Family medicine Emergency medicine Internal medicine Pediatrics	All	Both	Neither	Neither
Pathology	None	All	D	Neither	T
Pediatrics	None	Pediatric	Both	I	Neither
Pediatric allergy and immunology	Pediatrics; Allergy and immunology	Pediatric	T	I	O
Pediatric cardiology	Pediatrics; Cardiology	Pediatric	T	I	O
Pediatric emergency medicine	Pediatrics; Emergency medicine	Pediatric	Both	Both	Both
Pediatric endocrinology	Pediatrics; Endocrinology	Pediatric	Both	I	Multidisciplinary
Pediatric gastroenterology	Pediatrics; Gastroenterology	Pediatric	T	I	O
Pediatric hematology and oncology	Pediatrics; Hematology; Oncology	Pediatric	T	I	O
Pediatric infectious disease	Pediatrics; Infectious disease	Pediatric	T	I	O
Pediatric nephrology	Pediatrics; Nephrology	Pediatric	T	I	O
Pediatric respiratory medicine	Pediatrics; Respiratory medicine	Pediatric	T	I	O
Pediatric rheumatology	Pediatrics; Rheumatology	Pediatric	T	I	O
Pediatric surgery	General surgery	Pediatric	T	S	O
Physical medicine and rehabilitation	None	All	T	I	Multidisciplinary
Plastic, reconstructive and aesthetic surgery	General surgery	All	T	S	O
Post-hospitalist	Internal medicine	All	Both	I	T
Psychiatry	Family medicine	All	Both	I	T
Public health	Family medicine	All	Neither	Neither	T
Radiation oncology	None	All	T	Neither	T
Radiology	None	All	Both	I	T
Reproductive endocrinology and infertility	Obstetrics and gynecology	Adults	T	S	T
Pulmunology or Respiratory medicine	Internal medicine	Adults	T	I	O
Rheumatology	Internal medicine	Adults	T	I	Neither
Sports medicine	Family medicine	All	Both	Neither	Multidisciplinary
Thoracic surgery	General surgery	Adults	T	S	T
Toxicology	Emergency Medicine	All	Both	Neither	O
Transfusion Medicine	Hematology	All	Both	Neither	Both
Neuroradiology	Radiology	All	Both	I	Both
Urology	None	All	T	S	O
Vascular surgery	General surgery	All	T	S	O

== List of specialties recognized in the European Union and European Economic Area ==
The European Union publishes a list of specialties recognized in the European Union, and by extension, the European Economic Area. There is substantial overlap between some of the specialties and it is likely that for example "Clinical radiology" and "Radiology" refer to a large degree to the same pattern of practice across Europe.

- Accident and emergency medicine
- Allergist
- Anaesthetics
- Cardiology
- Child psychiatry
- Clinical biology
- Clinical chemistry
- Clinical microbiology
- Clinical neurophysiology
- Craniofacial surgery
- Dermatology
- Endocrinology
- Family and General Medicine
- Gastroenterologic surgery
- Gastroenterology
- General Practice
- General surgery
- Geriatrics
- Hematology
- Immunology
- Infectious diseases
- Internal medicine
- Laboratory medicine
- Nephrology
- Neuropsychiatry
- Neurology
- Neurosurgery
- Nuclear medicine
- Obstetrics and gynaecology
- Occupational medicine
- Oncology
- Ophthalmology
- Oral and maxillofacial surgery
- Orthopaedics
- Otorhinolaryngology
- Paediatric surgery
- Paediatrics
- Pathology
- Pharmacology
- Physical medicine and rehabilitation
- Plastic surgery
- Podiatric surgery
- Preventive medicine
- Psychiatry
- Public health
- Radiation Oncology
- Radiology
- Respiratory medicine
- Rheumatology
- Stomatology
- Thoracic surgery
- Tropical medicine
- Urology
- Vascular surgery
- Venereology

== List of North American medical specialties and others ==
In this table, as in many healthcare arenas, medical specialties are organized into the following groups:

- Surgical specialties focus on manually operative and instrumental techniques to treat disease.
- Medical specialties that focus on the diagnosis and non-surgical treatment of disease.
- Diagnostic specialties focus more purely on diagnosis of disorders.

Specialty	Code	Group	Sub-specialties	Focus
Allergy and immunology				Allergic reactions, asthma, and the immune system.
Anesthesiology	AN, PAN	Surgery	Pediatric anesthesia; Pain management; Intensive care; Critical care; Obstetrics and gynaecology; Cardiothoracic anesthesiology; Trauma care; Pre- and Post-Operative Assessment and Care; Generalist (covers all the sub-specialties)	Anesthesia
Bariatrics				Deals with the causes, prevention, and treatment of obesity.
Cardiology		Medicine	Interventional cardiology; Echocardiography; Electrocardiography; Sports cardiology; Cardiogeriatrics; Preventive cardiology and Cardiac Rehabilitation; Pediatric cardiology	Disease of the cardiovascular system.
Cardiovascular surgery		Surgery		The operation of heart and major blood vessels of the chest.
Clinical laboratory sciences		Diagnostic	Transfusion medicine is concerned with the transfusion of blood and blood component, including the maintenance of a "blood bank".; Cellular pathology is concerned with diagnosis using samples from patients taken as tissues and cells using histology and cytology.; Clinical chemistry is concerned with diagnosis by making biochemical analysis of blood, body fluids, and tissues.; Hematology is concerned with diagnosis by looking at changes in the cellular composition of the blood and bone marrow as well as the coagulation system in the blood.; Clinical microbiology is concerned with the in vitro diagnosis of diseases caused by bacteria, viruses, fungi, and parasites.; Clinical immunology is concerned with disorders of the immune system and related body defenses. It also deals with diagnosis of allergy.	Application of diagnostic techniques in medical laboratories such as assays, microscope analysis.
Dermatology	D, DS	Medicine	Dermatology, Mohs surgery	Skin and its appendages (hair, nails, sweat glands etc.).
Dietetics	RD			Food and nutrition
Emergency medicine	EM	Medicine	Disaster medicine; Emergency medical services; Hospice and palliative medicine; International Emergency Medicine and Global Health; Medical toxicology; Pediatric emergency medicine; Research; Simulation; Sports medicine; Toxicology; Ultrasound; Undersea and hyperbaric medicine; Wilderness medicine	The initial management of emergent medical conditions, often in hospital emergency departments or the field.
Endocrinology		Medicine		The endocrine system (i.e., endocrine glands and hormones) and its diseases, including diabetes and thyroid diseases.
Family medicine	FM	Medicine	Addiction medicine; Adolescent medicine; Anesthesia; Emergency medicine; Care of the elderly (geriatric medicine); Clinical environmental health; Global health; HIV care; Hospital medicine; Indigenous health; Low-risk obstetrics; Medical education; Medical oncology; Medical simulation; Pain medicine; Palliative care; Point of Care Ultrasound (POCUS); Research; Sleep medicine; Sports and exercise medicine; Women's health	Continuing, comprehensive healthcare for the individual and family, integrating the biological, clinical and behavioral sciences to treat patients of all ages, sexes, organ systems, and diseases.
Forensic medicine		Medicine		
Gastroenterology	GI	Medicine		The alimentary tract
General surgery	GS	Surgery	Colorectal surgery; Gastrointestinal surgery; Transplant surgery; Trauma surgery	
Geriatrics	IMG	Medicine		Elderly patients
Gynecology				Female reproductive health
Hepatology		Medicine		The liver and biliary tract, usually a part of gastroenterology.
Hospital medicine		Medicine		
Infectious disease	ID	Medicine		Diseases caused by biological agents.
Intensive care medicine		Medicine		Life support and management of critically ill patients, often in an ICU.
Internal medicine		Medicine		
Medical research			Anatomy, Biochemistry, Embryology, Genetics, Pharmacology, Toxicology	Care of hospitalized patients
Nephrology		Medicine		Kidney diseases
Neurology	N	Medicine	Behavioral neurology; Clinical neurophysiology; Geriatric neurology; Headache medicine; Neuromuscular medicine; Neurodevelopmental disabilities; Neuro-oncology; Neuroradiology; Vascular neurology; Hospice and palliative medicine; Pain medicine; Sleep medicine	Diseases involving the central, peripheral, and autonomic nervous systems.
Neurosurgery	NS	Surgery	Cerebrovascular; Neurosurgical oncology; Stereotactic and functional; Spine; Neurotrauma; Skull base; Peripheral nerve; Pediatric neurosurgery	Disease of the central nervous system, peripheral nervous system, and spinal column.
Obstetrics and gynecology	OB/GYN	Surgery	Maternal-fetal medicine; Reproductive medicine; Fertility medicine; Gynecologic oncology	
Oncology	ON	Medicine	Radiation oncology – pertains to the use of radiation therapy (the medical use of ionizing radiation) as part of cancer treatment to control malignant cells (not to be confused with radiology).	Cancer and other malignant diseases, often grouped with hematology.
Ophthalmology	OPH	Surgery	Anterior segment surgery; Cornea; Glaucoma; Neuro-ophthalmology; Ocular oncology; Oculoplastics and Orbital surgery; Ophthalmic pathology; Pediatric ophthalmology/strabismus; Refractive surgery; Medical retina; Uveitis; Vitreo-retinal surgery	Diseases of the visual pathways, including the eyes, brain, etc.
Oral and maxillofacial surgery	Maxfacs, OMS	Surgery	Oral and Craniofacial surgery (Head and neck); Facial cosmetic surgery; Craniomaxillofacial trauma	Disease of the head, neck, face, jaws and the hard and soft tissues of the oral and maxillofacial region.
Orthopedic surgery	ORS	Surgery	Hand surgery, surgical sports medicine, adult reconstruction, spine surgery, foot and ankle, musculoskeletal oncology, orthopedic trauma surgery, pediatric orthopedic surgery	Injury and disease of the musculoskeletal system.
Otorhinolaryngology, or ENT	ORL, ENT	Surgery	Head and neck, facial cosmetic surgery, Neurotology, Laryngology	Treatment of ear, nose, and throat disorders. The term head and neck surgery defines a closely related specialty that is concerned mainly with the surgical management of cancer of the same anatomical structures.
Palliative care	PLM	Medicine		A relatively modern branch of clinical medicine that deals with pain and symptom relief and emotional support in patients with terminal illnesses including cancer and heart failure.
Pathology	PTH	Diagnostic		Understanding disease through examination of molecules, cells, tissues and organs. The term encompasses both the medical specialty that uses tissues and body fluids to obtain clinically useful information and the related scientific study of disease processes.
Pediatrics	PD	Medicine	Children. Like internal medicine, pediatrics has many sub-specialties for specific age ranges, organ systems, disease classes, and sites of care delivery. Most sub-specialties of adult medicine have a pediatric equivalent such as pediatric cardiology, pediatric emergency medicine, pediatric endocrinology, pediatric gastroenterology, pediatric hematology, pediatric oncology, pediatric ophthalmology, and neonatology.	Deals with the medical care of infants, children, and adolescents (from newborn to age 16–21, depending on the country).
Pediatric surgery		Surgery	Treats a wide variety of thoracic and abdominal (and sometimes urologic) diseases of childhood.	
Physical medicine and rehabilitation Or Physiatry	PM&R	Medicine	Cancer Rehabilitation; Pain Management; Traumatic Brain Injury; Spinal Cord Injury; Sports Medicine; Pediatrics; Hospice & Palliative Medicine	Concerned with functional improvement after injury, illness, or congenital disorders.
Plastic surgery	PS	Surgery	Cosmetic surgery; Burn; Microsurgery; Hand surgery; Craniofacial surgery	Elective cosmetic surgery as well as reconstructive surgery after traumatic or operative mutilation.
Podiatry	POD	Surgery	Forefoot surgery; Midfoot surgery; Rearfoot surgery; Ankle surgery; Soft tissue leg surgery	Elective podiatric surgery of the foot and ankle, lower limb diabetic wound and salvation, peripheral vascular disease limb preservation, lower limb mononeuropathy conditions. Reconstructive foot & ankle surgery.
Proctology	PRO	Medicine		(or colorectal surgery) treats disease in the rectum, anus, and colon.
Psychiatry	P	Medicine	Addiction psychiatry focuses on substance abuse and its treatment.; Child and adolescent psychiatry focuses on the care of children and adolescents with mental, emotional, and learning problems including ADHD, autism, and family conflicts.; Consultation-Liaison psychiatry focuses on the interface between general medicine and psychiatry.; Forensic psychiatry focuses on the interface of psychiatry and law.; Geriatric psychiatry focuses on the care of elderly people with mental illnesses including dementias, post-stroke cognitive changes, and depression.; Neuropsychiatry focuses on affective, cognitive and behavioral disorders attributable to diseases of the nervous system; Sleep medicine focuses on the diagnosis and treatment of sleep disorders.; Hospice and Palliative Medicine; Pain medicine	The bio-psycho-social study of the etiology, diagnosis, treatment and prevention of cognitive, perceptual, emotional and behavioral disorders. Related fields include psychotherapy and clinical psychology.
Pulmonology		Medicine		The lungs and respiratory system. Pulmonology is generally considered a branch of internal medicine, although it is closely related to intensive care medicine when dealing with patients requiring mechanical ventilation.
Public Health				Public health focuses on the health of populations. Physicians employed in this field work in policy, research or health promotion, taking a broad view of health that encompasses the social determinants of health.
Radiology	R, DR	Diagnostic and Therapeutic	Interventional radiology is concerned with using expert imaging of the human body, usually via CT, ultrasound, fluoroscopy, or MRI to perform a breadth of intravascular procedures (angioplasty, arterial stenting, thrombolysis, uterine fibroid embolization), biopsies and minimally invasive oncologic procedures (radiofrequency and cryoablation of tumors & transarterial chemoembolization); Nuclear medicine uses radioactive substances for in vivo and in vitro diagnosis either using imaging of the location of radioactive substances placed into a patient or using in vitro diagnostic tests utilizing radioactive substances.	The use of expertise in radiation in the context of medical imaging for diagnosis or image guided minimally invasive therapy. X-rays, etc.
Rheumatology	RHU	Medicine		Autoimmune and inflammatory diseases of the joints and other organ systems, such as arthritis and other rheumatic diseases.
Surgical oncology	SO	Surgery		Curative and palliative surgical approaches to cancer treatment.
Thoracic surgery	TS	Surgery		Surgery of the organs of the thoracic cavity: the heart, lungs, and great vessels.
Transplant surgery	TTS	Surgery		Transplantation of organs from one body to another.
Toxicology		Diagnostic and Therapeutic	Environmental; Forensic; Occupational; Pediatric	Poisonings, Overdoses; Environmental, and Occupational Exposures
Urgent Care Medicine	UCM	Medicine		Immediate medical care offering outpatient care for the treatment of acute and chronic illness and injury.
Urology	U	Surgery		Urinary tracts of males and females, and the male reproductive system. It is often practiced together with andrology ("men's health").
Vascular surgery	VS	Surgery		The peripheral blood vessels – those outside the chest (usually operated on by cardiovascular surgeons) and outside the central nervous system (treated by neurosurgery).

== Salaries ==
According to the 2022 Medscape Physician Compensation Report, physicians on average earn $339K annually. Primary care physicians earn $260K annually while specialists earned $368K annually.

The table below details the average range of salaries for physicians in the US of medical specialties:

Specialty	Average salary (USD)	Average hours work/week	Average salary/hour (USD)
Allergy and Immunology	$298K		
Anesthesiology	$405K	59	
Dermatology	$438K	44	103
Emergency medicine	$373K	44	180
Endocrinology	$257K		
Cardiac surgery	218,684 to $500,000		
Cardiology	$490K	55	
Critical care	$369K		
Infectious disease	$260K		
Internal medicine	$264K	55	58
Family medicine	$255K	51	58
Nephrology	$329K		
Neurology	$301K	54	93
Obstetrics and gynecology	$336K	59	83
Oncology	$411K		
Ophthalmology	$417K	45	
Orthopedic surgery	$557K	56	
Otolaryngology	$469K	52	
Oral and maxillofacial surgery	360,000 to $625,210	53	
Pathology	$334K	44	
Pediatrics	244K	52	69
Rheumatology	$289K		
Physical medicine and rehabilitation	$322K		
Preventative medicine	$243K		
Pulmonary medicine	$353K	55	
Psychiatry	$287K	46	72
Radiology	$437K	56	
General surgery	$402K	58	
Urology	$461K	59	
Neurosurgery	350,000 to $705,000		132
Plastic surgery	$576K		114
Gastroenterology	$453K	55	93

== By country ==
=== Australia and New Zealand ===
There are 15 recognised specialty medical Colleges in Australia. The majority of these are Australasian Colleges and therefore also oversee New Zealand specialist doctors. These Colleges are:

Specialist college	Major subspecialties	Approximate number of specialist doctors/trainees
Australasian College for Emergency Medicine	Emergency medicine	5,000
Australasian College of Dermatologists		700
Australasian College of Sport and Exercise Physicians	Exercise medicine	350
Australian and New Zealand College of Anaesthetists	Pain medicine	7,000
Australian College of Rural and Remote Medicine		4,500
College of Intensive Care Medicine	Intensive care	1,200
Royal Australasian College of Medical Administrators		800
Royal Australasian College of Physicians	Addiction medicine, adolescent and young adult medicine, cardiology, clinical genetics, clinical haematology, clinical pharmacology, community child health, endocrinology, gastroenterology, general and acute care medicine, general paediatrics geriatric medicine, haematology, infectious diseases, immunology and allergy, neonatal and perinatal medicine, nephrology, neurology, nuclear medicine, occupational medicine, oncology, paediatric emergency medicine, palliative medicine, public health, rehabilitation, respiratory and sleep medicine, rheumatology, sexual health	28,000
Royal Australasian College of Surgeons	Cardiothoracic, general surgery, head & neck, neurosurgery, orthopaedics, paediatric surgery, plastics, urology, vascular	9,000
Royal Australian and New Zealand College of Obstetricians and Gynaecologists	Obstetrics, gynaecology, fertility medicine, obstetric ultrasound, gynaecological oncology, urogynaecology	2,500
Royal Australian and New Zealand College of Ophthalmologists		1,100
Royal Australian and New Zealand College of Psychiatrists		5,000
Royal Australian and New Zealand College of Radiologists	Diagnostic, interventional, ultrasound, nuclear medicine	3,500
Royal Australian College of General Practitioners		40,000
Royal College of Pathologists of Australasia	Anatomical, chemical, clinical, forensic, genetic, haematological, immunological, microbiological pathology	1,000

The Royal Australasian College of Dental Surgeons supervises training of specialist medical practitioners specializing in oral and maxillofacial surgery in addition to its role in the training of dentists. There are approximately 260 faciomaxillary surgeons in Australia.

The Royal New Zealand College of General Practitioners is a distinct body from the Australian Royal Australian College of General Practitioners. There are approximately 5100 members of the RNZCGP.

Within some of the larger colleges, there are sub-faculties, such as: Australasian Faculty of Rehabilitation Medicine within the Royal Australasian College of Physicians.

There are some collegiate bodies in Australia that are not officially recognised as specialties by the Australian Medical Council but have a college structure for members, such as: Australasian College of Physical Medicine

There are some collegiate bodies in Australia of allied health non-medical practitioners with specialisation. They are not recognised as medical specialists, but can be treated as such by private health insurers, such as: Australasian College of Podiatric Surgeons

=== Canada ===
Specialty training in Canada is overseen by the Royal College of Physicians and Surgeons of Canada and the College of Family Physicians of Canada. For specialists working in the province of Quebec, the Collège des médecins du Québec also oversees the process.

=== Germany ===
In Germany these doctors use the term Facharzt.

=== India ===
Specialty training in India is overseen by the National Medical Commission (formerly Medical Council of India), responsible for recognition of post graduate training and by the National Board of Examinations. Education of Ayurveda in overseen by Central Council of Indian Medicine (CCIM), the council conducts UG and PG courses all over India, while Central Council of Homoeopathy does the same in the field of Homeopathy.

Specialization and superspecialization in medicine and surgery are pursued after completing MBBS, for which higher medical (MD, DM) and surgical (MS, MCh) degrees are awarded. The following medical and surgical specialties and superspecialties are recognized by the National Medical Commission (formerly Medical Council of India) and National Board of Examinations in Medical Sciences:

- Aerospace medicine
- Allergy and clinical immunology
- Anaesthesiology
- Anatomy
- Biochemistry
- Cardiac anaesthesia
- Cardiology
- Cardiovascular and thoracic surgery
- Child and adolescent psychiatry
- Clinical haematology
- Clinical immunology and rheumatology
- Clinical pharmacology
- Critical care medicine
- Community medicine
- Dermatology, venereology and leprosy
- Emergency medicine
- Endocrine surgery
- Endocrinology
- Family medicine
- Forensic medicine and toxicology
- General medicine
- General surgery
- Geriatrics
- Geriatric mental health
- Gynaecologic oncology
- Hand surgery
- Head and neck surgery
- Health administration
- Health education
- Hepatology
- Hepatopancreatobiliary surgery
- Hospital administration
- Immunohematology
- Infectious diseases
- Interventional radiology
- Laboratory medicine
- Marine medicine
- Maternal and child health
- Medical gastroenterology
- Medical genetics
- Medical oncology
- Microbiology
- Neonatology
- Nephrology
- Nuclear medicine
- Neuroanaesthesia
- Neurology
- Neuroradiology
- Neurosurgery
- Obstetrics and gynaecology
- Occupational health
- Oncopathology
- Ophthalmology
- Organ transplant anaesthesia and critical care
- Orthopaedics
- Otorhinolaryngology
- Palliative medicine
- Paediatric and neonatal anaesthesia
- Paediatric cardiology
- Paediatric cardiothoracic and vascular surgery
- Paediatric critical care
- Paediatric hepatology
- Paediatric gastroenterology
- Paediatric nephrology
- Paediatric neurology
- Paediatric oncology
- Paediatric orthopaedics
- Paediatric surgery
- Paediatrics
- Pathology
- Pharmacology
- Physical medicine and rehabilitation
- Physiology
- Plastic and reconstructive surgery
- Psychiatry
- Pulmonary medicine
- Radiodiagnosis
- Radiotherapy
- Reproductive medicine and surgery
- Sports medicine
- Surgical gastroenterology
- Surgical oncology
- Thoracic surgery
- Traumatology and surgery
- Tropical medicine
- Urology
- Vascular surgery
- Virology

=== Sweden ===
In Sweden, a medical license is required before commencing specialty training. Those graduating from Swedish medical schools are first required to do a rotational internship of about 1.5 to 2 years in various specialties before attaining a medical license. The specialist training lasts 5 years.

=== United States ===
There are three agencies or organizations in the United States that collectively oversee physician board certification of MD and DO physicians in the United States in the 26 approved medical specialties recognized in the country. These organizations are the American Board of Medical Specialties (ABMS) and the American Medical Association (AMA); the American Osteopathic Association Bureau of Osteopathic Specialists (AOABOS) and the American Osteopathic Association; the American Board of Physician Specialties (ABPS) and the American Association of Physician Specialists (AAPS). Each of these agencies and their associated national medical organization functions as its various specialty academies, colleges and societies.

Certifying board	National organization	Physician type
ABMS	AMA	MD and DO
ABPS	AAPS	MD and DO
AOABOS	AOA	DO only

All boards of certification now require that medical practitioners demonstrate, by examination, continuing mastery of the core knowledge and skills for a chosen specialty. Recertification varies by particular specialty between every seven and every ten years.

In the United States there are hierarchies of medical specialties in the cities of a region. Small towns and cities have primary care, middle sized cities offer secondary care, and metropolitan cities have tertiary care. Income, size of population, population demographics, distance to the doctor, all influence the numbers and kinds of specialists and physicians located in a city.

== Demography ==
A population's income level determines whether sufficient physicians can practice in an area and whether public subsidy is needed to maintain the health of the population. Developing countries and poor areas usually have shortages of physicians and specialties, and those in practice usually locate in larger cities. For some underlying theory regarding physician location, see central place theory.

The proportion of men and women in different medical specialties varies greatly. Such sex segregation is largely due to differential application.

== Satisfaction and burnout ==
A survey of physicians in the United States came to the result that dermatologists are most satisfied with their choice of specialty followed by radiologists, oncologists, plastic surgeons, and gastroenterologists. In contrast, primary care physicians were the least satisfied, followed by nephrologists, obstetricians/gynecologists, and pulmonologists. Surveys have also revealed high levels of depression among medical students (25 - 30%) as well as among physicians in training (22 - 43%), which for many specialties, continue into regular practice. A UK survey conducted of cancer-related specialties in 1994 and 2002 found higher job satisfaction in the specialties with more patient contact. Rates of burnout also varied by specialty.

== See also ==
- Branches of medicine
- Interdisciplinary sub-specialties of medicine, including
  - Occupational medicine – branch of clinical medicine that provides health advice to organizations and individuals concerning work-related health and safety issues and standards. See occupational safety and health.
  - Disaster medicine – branch of medicine that provides healthcare services to disaster survivors; guides medically related disaster preparation, disaster planning, disaster response and disaster recovery throughout the disaster life cycle and serves as a liaison between and partner to the medical contingency planner, the emergency management professional, the incident command system, government and policy makers.
  - Preventive medicine – part of medicine engaged with preventing disease rather than curing it. It can be contrasted not only with curative medicine, but also with public health methods (which work at the level of population health rather than individual health).
  - Medical genetics – the application of genetics to medicine. Medical genetics is a broad and varied field. It encompasses many different individual fields, including clinical genetics, biochemical genetics, cytogenetics, molecular genetics, the genetics of common diseases (such as neural tube defects), and genetic counseling.
- Specialty Registrar
- Federation of National Specialty Societies of Canada
- Society of General Internal Medicine
