= American Academy of Disaster Medicine =

The American Academy of Disaster Medicine (AADM) was founded in 2006 to promote the science and art of disaster healthcare. It is one of the newest medical organizations in the world. On October 18, 2007, the American Academy of Disaster Medicine was also the first medical organization in history to fulfill a Presidential mandate (Homeland Security Presidential Directive 21) that called for the formal organization of disaster healthcare. AADM was instrumental in establishing disaster medicine as a recognized medical specialty; a certifying board, the American Board of Disaster Medicine was approved by the American Board of Physician Specialties in 2004. The academy's headquarters is in Tampa, Florida.

The AADM awards the degree of Fellow (FAADM) to recognize members who have distinguished themselves among their colleagues, as well as in their communities, by their service to disaster medicine. A fellow must meet a minimum accepted amount of continuing education and community service. Most AADM members are active in academic, leadership and clinical aspects of disaster healthcare.

The AADM's purpose is to educate physicians and healthcare professionals about disaster preparation in the medical community. The American Academy of Disaster Medicine (AADM) should not be confused with the American Academy of Emergency Medicine (AAEM), founded in 1993.
