= Post-hospitalist =

Post-Hospitalist Medicine is the discipline concerned with the medical care of patients residing in Post-Acute, Long-Term Care, Rehabilitation and Assisted Living Facilities. The Physicians whose primary professional focus is the post-hospital medical care of these patients are called Post-Hospitalists.

== Description ==
In recent years, acuity levels and medical needs of most patients entering Post-Acute and Long-Term Care facilities have dramatically increased. The American Hospital Association reports 54.3% of patients in post-acute facilities have Severity of Illness Level 3 and 4 in comparison to 40.8% of acute care hospital patients. "Patients in nursing facilities are frail, sick, elderly, have multiple comorbidities, and are oftentimes on many more medications than they need. It is only through frequent, publicized scheduled presence of specialized doctors in a facility that these issues can be addressed". Jerome Wilborn, M.D., National Medical Director of Post-Acute Care for IPC Healthcare.

The physicians who specialize in caring for patients in these types of facilities are Post-Hospitalists. "A specialist Post-Acute physician can provide better clinical care to a Post-Acute patient than a non-specialist. They know the rules, regulations and challenges that the patients, families and the skilled nursing facilities have. They're able to coordinate the patient care and the team's approach to care", Scott Kuhlman, former Vice President of Business and Staffing Development with Extended Care Physicians (ECP).

Typical community doctors who are a patient's Primary Care Provider (PCP), and most other Nurse Practitioner (NP) or Physician's Assistant (PA) extender models do not have the time or ability to effectively monitor patient care when the patient is in a post-acute or long-term care facility. As a result, increased hospitalizations, re-admissions and unnecessary ER utilization occur frequently, increasing overall health care costs.

When patients become ill with an urgent or non-emergency problem, most traditional care models typically direct the patient to the ER, utilizing the ER as an outpatient clinic rather than the clinician going to the facility, examining and treating the patient on-site.

"Post-Hospitalist Care is almost an art in itself", said Scott Sears, M.D. FACP, Chief Clinical Officer of Tacoma, Washington. based Sound Physicians. "That's why it's not in the patient's best interest to have a doctor who just dabbles in post-acute care. That's where the dedicated provider with a passion and vision for the work is so valuable. We also have more success with people who have more experience".

Health Systems and Managed Care Organizations are now utilizing Post-Hospitalist specialists in their continuum of care. "It's upping the game in Post-Acute care. It's looking at the whole continuum of care from a systems perspective, improving hand-offs and transitions" Scott Rissmiller, M.D., Chief Hospitalist at the Carolina Healthcare System.

Post-Hospitalist medical services focus on providing care to high-risk, medically complex patients with the following common diagnoses:

- Asthma
- Major Depressive Disorder
- Chronic Obstructive Pulmonary Disease (COPD)
- Osteoporosis
- Congestive Heart Failure (CHF)
- End Stage Renal Disease
- Dehydration
- Hepatitis C
- Pneumonia
- Hypertension
- Urinary Tract Infections (UTI)
- Rheumatoid Arthritis
- Diabetes Mellitus
- Pre and/or Postoperative Care
- Coronary Artery Disease
- Medication Reconciliation

In many instances, this population has multiple diagnoses, comorbidities and their medical needs are extensive. In the past, these patients would have stayed in the hospital much longer and at much higher overall health care costs.

Today, managing their care in less costly Post-Acute and Long-Term Care settings such as LTACs, Rehabilitation Centers, Skilled Nursing, Long-Term Care and Assisted Living Facilities is possible with the use of Post-Hospitalist Medical Services being provided on-site in these settings. Post-Hospitalists provide these specialized medical services exclusively in these various types of post-acute facilities.

== History ==
The term Post-Hospitalist was first attributed to Thomas Prose, MD, MPH, MBA, who coined the term in 2012. Prose founded General Medicine P.C.— The Post-Hospitalist Company, a health care practice devoted to the practice of Post-Hospitalist medicine in 1983. The practice of Post-Hospitalist medicine is still new in the United States and—while it has not yet reached widespread adoption— it is one of the faster growing of medical specialties.

== Training ==
As a relatively new specialty, only recently has certification for specialty experience and training for hospital medicine been offered. The American Board of Hospital Medicine (ABHM), a Member Board of the American Board of Physician Specialties (ABPS), was founded in 2009.

The ABHM was North America's first board of certification devoted exclusively to hospital medicine. In September 2009, the American Board of Internal Medicine (ABIM) created a program that provides general internists practicing in hospital settings the opportunity to maintain Internal Medicine Certification with a Focused Practice in Hospital Medicine (FPHM).

== See also ==
- Society of Hospital Medicine
- Hospitalist
