= Medical surge =

A medical surge occurs when "patient volumes challenge or exceed a hospital's servicing capacity"—often but not always tied to high volume of patients in a hospital's emergency room. Medical surges can occur after a mass casualty incident. In a poll by the American College of Emergency Physicians (ACEP) in May 2018, 93% of doctors said their US emergency rooms were not fully prepared for medical surges. 6% said their emergency departments were fully prepared.

== Hospital preparation ==
Hospitals preparation to manage an increase in patient volumes has been highlighted in recent times due to different man-made or natural-caused disasters. The Covid-19 pandemic is a recent well-known disaster situation and has made a big impact on the preparedness work. But hospital disaster preparation is at least described in the Second World War. Some hospitals, such as San Francisco General Hospital, have medical surge exercises to train staff.

=== Medical surge capacity ===
In February 2019, the American Hospital Association released a report that medical surge capacity was one of four major challenges threatening rural hospitals' ability to provide care, along with the "opioid epidemic," violence in the community, and cyber threats.

Surge capacity is described as "the ability to expand care capabilities in response to sudden or more prolonged demand." The requirements of surge may extend beyond direct patient care to include such tasks as extensive laboratory studies or epidemiological investigations. This is related to patients volume and identifying numbers of hospital beds, personnel, supplies, and equipment should be identified and addressed." These factors are often described as the 4S; Staff, Stuff, Structure and Systems.

=== Medical surge capability ===
According to the U.S. Department of Health & Human Services, medical surge capability required "special intervention to protect medical providers, other patients, and the integrity of the HCO. This is also the ability to manage patients requiring specialized medical care and evaluation." Notable examples include influxes of patients with SARS.
