= Utilitarian bioethics =

Branch of bioethics that incorporates principles of utilitarianism

Utilitarian bioethics refers to the branch of bioethics that incorporates principles of utilitarianism to directing practices and resources where they will have the most usefulness and highest likelihood to produce happiness, in regard to medicine, health, and medical or biological research.

Utilitarian bioethics deals with whether or not decisions of biology or medicine are good based on the Greatest Happiness principle, and thus any action or decision that leads to happiness for the greatest number of people is good. Many see problems with the morality of utilitarian bioethics, citing moral dilemmas in medical research and triage for example. Still, proponents for utilitarian bioethics look toward models like quality-adjusted life years (QALY) and medical policies like the Texas Advanced Directives Act (TADA) and euthanasia in the Netherlands as advancements in modern health care, while dissenting views argue of its devaluing of individual human life.

== History ==
Although utilitarian philosophy traces itself back to the nineteenth century British thinkers John Stuart Mill and Jeremy Bentham, the application of utilitarianism in contemporary bioethics originated in the work of Peter Singer in the 1970s and 1980s. A second generation of utilitarian bioethicists, including Julian Savulescu, Jacob M. Appel and Thaddeus Mason Pope, advanced utilitarian ethics further in the 1990s and 2000s. A few applications of the utilitarian bioethics in policy are the Groningen Protocol in the Netherlands and the Advance Directives Act in Texas.

In the 1990s, backlash against utilitarian bioethics emerged, led by such figures as Wesley J. Smith and novelist Dean Koontz. Philosopher Bernard Williams was also critical of the utilitarian perspective.

== Related areas ==
=== Morality ===
Those against utilitarian principles in research, health care, or bio-medical fields suggest that the means to achieve an overall benefit for society is not justified and becomes immoral, and anyone who is part of the act or who is involved in it being allowed is complicit in its immorality. They argue that utilitarianism fails to join itself with common morality, and thus the cannot be accepted as a moral, and any application of utilitarian principles are unethical.

Those in favor of utilitarian principles in research, health-care, or bio-medical fields seek advancements in these areas for the benefit of all people and the collective happiness as a species. They view, what those who are against utilitarian ethics would suggest as immoral acts, as good and necessary practices as a means to maximize total well-being, and the arguably controversial research and medical practices are good and beneficial to all people. Many who argue for the morality of utilitarian principles in research and medical areas point to our already accepted model of disaster triage, inherently utilitarian, which seeks to do the greatest amount of good for the greatest number of people by foregoing treatment of those in critical conditions for those who have a higher chance to recover and those that can be quickly cared for to then help in the care effort.

=== Resource distribution ===
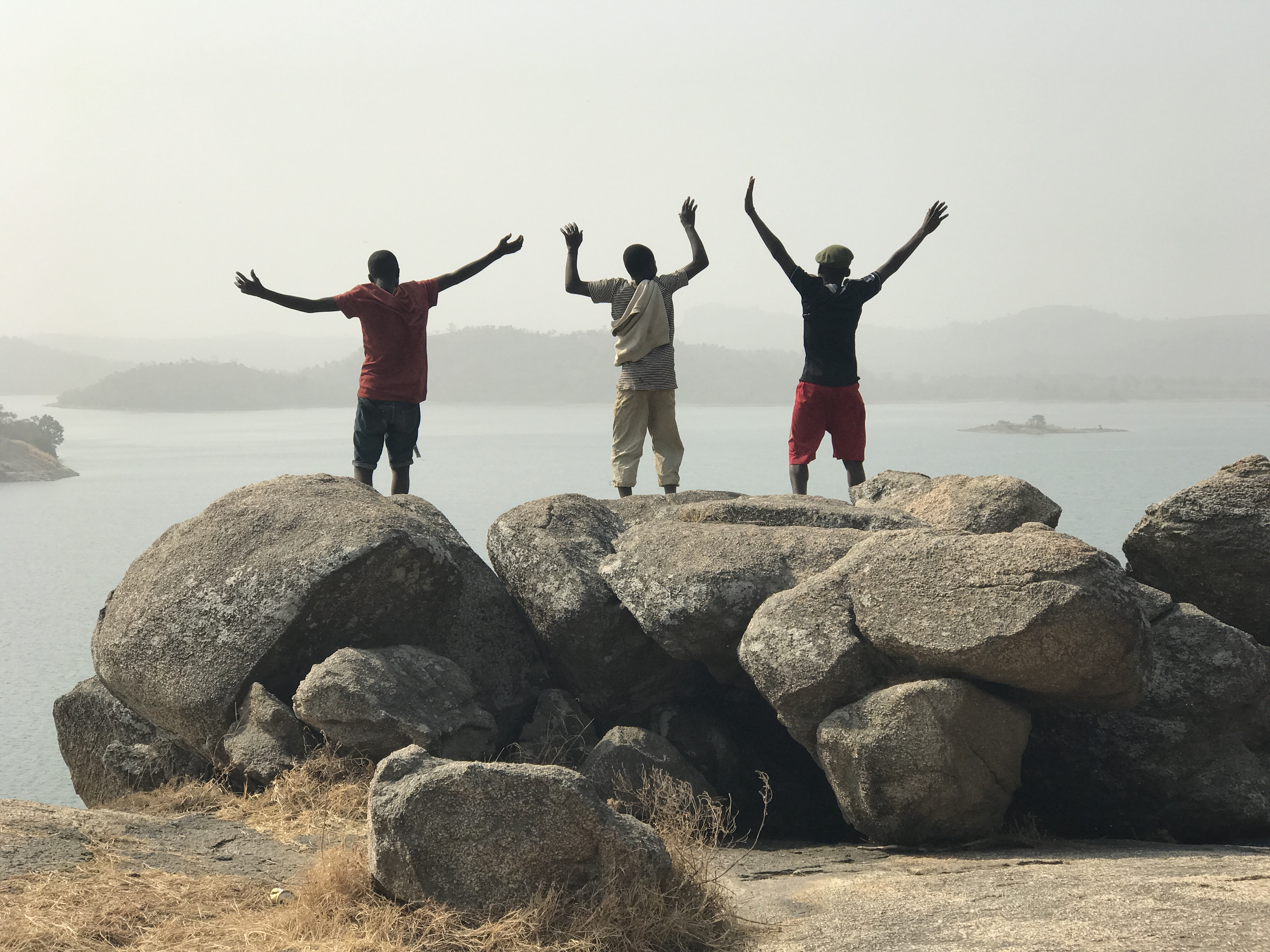
The image shows children having fun, relating to quality of life. QALY is a measurement of how many quality years of life someone is expected to experience due to a particular choice from a number of choices.

Utilitarian bioethics is based on the premise that the distribution of resources is a zero-sum game, and therefore medical decisions should logically be made on the basis of each person's total future productive value and happiness, their chance of survival from the present, and the resources required for treatment. One way to grasp an effective way to distribute resources is by cost-effective analysis. Utilitarian bioethicists argue that cost-effective analysis is the most effective tool in distributing and utilizing resources so to maximize the best possible outcome with the idea that the outcome would lead to a benefit or increased happiness for society. One example of cost-effective analysis in regard to health care is the concept of quality-adjusted life years or QALY. QALY is a measure of benefit from treating or allocating resources to individuals based on the comparison of each individuals alternative outcome. Although there is controversy in regard to the equality of persons in this concept, equality should be regarded as a separate issue, because if one uses a standard of measurement that produces the same amount of qalys for each individual, as proposed by G.W. Torrance one of the economist credited to the creation of the concept, then there is unfairness when we consider different age groups, with the elderly getting a lower amount of qalys.

Some this method of resource allocation as mechanical and devoid of human emotion, and argue for an augmented form of cost-effective analysis which seeks to correct this, called the Kevany Riposte. The Kevany Riposte is similar to the traditional cost-effective analysis method in that it compares alternative choices and their cost-effective ratio, but adds and additional element to the equation which is called the diplomatic value. This added element to resource allocation takes into account the future diplomatic and political effects of a decision, which shows how choices can have a future improvement and be more advantageous in the long run, though less cost-effective in the outset.

For many resource allocation decisions, those involving the most rare and severe cases, medical culture and society are at odds and the choice of where to distribute resources will inevitably cause some ethical offense.

=== Policy ===
Though not the principle moral framework for guiding laws, utilitarian ethics can be seen in a number of different areas of state and federal laws, especially those involving resource distribution and health policies.

==== TADA and Futile Care ====
In 1999, with the passing of the TADA, Texas became the first state to have a law on the books that deals directly with futile medical care. Section 166.046, Subsection (e) of the law states physicians have the right to refuse any intervention they deem as inappropriate. Utilitarian ethics would allow for such a decision given that if there is no benefit from the intervention, than resources as being used ineffectively and therefore effecting others in society, decreasing overall happiness. Some argue that the law is inherently flawed, in that what some physicians find futile-care, others might not agree. And even more, some argue that the very law itself demeans the value and dignity of human life. There have also been cases where the physicians who determined that treatment being done was futile-care were actually not so, which lead to possibly avoidable death. Given its criticisms, many applaud TADA for its groundbreaking development into medical policy and see it as a step forward to better health care.

==== The Groningen Protocol and Neonatal Euthanasia ====
Euthanasia in the Netherlands has been legal for sometime, albeit not for infants. However, neonatal euthanasia still occurs in the Netherlands with a general tolerance by society and no physicians or associated parties going to trial. The Groningen Protocol sought to provide an ethical framework to allow for euthanasia of infants with severe medical diagnosis and prognosis. Many believe that the protocol cannot be followed because the criteria of the protocol cannot be met by neonates, namely the quality-of-life and pain and suffering criteria. Those against the protocol believe in the value of principlism, that of beneficence and non-maleficence, and that the physician should care for the infant with the best of their ability. Proponents of the protocol argue that if there is unanimous agreement for the euthanizing of the neonate among those who are in the best position to make that decision, the parents and physicians, then euthanizing is in severe cases is a good and not immoral.

== See also ==
- Baby K
- Cost-utility analysis
- Ezekiel Emanuel
- Medical ethics
- Peter Singer
- Socialized medicine
