= Federation of National Specialty Societies of Canada =

The Federation of National Specialty Societies of Canada is an organization of national specialty societies in Canada created in 2004. It is based in Ottawa, Ontario.

It provides a forum for national specialty societies to discuss issues related to accessible medical specialty care in Canada. Morris Freedman, past president of the Canadian Neurological Society, is the current vice-president.

== See also ==
- Specialty Registrar
- American Board of Medical Specialties
