= American Board of Physician Specialties =

The American Board of Physician Specialties (ABPS), the official certifying body for the American Association of Physician Specialists (AAPS) is a non-profit umbrella organization for sixteen medical specialty boards that certifies and re-certifies physicians in fourteen medical specialties in the United States and Canada. It is one of three certifying bodies in the United States in addition to the American Board of Medical Specialties, and American Osteopathic Association Bureau of Osteopathic Specialists. The ABPS oversees Doctor of Medicine (M.D.) and Doctor of Osteopathic Medicine (D.O.) certification in the United States. The ABPS assists its Member Boards in developing and implementing educational and professional standards to evaluate and certify physician specialists. It is recognized by the U.S. Department of Labor as well as the Centers for Medicare and Medicaid Services (CMS).

== History ==
The American Association of Physician Specialists (AAPS) is the smallest of three multi-specialty physician/surgeon certifying entities in the United States, providing board certification to both M.D. and D.O. physicians. The AAPS has grouped its certification activities within a single subdivision called the American Board of Physician Specialties (ABPS). In August 2005, the ABPS name was registered to AAPS. The ABPS implements certification functions under the direction of AAPS.

AAPS (originally known as the American Association of Osteopathic Physicians) was founded in 1952 by Dr. E.O. Martin. Since 1984, AAPS has provided a headquarters for medical specialty boards of certification.

== Recognition by state medical boards ==
Today in the U.S. and its territories, there are seventy (70) state medical boards—some state medical boards are composed of an M.D. board and a D.O. board while others are combined as one, called a "composite board". Of the 70 state boards, the vast majority do not differentiate between any of the three nationally recognized multi-specialty boards of certification (ABMS, ABPS, AOABOS). In other words, the majority of the state medical boards are silent (or neutral) as to which board a given physician is certified by.

The remaining boards, approximately twenty (20), have established specific rules for physician advertising by which boards have to petition and receive permission for physicians to be able to advertise themselves as "board certified".

Those twenty (20) boards are:

- Arizona Medical Board
- Arizona Board of Osteopathic Examiners
- Medical Board of California Osteopathic
- Medical Board of California
- Florida Board of Medicine (ABPS is Recognized)
- Florida Board of Osteopathic Medicine (ABPS is Recognized)
- Louisiana State Board of Medical Examiners
- Missouri State Board of Registration for the Healing Arts
- New Jersey State Board of Medical Examiners
- New York State Board for Medicine (ABPS not recognized as equal to ABMS certification)
- North Carolina Medical Board
- Oklahoma State Board of Medical Licensure and Supervision (ABPS is Recognized)
- Oklahoma State Board of Osteopathic Examiners (ABPS is Recognized)
- Oregon Medical Board
- Pennsylvania State Board of Medicine
- Pennsylvania State Board of Osteopathic Medicine (ABPS is Recognized)
- South Carolina Board of Medical Examiners
- Texas Medical Board (ABPS is Recognized)
- Utah Department of Commerce (Physicians Licensing Board)
- Utah Department of Commerce (Board of Osteopathic Medicine) (ABPS is Recognized)

Physicians certified by ABPS and licensed by the Medical Board of California are prohibited from using the term "board certified" unless they are also certified by an American Board of Medical Specialties board.

It also appears that certification by an ABPS member board is not sufficient to allow use of the term "board certified" by physicians licensed in the State of New York. However, interpreting the law in New York is more complex.

== Specialties ==
The ABPS, the official certifying body of the American Association of Physician Specialists (AAPS), is the United States' third largest recognized physician multi-specialty certifying body, providing physician board certification re-certification for thousands of physicians in following 20 medical specialties:

- Administrative medicine
- Anesthesiology
- Dermatology
- Diagnostic radiology
- Disaster medicine – American Board of Disaster Medicine (ABODM)
- Emergency Medicine- Board of Certification in Emergency Medicine (BCEM)
- Family medicine obstetrics – Board of Certification in Family Medicine Obstetrics (BCFMO)
- Family practice
- Geriatric medicine
- Hospital medicine (new certification testing suspended)
- Integrative medicine
- Internal medicine
- Obstetrics and gynecology
- Ophthalmology
- Orthopedic surgery
- Plastic & reconstructive surgery
- Psychiatry
- Radiation oncology
- Surgery
- Urgent care

== See also ==
- American Board of Medical Specialties
- American Osteopathic Association Bureau of Osteopathic Specialists
- Board of Certification in Emergency Medicine
