= American Association of Physician Specialists =

- Formation: 1950
- Type: Professional association
- Tax ID no.: 23-7009389
- Legal status: 501(c)(6)
- Headquarters: Tampa, Florida
- Location: United States
- Members: Doctor of Medicine (MD); Doctor of Osteopathic Medicine (DO)
- Executive Director: Jeff Morris, JD
- Affiliations: American Association of Physician Specialists Foundation
- Website: www.aapsus.org

The American Association of Physician Specialists, Inc. (AAPS) is a 501(c)(6) not-for-profit organization founded in 1950, with headquarters in Tampa, Florida.

== Academies ==
The AAPS oversees the following 20 medical academies:

- Administrative medicine
- Anesthesiology
- Dermatology
- Diagnostic radiology
- Disaster medicine – American Academy of Disaster Medicine (AADM)
- Emergency medicine – American Academy of Emergency Physicians (AAEP)
- Family medicine obstetrics
- Family practice
- Geriatric medicine
- Hospital medicine
- Integrative medicine
- Internal medicine
- Obstetrics and gynecology
- Ophthalmology
- Orthopedic surgery
- Plastic & reconstructive surgery
- Psychiatry
- Radiation oncology
- Surgery
- Urgent care

== See also ==
- American Academy of Disaster Medicine
- American Board of Physician Specialties
- American Board of Medical Specialties
