= Canadian Osteopathic Association =

Canadian professional association

- Abbreviation: COA
- Formation: 1926
- Location: Canada
- Website: www.osteopathic.ca

The Canadian Osteopathic Association (COA) is a professional association of osteopathic physicians in Canada. The COA has partnered with Michigan State University College of Osteopathic Medicine to increase the number of osteopathic physicians practising in Canada.

Osteopathic Medicine and Osteopathy
Osteopathy in Australia and New Zealand
Osteopathic medicine in Canada
Osteopathy in Europe Osteopathy in the UK
Osteopathic medicine in the United States

== History ==
The COA was established in 1926. President for 2017–2019 is Dr. Jason Crookham, and Executive Director is Dr. James Church. In 2011, the COA launched the Canadian Osteopathic Medical Student Association and it is now led by Ravi Uppal, Corey Mayer and Khashayar Farzam. In 2012, the COA partnered with Michigan State University with the goal of increasing the number of osteopathic physicians in the country. The COA reported advocating for osteopathic physicians to be eligible for residency positions in Canada.

== Membership ==
Membership in the COA requires a Doctor of Osteopathic Medicine degree from a College of Osteopathic Medicine in the United States accredited by the American Osteopathic Association. As of 2019, there are no colleges of osteopathic medicine in Canada.
