= Regulation of alternative medicine =

Because of the uncertain nature of various alternative therapies and the wide variety of claims different practitioners make, alternative medicine has been a source of vigorous debate, even over the definition of "alternative medicine". Dietary supplements, their ingredients, safety, and claims, are a continual source of controversy. In some cases, political issues, mainstream medicine and alternative medicine all collide, such as in cases where synthetic drugs are legal but the herbal sources of the same active chemical are banned.

In other cases, controversy over mainstream medicine causes questions about the nature of a treatment, such as water fluoridation. Alternative medicine and mainstream medicine debates can also spill over into freedom of religion discussions, such as the right to decline lifesaving treatment for one's children because of religious beliefs. Government regulators continue to attempt to find a regulatory balance.

Jurisdiction differs concerning which branches of alternative medicine are legal, which are regulated, and which (if any) are provided by a government-controlled health service or reimbursed by a private health medical insurance company. The United Nations Committee on Economic, Social and Cultural Rights – article 34 (Specific legal obligations) of the General Comment No. 14 (2000) on The right to the highest attainable standard of health – states that

Furthermore, obligations to respect include a State's obligation to refrain from prohibiting or impeding traditional preventive care, healing practices and medicines, from marketing unsafe drugs and from applying coercive medical treatments, unless on an exceptional basis for the treatment of mental illness or the prevention and control of communicable diseases.

—

Specific implementations of this article are left to member states. Two governments, acting under the laws of their respective countries, maintain websites for public information making a distinction between "alternative medicine" and "complementary medicine". In North America, the National Institutes of Health (NIH) (a part of the U.S. Department of Health and Human Services) states:

"...people often use the words “alternative” and “complementary” interchangeably, but the two terms refer to different concepts: 'Complementary' generally refers to using a non-mainstream approach together with conventional medicine. 'Alternative' refers to using a non-mainstream approach in place of conventional medicine. True alternative medicine is not common. Most people use non-mainstream approaches along with conventional treatments. And the boundaries between complementary and conventional medicine overlap and change with time. For example, guided imagery and massage, both once considered complementary or alternative, are used regularly in some hospitals to help with pain management."

In the British Isles, the National Health Service (England)'s NHS Choices (owned by the Department of Health) states:

"Although 'complementary and alternative' is often used as a single category, it can be useful to make a distinction between complementary and alternative medicine. This distinction is about two different ways of using these treatments". "Treatments are sometimes used to provide an experience that is pleasant in itself. This can include use alongside conventional treatments, to help a patient cope with a health condition. When used this way the treatment is not intended as an alternative to conventional treatment. The US National Center for Complementary and Integrative Health (NCCIH) says that use of treatments in this way can be called 'complementary medicine'. Treatments are sometimes used instead of conventional medicine, with the intention of treating or curing a health condition. The NCCIH says that use of treatments in this way can be called 'alternative medicine'. There can be overlap between these two categories. For example, aromatherapy may sometimes be used as a complementary treatment, and in other circumstances is used as an alternative treatment. A number of complementary and alternative treatments are typically used with the intention of treating or curing a health condition. Examples include: homeopathy, acupuncture, osteopathy, chiropractic, herbalism."

== United States ==
In the United States the Food and Drug Administration's online warnings for consumers about medication health fraud includes a section on Alternative Medicine Fraud, such as a warning that Ayurvedic products generally have not been approved by FDA before marketing.

=== Texas ===
In the state of Texas, physicians may be partially protected from charges of unprofessional conduct or failure to practice medicine in an acceptable manner, and thus from disciplinary action, when they prescribe alternative medicine in a complementary manner, if board specific practice requirements are satisfied and the therapies utilized do not present "a safety risk for the patient that is unreasonably greater than the conventional treatment for the patient's medical condition."

=== Colorado ===
Practice of alternative medicine in Colorado is governed by the Colorado Natural Health Consumer Protection Act. The act prohibits techniques such as psychotherapy, surgery, midwifery, or dentistry but, after full disclosure, permits many alternative practices such as color or aromatherapy which are deemed harmless. The exact provisions of the law are complex.

== New Zealand ==
In New Zealand, alternative medicine products are classified as food products, so there are no regulations or safety standards in place.

== Australia ==
In Australia, the topic is termed as complementary medicine and the Therapeutic Goods Administration has issued various guidances and standards. Australian regulatory guidelines for complementary medicines (ARGCM) demands that the pesticides, fumigants, toxic metals, microbial toxins, radionuclides, and microbial contaminations present in herbal substances should be monitored, although the guidance does not request for the evidences of these traits. However, for the herbal substances in pharmacopoeial monographes, the detailed information should be supplied to relevant authorities

The production of modern pharmaceuticals is strictly regulated to ensure that medicines contain a standardized quantity of active ingredients and are free from contamination. Alternative medicine products are not subject to the same governmental quality control standards, and consistency between doses can vary. This leads to uncertainty in the chemical content and biological activity of individual doses. This lack of oversight means that alternative health products are vulnerable to adulteration and contamination. This problem is magnified by international commerce, since different countries have different types and degrees of regulation. This can make it difficult for consumers to properly evaluate the risks and qualities of given products.

== Denmark ==
In Denmark, herbal and dietary supplements is the designation of a range of products, which have in common their status as medicine belonging under the Danish Medicines Act. In the Danish Medicines Act there exist four types of herbal and dietary supplements: Herbal medicinal products, Strong vitamin and mineral preparations, Traditional botanical medicinal products and Homeopathic medicinal products. Some dietary supplements fall within a special category of products, which differ from the above in that they are not authorized medicinal products. Dietary supplements are regulated under the Food Act and are registered by the Danish Veterinary and Food Administration.

=== Alternative therapists ===
Denmark has a registration system for alternative therapy practitioners, RAB.

== Switzerland ==
The Swiss Federal Constitution prescribes that the Confederation and the Cantons shall, within the scope of their powers, ensure that consideration is given to complementary medicine.

== United Kingdom ==
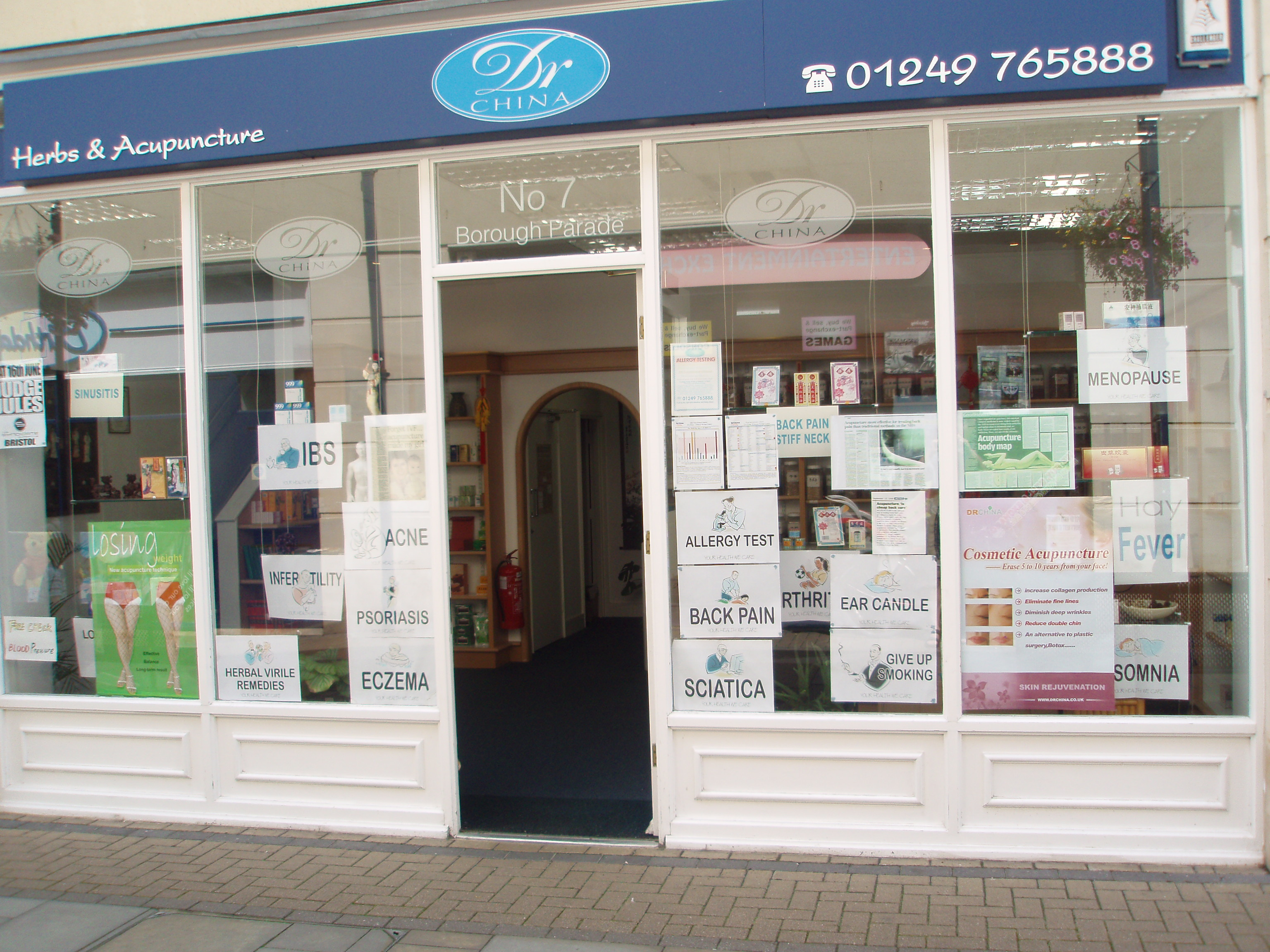
Herbs & Acupuncture

Safety, quality and efficacy are the only criteria on which United Kingdom legislation is founded to control human medicines. Regulation of medicines and medical devices, to ensure they work and are acceptably safe, is the responsibility of the Medicines and Healthcare products Regulatory Agency. The legal status of medicines is determined under the Medicines Act 1968 and European Council Directive 2001/83/EC which control the sale and supply of medicines. The legal status of medicinal products is part of the marketing authorisation which allows products to be available on a prescription (referred to as Prescription Only Medicines), or in a pharmacy without prescription under the supervision of a pharmacist, or on general sale and saleable in general retail outlets without the supervision of a pharmacist.

There are 12 organisations in the United Kingdom known as health and social care regulators. Each organisation oversees one or more of the health and social care professions by regulating individual professionals across the UK. The General Medical Council is one of these, for medical practitioners who as physicians are registered and licensed to practise under the Medical Act 1983. Councils for other practitioners include the General Chiropractic Council under the Chiropractors Act 1994 and the General Osteopathic Council under the Osteopaths Act 1993.

== See also ==
- Regulation and prevalence of homeopathy
