= The Do =

The Do could refer to:

- The Dø, a French / Finnish rock band
- The DO, a magazine of the Osteopathic profession in the United States
