= Terminology of alternative medicine =

Alternative medicine comprises medical practices which are untested, untestable, or known to be ineffective. Complementary medicine (CM), complementary and alternative medicine (CAM), integrated medicine or integrative medicine (IM), functional medicine, and holistic medicine are among many of its rebrandings.

== Terms for alternative medicine ==
The terms alternative medicine, complementary medicine, integrative medicine, holistic medicine, natural medicine, unorthodox medicine, fringe medicine, unconventional medicine, and new age medicine are used interchangeably as having the same meaning and are almost synonymous in most contexts.

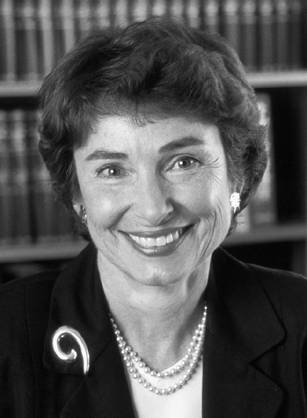
Marcia Angell: "There cannot be two kinds of medicine – conventional and alternative".

There is concern that a lack of stabilized terminology for these practices may give the appearance of effectiveness. Loose terminology may also be used to suggest that a dichotomy exists when it does not, e.g., the use of the expressions "Western medicine" and "Eastern medicine" to suggest that the difference is a cultural difference between the Asiatic east and the European west, rather than that the difference is between evidence-based medicine and other forms of treatment.

Some scholars adopt this "Western" and "Eastern" language. For example, in a study done on musculoskeletal pain acupuncture treatment, researchers use the term "Western Acupuncture", which is defined as the acupuncture practices that are evidence based. This term also removes the cultural connotations that are used in acupuncture such as "qi", or "primordial energy".

=== Complementary or integrative medicine ===
Complementary medicine (CM) or integrative medicine (IM) is when alternative medicine is used together with mainstream medical treatment, in a belief that it improves the effect of treatments. (Note: The Final Report (2002) of the White House Commission on Complementary and Alternative Medicine Policy states: "The Commissioners believe and have repeatedly stated in this Report that our response should be to hold all systems of health and healing, including conventional and CAM, to the same rigorous standards of good science and health services research. Although the Commissioners support the provision of the most accurate information about the state of the science of all CAM modalities, they believe that it is premature to advocate the wide implementation and reimbursement of CAM modalities that are yet unproven.") For example, acupuncture (piercing the body with needles to influence the flow of a supernatural energy) might be believed to increase the effectiveness or "complement" science-based medicine when used at the same time. Instead, significant drug interactions caused by alternative therapies may make treatments less effective, notably in cancer therapy. Integrative medicine has been described as an attempt to bring pseudoscience into academic science-based medicine. Due to its many names, the field has been criticized by writer Rose Shapiro for what she describes as intense rebranding of what are essentially the same practices.

CAM is an abbreviation of the phrase complementary and alternative medicine. The 2019 World Health Organization (WHO) Global Report on Traditional and Complementary Medicine states that the terms complementary and alternative medicine "refer to a broad set of health care practices that are not part of that country's own traditional or conventional medicine and are not fully integrated into the dominant health care system. They are used interchangeably with traditional medicine in some countries."

=== Other terms ===
Traditional medicine comprises medical aspects of traditional knowledge that developed over generations within the folk beliefs of various societies, including indigenous peoples, before the era of modern medicine. The 2019 WHO study defines traditional medicine as "the sum total of the knowledge, skill and practices based on the theories, beliefs and experiences indigenous to different cultures, whether explicable or not, used in the maintenance of health as well as in the prevention, diagnosis, improvement or treatment of physical and mental illness."

Holistic medicine is another rebranding of alternative medicine. In this case, the words balance and holism are often used alongside complementary or integrative, claiming to take into account a "whole" person, in contrast to the supposed reductionism of medicine. The "whole" person idea is referring to the 'analysis of physical, nutritional, environmental, emotional, spiritual and lifestyle elements' as defined by the American Holistic Health Association. When specific ailments are diagnosed, or health is being analyzed, things like mental health are factors that are also taken into consideration alongside physical health. According to a random national survey in America of US osteopathic physicians, less than a third of the respondents agreed with the fact that holism is a concept in osteopathic medicine that is distinct from allopathic medicine. This study highlights that osteopathic physicians view that practitioners in the allopathic field also practice holism in their respective practices.

Functional medicine is a marketing term for alternative medicine created by Jeffrey Bland, who founded The Institute for Functional Medicine (IFM).

== Definitions of alternative medicine ==
Alternative medicine is defined loosely as a set of products, practices, and theories that are believed or perceived by their users to have the healing effects of medicine, (Note: "[A]lternative medicine refers to all treatments that have not been proven effective using scientific methods.") (Note: "Complementary and alternative medicine (CAM) is a broad domain of resources that encompasses health systems, modalities, and practices and their accompanying theories and beliefs, other than those intrinsic to the dominant health system of a particular society or culture in a given historical period. CAM includes such resources perceived by their users as associated with positive health outcomes. Boundaries within CAM and between the CAM domain and the domain of the dominant system are not always sharp or fixed.") but whose effectiveness has not been established using scientific methods, (Note: "It is time for the scientific community to stop giving alternative medicine a free ride. There cannot be two kinds of medicine – conventional and alternative. There is only medicine that has been adequately tested and medicine that has not, medicine that works and medicine that may or may not work... speculation, and testimonials do not substitute for evidence.") or whose theory and practice is not part of biomedicine, (Note: "The phrase complementary and alternative medicine is used to describe a group of diverse medical and health care systems, practices, and products that have historic origins outside mainstream medicine. Most of these practices are used together with conventional therapies and therefore have been called complementary to distinguish them from alternative practices, those used as a substitute for standard care. ... Until a decade ago or so, "complementary and alternative medicine" could be defined as practices that are neither taught in medical schools nor reimbursed, but this definition is no longer workable, since medical students increasingly seek and receive some instruction about complementary health practices, and some practices are reimbursed by third-party payers. Another definition, practices that lack an evidence base, is also not useful, since there is a growing body of research on some of these modalities, and some aspects of standard care do not have a strong evidence base.") (Note: "An alternative medical system is a set of practices based on a philosophy different from Western biomedicine.") (Note: "CAM is a group of diverse medical and health care systems, practices, and products that are not generally considered part of conventional medicine.") or whose theories or practices are directly contradicted by scientific evidence or scientific principles used in biomedicine. "Biomedicine" or "medicine" is that part of medical science that applies principles of biology, physiology, molecular biology, biophysics, and other natural sciences to clinical practice, using scientific methods to establish the effectiveness of that practice. Unlike medicine, an alternative product or practice does not originate from using scientific methods, but may instead be based on hearsay, religion, tradition, superstition, belief in supernatural energies, pseudoscience, errors in reasoning, propaganda, fraud, or other unscientific sources.

=== Challenges in defining alternative medicine ===
Terminology has shifted over time, reflecting the preferred branding of practitioners. For example, the United States National Institutes of Health department studying alternative medicine, currently named the National Center for Complementary and Integrative Health (NCCIH), was established as the Office of Alternative Medicine (OAM) and was renamed the National Center for Complementary and Alternative Medicine (NCCAM) before obtaining its current name. Therapies are often framed as "natural" or "holistic", in apparent opposition to conventional medicine which is "artificial" and "narrow in scope", statements which are intentionally misleading.

Prominent members of the science and biomedical science community say that it is not meaningful to define an alternative medicine that is separate from a conventional medicine, because the expressions "conventional medicine", "alternative medicine", "complementary medicine", "integrative medicine", and "holistic medicine" do not refer to any medicine at all. Others say that alternative medicine cannot be precisely defined because of the diversity of theories and practices it includes, and because the boundaries between alternative and conventional medicine overlap, are porous, and change. The systems and practices it refers to are diffuse, and its boundaries poorly defined. Healthcare practices categorized as alternative may differ in their historical origin, theoretical basis, diagnostic technique, therapeutic practice and in their relationship to the medical mainstream. Some alternative therapies, such as traditional Chinese medicine (TCM) and Ayurveda, have antique origins in East or South Asia and are entirely alternative medical systems; others, such as homeopathy and chiropractic, have origins in Europe or the United States and emerged in the eighteenth and nineteenth centuries. Some, such as osteopathy and chiropractic, employ manipulative physical methods of treatment; others, such as meditation and prayer, are based on mind-body interventions. Under a definition of alternative medicine as "non-mainstream", treatments considered alternative in one location may be considered conventional in another.

Critics say the expression is deceptive because it implies there is an effective alternative to science-based medicine, and that complementary is deceptive because it implies that the treatment increases the effectiveness of (complements) science-based medicine, while alternative medicines that have been tested nearly always have no measurable positive effect compared to a placebo. It has been said that "there is really no such thing as alternative medicine, just medicine that works and medicine that doesn't", and that the very idea of "alternative" treatments is paradoxical because any treatment proven to work is by definition "medicine."

=== Different types of definitions ===
Some definitions seek to specify alternative medicine in terms of its social and political marginality to mainstream healthcare. This can refer to the lack of support that alternative therapies receive from medical scientists regarding access to research funding, sympathetic coverage in the medical press, or inclusion in the standard medical curriculum. In 1993, the British Medical Association (BMA) stated that it (Note: The BMA used the term non-conventional medicine instead of alternative medicine.) referred to "...those forms of treatment which are not widely used by the conventional healthcare professions, and the skills of which are not taught as part of the undergraduate curriculum of conventional medical and paramedical healthcare courses". In a US context, a definition coined in 1993 by the Harvard-based physician David M. Eisenberg described alternative medicine as "interventions neither taught widely in medical schools nor generally available in US hospitals". In a definition published in 2000 by the World Health Organization (WHO), CAM was defined as a broad set of health care practices that are not part of that country's own tradition and are not integrated into the dominant health care system. A widely used descriptive definition devised by the US NCCIH calls it "a group of diverse medical and health care systems, practices, and products that are not generally considered part of conventional medicine". However, these descriptive definitions are inadequate in the present-day when some conventional doctors offer alternative medical treatments and introductory courses or modules can be offered as part of standard undergraduate medical training; alternative medicine is taught in more than half of US medical schools and US health insurers are increasingly willing to provide reimbursement for alternative therapies. In 1999, 7.7% of US hospitals reported using some form of alternative therapy; this proportion had risen to 37.7% by 2008. A 15-year systematic review published in 2022 on the global acceptance and use of CAM among medical specialists found the overall acceptance of CAM at 52% and the overall use at 45%.

An expert panel at a conference hosted in 1995 by the US Office for Alternative Medicine (OAM), (Note: The Office for Alternative Medicine, part of the National Institutes of Health, was renamed NCCAM in 1998.) devised a theoretical definition of alternative medicine as "a broad domain of healing resources ... other than those intrinsic to the politically dominant health system of a particular society or culture in a given historical period". This definition has been widely adopted, and has been cited by the UK Department of Health, attributed as the definition used by the Cochrane Collaboration, and, with some modification, was preferred in the 2005 consensus report of the US Institute of Medicine. This definition, an expansion of Eisenberg's 1993 formulation, is silent regarding questions of the medical effectiveness of alternative therapies. Its proponents hold that it thus avoids relativism about differing forms of medical knowledge and, while it is an essentially political definition, this should not imply that the dominance of mainstream medicine is solely due to political forces. According to this definition, alternative and mainstream medicine can only be differentiated with reference to what is "intrinsic to the politically dominant health system of a particular society of culture". However, there is neither a reliable method to distinguish between cultures and subcultures, nor to attribute them as dominant or subordinate, nor any accepted criteria to determine the dominance of a cultural entity. If the culture of a politically dominant healthcare system is held to be equivalent to the perspectives of those charged with the medical management of leading healthcare institutions and programs, the definition fails to recognize the potential for division either within such an elite or between a healthcare elite and the wider population.

Evidence-based definitions distinguish alternative medicine based on its provision of therapies that are unproven, unvalidated, or ineffective and support of theories with no recognized scientific basis. These definitions characterize practices as constituting alternative medicine when, used independently or in place of evidence-based medicine, they are put forward as having the healing effects of medicine, but are not based on evidence gathered with the scientific method. Exemplifying this perspective, a 1998 editorial co-authored by Marcia Angell, a former editor of The New England Journal of Medicine, argued that:

It is time for the scientific community to stop giving alternative medicine a free ride. There cannot be two kinds of medicine – conventional and alternative. There is only medicine that has been adequately tested and medicine that has not, medicine that works and medicine that may or may not work. Once a treatment has been tested rigorously, it no longer matters whether it was considered alternative at the outset. If it is found to be reasonably safe and effective, it will be accepted. But assertions, speculation, and testimonials do not substitute for evidence. Alternative treatments should be subjected to scientific testing no less rigorous than that required for conventional treatments.

This line of division has been subject to criticism on the grounds that not all forms of standard medical practice have adequately demonstrated evidence of benefit, and that most conventional therapies, if proven to be ineffective, would not later be classified as alternative. Another definition is that alternative medicine refers to a diverse range of related and unrelated products, practices, and theories ranging from biologically plausible practices and products and practices with some evidence, to practices and theories that are directly contradicted by basic science or clear evidence, and products that have been conclusively proven to be ineffective or even toxic and harmful.

Proponents of an evidence-base for medicine (Note: "Evidence based medicine is the conscientious, explicit, and judicious use of current best evidence in making decisions about the care of individual patients"; "Evidence based medicine, whose philosophical origins extend back to mid-19th century Paris and earlier, remains a hot topic for clinicians, public health practitioners, purchasers, planners, and the public. British centres for evidence based practice have been established or planned in adult medicine, child health, surgery, pathology, pharmacotherapy, nursing, general practice, and dentistry; the Cochrane Collaboration and Britain's Centre for Review and Dissemination in York are providing systematic reviews of the effects of health care".) such as the Cochrane Collaboration take a position that all systematic reviews of treatments, whether "mainstream" or "alternative", ought to be held to the current standards of scientific method. In 2011, the Cochrane Collaboration proposed that indicators of a therapy's level of acceptance include government licensing of practitioners, coverage by health insurance, statements of approval by government agencies, and recommendation as part of a practice guideline; and that if something is currently a standard, accepted therapy, then it is not likely to be widely considered as alternative.

==== Australia ====
The public information website maintained by the National Health and Medical Research Council (NHMRC) of the Commonwealth of Australia uses the acronym "CAM" for a wide range of health care practices, therapies, procedures and devices not within the domain of conventional medicine. In the Australian context this is stated to include acupuncture; aromatherapy; chiropractic; homeopathy; massage; meditation and relaxation therapies; naturopathy; osteopathy; reflexology, traditional Chinese medicine; and the use of vitamin supplements.

==== Denmark ====
The Danish National Board of Health's Council for Alternative Medicine (Sundhedsstyrelsens Råd for Alternativ Behandling (SRAB)), an independent institution under the National Board of Health (Danish: Sundhedsstyrelsen), uses the term "alternative medicine" for:

- Treatments performed by therapists that are not authorized healthcare professionals.
- Treatments performed by authorized healthcare professionals, but those based on methods otherwise used mainly outside the healthcare system. People without a healthcare authorisation are [also] allowed to perform the treatments.

== Other terms ==
=== Allopathic medicine ===
Allopathic medicine or allopathy is a pejorative term used by proponents of alternative medicine to refer to modern scientific systems of medicine, such as the use of pharmacologically active agents or physical interventions to treat or suppress symptoms or pathophysiologic processes of diseases or conditions. The expression was coined in 1810 by the creator of homeopathy, Samuel Hahnemann (1755–1843). Among homeopaths and other alternative medicine advocates, the expression "allopathic medicine" is still used to refer to "the broad category of medical practice that is sometimes called Western medicine, biomedicine, evidence-based medicine, or modern medicine."

Use of the term remains common among homeopaths and has spread to other alternative medicine practices. The meaning implied by the label has never been accepted by conventional medicine and is still considered pejorative by some. William Jarvis, an expert on alternative medicine and public health, states that "although many modern therapies can be construed to conform to an allopathic rationale (e.g., using a laxative to relieve constipation), standard medicine has never paid allegiance to an allopathic principle" and that the label "allopath" was "considered highly derisive by regular medicine."

Many modern science-based medical treatments (antibiotics, vaccines, and chemotherapeutics, for example) do not fit Samuel Hahnemann's definition of allopathy, as they seek to prevent illness, or remove the cause of an illness by acting on the cause of disease.

== See also ==
- List of forms of alternative medicine
- Therapeutic nihilism

== Bibliography ==
- "Latest Survey Shows More Hospitals Offering Complementary and Alternative Medicine Services" (Press release). American Hospital Association. 2008-09-15. Archived from the original on 2012-09-02.
- Board of Science and Education, British Medical Association (1993). Complementary Medicine: New Approaches to Good Practice. Oxford University Press. ISBN 978-0-19-286166-5.
- Committee on the Use of Complementary and Alternative Medicine by the American Public for the Board on Health Promotion and Disease Prevention, Institute of Medicine (2005). Complementary and Alternative Medicine in the United States. Washington, D.C.: National Academy Press. ISBN 978-0-309-09270-8.
- Dawkins, R. (2003). Menon, L. (ed.). A Devil's Chaplain: Selected Essays. London: Weidenfeld & Nicolson. ISBN 978-0-7538-1750-6.
- Eisenberg DM, Kessler RC, Foster C, Norlock FE, Calkins DR, Delbanco TL (January 1993). "Unconventional medicine in the United States. Prevalence, costs, and patterns of use". The New England Journal of Medicine. 328 (4): 246–52. doi:10.1056/NEJM199301283280406. PMID 8418405.
- Eisenberg DM, Davis RB, Ettner SL, Appel S, Wilkey S, Van Rompay M, Kessler RC (November 1998). "Trends in alternative medicine use in the United States, 1990-1997: results of a follow-up national survey". JAMA. 280 (18): 1569–75. doi:10.1001/jama.280.18.1569. PMID 9820257.
- Gevitz N (1997) [1993]. "Chapter 28: Unorthodox Medical Theories". In Bynum WG, Porter RS (eds.). Companion Encyclopedia of the History of Medicine. Vol. 1. New York & London: Routledge. ISBN 978-0-415-16419-1.
- Kasper DL, Fauci AS, Hauser SL, Longo DL, Jameson JL, Loscalzo J (2015). Harrison's Principles of Internal Medicine (19th ed.). New York: McGraw Hill Education. ISBN 978-0-07-180215-4.
- Sagan, C. (1996). The Demon-Haunted World: Science As a Candle in the Dark. New York: Random House. ISBN 978-0-394-53512-8.
- Walton J. (2000) [Session 1999–2000, HL 123]. Sixth Report: Complementary and Alternative Medicine. London: The Stationery Office. ISBN 978-0-10-483100-7.
- General Guidelines for Methodologies on Research and Evaluation of Traditional Medicine (PDF). Vol. WHO/EDM/TRM/2001.1. Geneva: World Health Organization (WHO). 2000. Archived (PDF) from the original on 2022-10-09. "This document is not a formal publication of the WHO. The views expressed in documents by named authors are solely the responsibility of those authors."
