= Lymphatic pump =

The lymphatic pump is a method of manipulation used by physicians who practice manual medicine (primarily osteopathic physicians).

Manual lymphatic drainage techniques remain a clinical art founded upon hypotheses, theory, and preliminary evidence.

== History ==
The term lymphatic pump was invented by Earl Miller, D.O. to describe what was formerly known in osteopathic medicine as the thoracic pump technique.

== Technique ==
The technique is applied to a person lying down by holding their ankle and applying gentle pressure repeatedly using the leg as a "lever" to rock the pelvis.

== Relative contraindications ==
While no firmly established absolute contraindications exist for lymphatic techniques, the following cases are examples of relative contraindications: bone fractures, bacterial infections with fever, abscesses, and cancer.
