= Gevitz =

Gevitz is a surname. Notable people with the surname include:

- Luna Gevitz (born 1994), Danish footballer
- Norman Gevitz, American medical historian
