= DOCARE =

Coordinates: 41.8942°N 87.6190°W

DOCARE International
- Formation: 1961
- Purpose: Medical
- Location: Chicago, IL
- Region served: Western Hemisphere, South America
- President: Allison L. Abraham, DO
- Vice President: Shane Sergent, DO
- Parent organization: American Osteopathic Association
- Website: docareintl.org

DOCARE International is a non-profit medical outreach program that brings health care to underserved communities in remote areas of the Western Hemisphere. DOCARE International provides health care services through permanent medical clinics and short-term outreach trips. DOCARE International has worked in countries such as Haiti, Guatemala, Nicaragua, Haiti, Peru, India, Malawi, Uganda, and Tanzania. DOCARE International operates three permanent clinics, two Guatemala (San Andrés Itzapa and Tecpán Guatemala) and one in Chacraseca, Nicaragua.

== History ==
DOCARE was founded by Ernest A. Allaby, D.O. in 1961. DOCARE is operated by the American Osteopathic Association, and consists of osteopathic physicians (DO), osteopathic medical students, M.D. physicians, and other healthcare professionals.

DOCARE has partnered with the US Navy on medical missions.
