= Osteopathic Physicians & Surgeons v. California Medical Ass'n =

1964 US legal case

Osteopathic Physicians & Surgeons v. California Medical Association, 224 Cal. App. 2d 378 (Cal. App. 2d Dist. 1964) was a legal case between two medical associations in the state of California. The case was under review in California state courts from 1962-1964. After numerous appeals, the California Supreme Court ruling found the California Medical Association's refusal to grant osteopathic physicians licensure to practice medicine in the state of California to be unconstitutional.

== Background ==
By the 1950s, osteopathic physicians (D.O.) were numerous in California compared to their Doctor of Medicine (M.D.) counterparts, since the University of California, Irvine School of Medicine was an osteopathic medical school. Nevertheless, osteopathic physicians began to feel victimized by the national image of osteopathic medicine, particularly by those MDs who viewed colleges of osteopathic medicine as teaching "cultist healing."

Leaders of the California Medical Association (CMA) and the California Osteopathic Association (COA) met secretly behind closed doors in the late 1950s to discuss a potential merger between the two medical groups. By May 1961, a contract between CMA and COA was ready to be voted on by their respective House of Delegates. As part of the merger, which was approved in 1962, all graduates from the College of Osteopathic Physicians and Surgeons (COP&S) as well as DOs who held a valid license in the state would be awarded a Doctor of Medicine degree. Further, those DOs who accepted the MD degree could no longer identify themselves as osteopathic physicians.

As part of the merger agreement, COP&S was renamed the California College of Medicine and accredited as an MD degree-granting institution. Additionally, an initiative, proposition 22, was placed on the state ballot during the November 1962 elections that would limit the osteopathic state licensing board from administering new licensing. It could still renew licenses of DOs until the number of practicing DOs diminished to less than 40, at which time it would be dissolved and the remaining DOs transferred to the jurisdiction of the state medical licensing board.

Meanwhile, the California College of Medicine was adopted by the University of California Regents in 1964 and placed on their Irvine campus in 1968. Ex-DO faculty that received the MD degree in 1962 taught alongside congenital MD faculty for several decades henceforth. In 2007 the college's name was again changed to the University of California Irvine, School of Medicine.

The California Medical Association (CMA) issued MD degrees to all DOs in the state of California for a nominal fee. "By attending a short seminar and paying $65, a doctor of osteopathy (now Doctor of Osteopathic Medicine) (DO) could obtain an MD degree; 86 percent of the DOs in the state (out of a total of about 2000) chose to do so." It also placed a ban on issuing physician licenses to DOs moving to California from other states. However, the decision proved to be controversial.

In 1974, after protest and lobbying by influential and prominent DOs, the California Supreme Court ruled in Osteopathic Physicians and Surgeons of California v. California Medical Association, that licensing of DOs in that state must be resumed.

Today, the Medical Board of California, which licenses M.D.s and International Medical School Graduates (M.B.B.S. / M.D.), and the Osteopathic Medical Board of California, which licenses D.O.s whose degree was obtained from an American Osteopathic Association (AOA) approved Medical School, operate as separate Medical Licensing Institutions.
