= Student Osteopathic Medical Association =

- Abbreviation: SOMA
- Type: Professional association
- Headquarters: Chicago, IL
- Location: United States
- Official language: English
- National President: Cassie Holub
- National Vice President/Speaker of the House: Kailey Jacobson
- Website: studentdo.org

The Student Osteopathic Medical Association (SOMA) is a national, not-for-profit osteopathic medical organization founded to ensure a high quality of education for osteopathic medical students, to promote unity within the osteopathic medical profession, and to improve the delivery of healthcare by Doctors of Osteopathic Medicine (D.O.) SOMA is the student affiliate organization of the American Osteopathic Association and works with all chapters to foster communication between government at the local and national levels and the osteopathic medical profession.

The organization also awards scholarships annually to osteopathic medical students who demonstrate leadership, compassion, or exceptional dedication to addressing the medically underserved, political activism, international medicine, or public health. Pre-SOMA is a branch of the organization dedicated to the education of undergraduate pre-medical students about the osteopathic medical profession to aid them in the medical school selection process.
