= Bryan E. Bledsoe =

Emergency medicine physician and educator

- Education: BS, University of Texas at Arlington; DO, Texas College of Osteopathic Medicine
- Occupations: Osteopathic physician (DO), Emergency physician

Bryan E. Bledsoe (born 1955), is an emergency medicine physician, paramedic, author and educator. Bledsoe is Clinical Professor of Emergency Medicine in the Department of Emergency Medicine at the Kirk Korkorian School of Medicine at UNLV in Las Vegas.

Bledsoe is the author of a textbook for paramedic education. He has also published many articles in peer-reviewed medical journals and magazines.

Bledsoe resides in Texas and Nevada. He has expressed the view that "the safest place in America to suffer sudden cardiac arrest is a casino," since Las Vegas establishments used to over-excited tourists suffering ill-effects – are well supplied with defibrillators and have watchful staff who can react quickly to incidents.

Bledsoe has been critical of the osteopathic manipulative medicine training given to D.O. physicians. In a 2004 letter to The Journal of the American Osteopathic Association he asked: "How can the osteopathic medical profession deliberately seek the brightest college graduates to become osteopathic physicians and at the same time, ask those students to believe in and practice modes of therapy that have little or no proved effect?"

== Education ==
Bryan E. Bledsoe graduated from the University of Texas at Arlington with a Bachelor of Science degree (BS). He later graduated from medical school at the University of North Texas with a Doctor of Osteopathic Medicine degree (DO). He completed his residency in emergency medicine at Texas Tech University.
