= Dietmar Daichendt =

German physician and university teacher

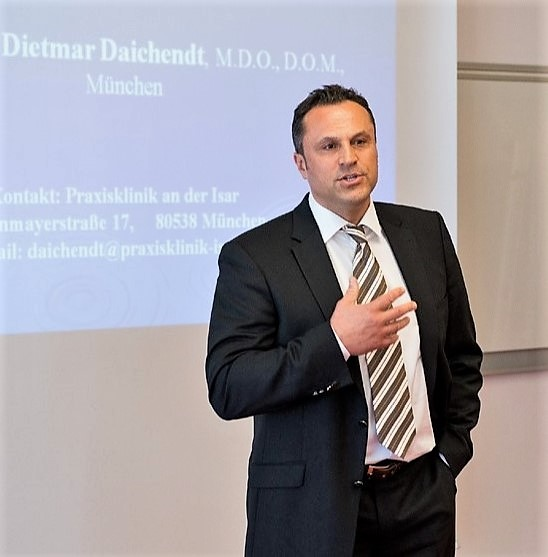
Dietmar Daichendt

Dietmar Jürgen Daichendt (born 1967 in Sibiu, Romania) is a German professor of medicine in the field of Osteopathy, Chiropractic and Manual medicine. He is a practising medical doctor in Munich and lectures at the universities Deutsche Hochschule für Gesundheit und Sport and the Steinbeis-Hochschule Berlin. He also has a teaching assignment for LMU Munich or the Deutsche Gesellschaft für Chirotherapie und Osteopathie.

Daichendt was appointed to the first professorship for Manual medicine (chiropractic and osteopathic) in Germany in 2011 as well as to the first professorship for Osteopathic and Manual medicine in Germany in 2015.

He is president of the scientific medical institute German Society for Chirotherapy and Osteopathy (German: Deutsche Gesellschaft für Chirotherapie und Osteopathie).

He is known for articles and interviews in media.
