= In-Training =

in-Training
- Type: Peer-reviewed medical student publication
- Format: online
- Owner: Pager Publications, Inc.
- Founder(s): Ajay Major and Aleena Paul
- Publisher: Pager Publications, Inc.
- Editor-in-chief: Jennifer Geller and Eshiemomoh Osilama
- Managing editor: Grishma Reddy and Alison White
- Founded: April 2012
- Website: in-training.org

in-Training is an online peer-reviewed publication for medical students.

It was founded on April 5, 2012 by Ajay Major and Aleena Paul, two medical students at Albany Medical College, as the first online publication in the United States that is written, edited, and produced entirely by medical students.

in-Training publishes a wide array of written content generated by medical students, as well as artistic works. Content is published continuously throughout the year in a blog format on the magazine’s website.

in-Training published a print book entitled in-Training: Stories from Tomorrow's Physicians on April 29, 2016. The book is a compendium of 102 articles originally published on in-Training accompanied by discussion questions.

in-Training published its 1000th article on September 18, 2016, representing 450 medical student authors at 152 medical schools in 19 countries.

== History ==
The inception of in-Training began in April 2012 with a niche analysis of medical student publishing, which revealed an absence of peer-managed publications that were dedicated to the medical student community. Following the development of an editorial structure and peer-editing workflow, publication bylaws, ethical guidelines, and consultation with legal experts, the publication went live at on July 2, 2012.

In an interview with the Scientific American Incubator, founders Ajay Major and Aleena Paul explained their vision in founding in-Training:

"With in-Training, we recognized the need for a proper forum for medical students to showcase their literary and artistic endeavors. in-Training seeks to meet a dire need for a communal gathering place for medical students. We are the agora of the medical student community, and as such, we strive to publish innovative thought in the arts, politics, science, and literature. We provide a virtual forum for medical students to participate in the shared experience of being a physician-in-training and to learn from the reflections and wisdom of their peers."

The publication was specifically founded as a peer-edited and peer-managed publication "by medical students and for medical students" in order to "provide medical students with a place to express themselves in a way that was unfiltered and uncensored." In addition, the publication was founded upon several core principals, including no anonymous authors with all authors identified, an open-access publication without subscriptions, no advertisements, and no copyrighting of articles, with all copyrights retained by authors.

One year after its founding in the summer of 2013, editors-in-chief Ajay Major and Aleena Paul retooled the publication as a magazine focused on publishing narratives and reflection articles, and also released a new mission statement for the publication that focused on in-Training as a virtual platform that facilitated self-reflection, community and collaboration among medical students on the global stage.

Editor-in-chief and founder Ajay Major explained the rationale for this change in the in-Training mission in an interview:

"...when we went live, we got a huge onslaught of articles in the realm of humanism in medicine: talking about the first day in gross dissection, the first patient dying, or the stresses of having a family in medical school. We found that we had built a publication that reached out to this medical student audience that so desperately wanted to write."

It was at that time that in-Training gained its identity as an "organic" publication that would evolve over time to meeting the changing needs of the medical student community.

With the publication of "A Lack of Care: Why Medical Students Should Focus on Ferguson" by a medical student at Alpert Medical School in December 2014, which was featured in a Stanford Medicine X talk in 2015 about the article's role in unifying the White Coats 4 Black Lives movement, in-Training began to evolve as a publication. Throughout 2015 to 2016, editors-in-chief Joseph Ladowski and Vikas Bhatt focused increasingly on publishing articles on social justice, politics, and health policy, including a series of articles on the Flint water crisis and controversy surrounding the USMLE Step 2 Clinical Skills exam.

In January 2015, in-Training launched a year-long intensive writing internship for medical students with one-on-one mentorship from the medical student editors. The internship has enrolled cohorts for 2015, 2016 and 2017.

== Content ==
The magazine identifies itself as an “organic" publication that changes over time to meet the needs of the medical student community. (sci am, wing of zock) As stated by the founders Ajay Major and Aleena Paul in their Scientific American Incubator interview:

At its inception, we embraced that in-Training would be an organic publication that advanced with the changing perspectives and passions of the medical student community. We imagine that the body of knowledge hosted on in-Training represents a sort of ‘institutional memory’ of the medical student community, a notion that requires us to be malleable and acutely aware of the shifting needs of medical students.

in-Training has published 40 columns written by medical students. in-Training has produced three podcast series which are syndicated on iTunes and is a founding member of The Vocalis Podcast Network, a network of podcasts for medical students. in-Training articles are also syndicated on Student Doctor Network.

in-Training publishes an annual Mental Health Week issue, which first began in June 2015 and continued in 2016 and 2017.

== Editorial Board and Workflow ==
in-Training is edited and managed entirely by an independent editorial board of over 40 volunteer, unpaid medical students. The publication is led by two editors-in-chief, who approve all content prior to publication. All articles published on in-Training undergo peer-review by at least two medical student editors prior to publication.

The former and present editors-in-chief of in-Training are as follows: founders Ajay Major and Aleena Paul from Albany Medical College (2012-2016); Vikas Bhatt from Drexel University College of Medicine and Joseph Ladowski from Indiana University School of Medicine (2015-2017); and Andrew Kadlec at Medical College of Wisconsin and Ria Pal from University of Rochester Medical Center (2016–present).

== in-Training: Stories from Tomorrow's Physicians ==
On April 29, 2016, in-Training published a book entitled in-Training: Stories from Tomorrow's Physicians, a print collection of 102 manuscripts originally published on in-Training since 2012.

The book was marketed as “a compendium of peer-edited narratives written by medical students on humanism, our real-life patients, and the challenges of being a physician-in-training.”

The book was designed as a resource guide for medical students and educators interested in the medical humanities, with each manuscript being accompanied by discussion questions written by the medical student editors of in-Training. The collection was curated and edited by Ajay Major and Aleena Paul, the founders of in-Training.

The book has been reviewed by The British Medical Journal, The Journal of the American Osteopathic Association, Durham University Centre for Medical Humanities, Student Doctor Network, and Clinical Correlations: The NYU Langone Online Journal of Medicine.

The publisher of the book is Pager Publications, Inc., a 501c3 nonprofit literary corporation founded in 2015 by Ajay Major and Aleena Paul.

== Awards ==
in-Training is a winner of the Summer/Fall 2014 and Fall 2015 Digital Health Awards, a competition that recognizes high-quality digital health resources for consumers and health professionals.

Founder and editor-in-chief Ajay Major was the winner of the MedTech Boston "40 Under 40 Healthcare Innovators of 2015" for his work with in-Training.

== Funding ==
in-Training is currently funded by Pager Publications, Inc., a 501c3 nonprofit literary corporation that curates and supports peer-edited publications for the medical education community. Website hosting costs for the 2014, 2015 and 2016 calendar years were funded by a gift from the Albany Medical College Alumni Association.
