= In-Training: Stories from Tomorrow's Physicians =

in-Training: Stories from Tomorrow's Physicians
- Peer-edited narratives written by medical students on humanism, our real-life patients, and the challenges of being a physician-in-training
- Editors: Ajay Major and Aleena Paul
- Cover artist: Ajay Major
- Language: English
- Genre: medical humanities and narrative medicine
- Publisher: Pager Publications, Inc.
- Publication date: April 29, 2016
- Publication place: United States of America
- Pages: 372
- ISBN: 978-0-692-65863-5
- Website: in-Training: Stories from Tomorrow's Physicians

in-Training: Stories from Tomorrow’s Physicians is a print collection of 102 manuscripts originally published on in-Training, the online magazine for medical students, since its founding in July 2012. The collection was written, curated, and edited entirely by medical students.

The book is “a compendium of peer-edited narratives written by medical students on humanism, our real-life patients, and the challenges of being a physician-in-training.”

The book was published by Pager Publications, Inc., a 501c3 nonprofit literary corporation founded by Ajay Major and Aleena Paul, the founders of in-Training.

== Authors ==
The 80 authors of the manuscripts in the collection are medical students across the United States and Canada, all of whom were writers for in-Training. The book was curated and edited by Ajay Major and Aleena Paul, the founders of in-Training.

== Contents ==
The 102 manuscripts in the collection were selected from over 800 articles originally published on in-Training since its founding in July 2012. Each manuscript is accompanied by reflective discussion questions written by the medical student editors of in-Training.

The book was designed as a resource guide for medical students and educators interested in the medical humanities, so the collection includes first-person accounts of experiences in dissection lab, in the classroom, and on the wards, reflecting on the patient-physician relationship, burnout, systemic barriers to care, and discovering passion for the healing arts.

The manuscripts are arranged into the following sections: Dissection Lab, Learning Curve (preclinical reflections), Work-Life Balance, From the Other Side (medical students or their families as patients), Systemic Afflictions (social justice and public health), Our Patients (patient narratives), Communication and Miscommunication, Burnout, Death and Dying, Global Health, Feeling Like a Physician (transitioning from medical school to residency).

== Critical reception ==
The book has been reviewed by The British Medical Journal, The Journal of the American Osteopathic Association, Durham University Centre for Medical Humanities, Student Doctor Network, and Clinical Correlations: The NYU Langone Online Journal of Medicine.
