= Osteopathic medicine in Canada =

This article discusses osteopathic physicians practising medicine in Canada, for non-physician osteopathic practitioners, see Osteopathy in Canada.

Osteopathic Medicine and Osteopathy
Osteopathy in Australia and New Zealand
Osteopathic medicine in Canada
Osteopathy in Europe Osteopathy in the UK
Osteopathic medicine in the United States

Osteopathic medicine in Canada is similar to conventional medicine in Canada, with the addition of osteopathic manipulation to diagnose and treat patients. Osteopathic physicians hold equal practice rights to non-osteopathic physicians (MDs) in Canada. North American osteopathic medicine requires an osteopathic physician to be trained and receive the Doctor of Osteopathic Medicine degree granted by a College of Osteopathic Medicine accredited by the American Osteopathic Association.

The Canadian Osteopathic Association (COA) represents osteopathic physicians registered for medical practice across Canada, and the Canadian Osteopathic Medical Student Association (COMSA) is the affiliated student organization. In Canada, the titles "osteopath" and "osteopathic physician" are protected in some provinces by the medical regulatory college for physicians and surgeons. As of 2011, there were approximately 20 U.S.-trained osteopathic physicians, all of whom held a Doctor of Osteopathic Medicine degree, practising in all of Canada. As of 2014, no training programs have been established for osteopathic physicians in Canada. Currently, there are no DO programs outside the United States. DO programs are accredited by the Commission on Osteopathic College Accreditation (COCA) of the American Osteopathic Association. The authority for licensure of osteopathic physicians lies with the provincial Colleges of Physicians and Surgeons.

== Licensing requirements for osteopathic physicians ==
This is a summary of the licensing requirements of osteopathic physicians in Canada:

Province / Territory	Scope of practise	Requirements for Licensure
Alberta	Unlimited.	LMCC, COMLEX, USMLE, accepted for licensure.
British Columbia	Unlimited.	LMCC, COMLEX, USMLE, FLEX, NBME accepted for licensure.
Manitoba	Unlimited.	US License recognized
New Brunswick	Unlimited.	LMCC, COMLEX, accepted for licensure. DOs registered in Maine accepted for licensure.
Newfoundland and Labrador	Unlimited.	US License recognized
Northwest Territories	Unlimited.	US License recognized
Nova Scotia	Unlimited.	LMCC and COMLEX accepted for licensure.
Ontario	Unlimited.	LMCC, COMLEX, and USMLE accepted for licensure.
Prince Edward Island	Unlimited.	
Quebec	Unlimited.	1 year GME in Quebec & French fluency required. LMCC and COMLEX accepted for licensure
Saskatchewan	Unlimited.	
Yukon	Unlimited.	US License recognized

The Canadian Osteopathic Association started the Canadian Osteopathic Medical Student Association in 2011.

== See also ==
- Canadian Osteopathic Association
- Doctor of Osteopathic Medicine
- Osteopathic medicine in the United States
- Osteopathy in Canada
