= Canadian Osteopathic Medical Student Association =

Canadian Osteopathic Medical Student Association (COMSA)
- Abbreviation: COMSA
- Formation: 2011
- Location: Canada
- Website: www.studentdo.ca

The Canadian Osteopathic Medical Student Association (COMSA) is a student body that works to promote awareness of Osteopathic Medicine in Canada both among the general population and the future physicians of Canada. They are affiliated with the Canadian Osteopathic Association.

== History ==
Founded in 2011, COMSA has worked to increase awareness of the Doctor of Osteopathic Medicine degree throughout Canada. The organization has helped hundreds of students through the process of becoming an osteopathic physician and has drastically grown in size every single year. Since 2012, COMSA started to host webinars and seminars at various universities across Canada to increase awareness of the DO medical degree. Additionally, Michigan State University College of Osteopathic Medicine (MSU-COM) launched a Canadian initiative to recruit 20-25 Canadian applicants each year to help spread awareness of the DO degree, leading to more than doubling of Canadian applicants and matriculates to Osteopathic medical schools (AACOM data). In 2015, under the leadership of Sevan Evren and Pranay Chander, COMSA conducted a study to determine the priorities and challenges faced by Canadian DO students and ways in which the profession can be expanded in Canada. Over the years COMSA has lobbied the American Osteopathic Association (AOA), American Association of Colleges of Osteopathic Medicine (AACOM) and Health Canada to support the interests of osteopathic physicians in Canada. Within recent years, COMSA has established pre-osteopathic medicine societies in Canada at The University of Guelph and Western University. COMSA also continues to lobby provincial regulatory bodies for unrestricted licensure and title protection of physicians with a Doctor of Osteopathic Medicine degree from the US.

== Mission ==
The Canadian Osteopathic Medical Student Association (COMSA) is dedicated to growing and spreading awareness of Osteopathic Medicine throughout Canada. Goals of the organization range from health care policy advocacy, to title protection rights, to assisting applicants strengthen their applications.

== Executives ==
=== Past Presidents ===
2015- Pranay Chander (MSU-COM) and Sevan Evren (LMU-DCOM)

2014- Nick Church (UNE-COM) and Iain Jeffrey (TouroNY-COM)

2013- Dennis Fiddler (NSU-COM)

=== President ===
- Ravi Uppal - NSUCOM

=== Vice president ===
- Corey Mayer - LMU-DCOM

=== Director of Social Media ===
- Khashayar Farzam - UNECOM

=== Secretary ===
- Bianca Zapanta - Touro-COM

=== Director of Canadian Residencies ===
- Trevor Gill - Touro-COM

=== Director of US Residencies ===
- Amit Singh - KCUMB

=== Director of Pre-DO Societies ===
- PJ Parmar - KCUMB
