= The DO =

- Editor: Vania Manipod, DO
- Frequency: Monthly
- Circulation: Online publication
- Publisher: American Osteopathic Association
- First issue: 1927
- Country: United States
- Based in: Chicago
- Website: thedo.osteopathic.org

The DO is a monthly online magazine published by the American Osteopathic Association. According to its website, the magazine "contains news of the osteopathic profession and its members, articles of professional and personal interest to osteopathic physicians (D.O.), and osteopathic medical students, legislative developments, meeting coverage, clinical updates, and an extensive listing of osteopathic continuing medical education programs."

The title of the magazine refers to the initials of the degree held by osteopathic physicians in the United States, the Doctor of Osteopathic Medicine (D.O.) degree.

The magazine was established in April 1927, as The Forum of Osteopathy and obtained its current title in September 1960.
