= Pager Publications =

Pager Publications, Inc.
- Founded: July 21, 2014
- Type: 501c3 nonprofit corporation
- Services: administrative and financial support
- Key people: Founders Ajay Major, Aleena Paul and Erica Fugger
- Website: pagerpublications.org

Pager Publications, Inc. is a 501(c)(3) nonprofit literary organization that curates and supports peer-edited publications for the medical education community.

Pager Publications, Inc. was founded on July 21, 2014, in the State of Indiana as a nonprofit literary corporation by Ajay Major, Aleena Paul, and Erica Fugger. The corporation received its IRS 501(c)(3) nonprofit designation on January 29, 2015.

== Mission ==
The mission statement of Pager Publications, Inc. is as follows: "We strive to provide students and educators with dedicated spaces for the free expression of their distinctive voices."

== Publications ==
Pager Publications, Inc. currently provides financial and administrative support to the following publications:

- in-Training, the online peer-reviewed publication for medical students, at in-training.org
- in-House, the online peer-reviewed publication for residents & fellows, at in-housestaff.org
- The Palate, the online peer-reviewed publication for medical students at the intersection of nutrition and public health, at thepalate.org
- North Wing Magazine, the online magazine for student doctors originally founded in 1935 in Sheffield, UK, at northwingmagazine.org
- Mosaic in Medicine, the online peer-reviewed publication for underrepresented voices in medicine, at mosaicinmedicine.org
- Intervene Upstream, the online peer-reviewed public health publication for graduate students, at interveneupstream.org

== Books ==
Pager Publications, Inc. also functions as a publishing house and has published the following books:

- in-Training: Stories from Tomorrow's Physicians
- Family Doc Diary: A Resident Physician's Reflections in Fifty-Two Entries
- in-Training: Stories from Tomorrow's Physicians, Volume 2
- Salve: Words For The Journey
