= Osteopaths Act 1993 =

Act of the Parliament of the United Kingdom

Osteopaths Act 1993 (Note: Section 42(1).)
- Act of Parliament
- Parliament of the United Kingdom
- Long title: An Act to establish a body to be known as the General Osteopathic Council; to provide for the regulation of the profession of osteopathy, including making provision as to the registration of osteopaths and as to their professional education and conduct; to make provision in connection with the development and promotion of the profession; and for connected purposes.
- Citation: 1993 c. 21
- Territorial extent: United Kingdom (Note: Section 42(7). Section 38(1) and section 39(2) extended only to Great Britain, section 38(2)(c) and (e) only to Scotland, section 39(3) only to Northern Ireland, and section 38(2)(b) and (d) only to England and Wales.)

Dates
- Royal assent: 1 July 1993
- Commencement: 14 January 1997 (specified provisions); 1 April 1998 (specified provisions); 9 May 1998 (specified provisions); 5 July 1999 (specified provisions); 8 March 2000 (specified provisions); 9 May 2000 (specified provisions); 3 March 2002 (specified provisions); (Note: Section 42(2). The Osteopaths Act 1993 (Commencement No. 1 and Transitional Provision) Order 1997 (SI 1997/34), the Osteopaths Act 1993 (Commencement No. 2) Order 1998 (SI 1998/872), the Osteopaths Act 1993 (Commencement No. 3) Order 1998 (SI 1998/1138), the Osteopaths Act 1993 (Commencement No. 4) Order 1999 (SI 1999/1767), the Osteopaths Act 1993 (Commencement No. 5) Order 2000 (SI 2000/217), the Osteopaths Act 1993 (Commencement No. 6 and Transitional Provision) Order 2000 (SI 2000/1065) and the Osteopaths Act 1993 (Commencement No. 7) Order 2002 (SI 2002/500).)
Other legislation
| Amended by | Chiropractors Act 1994; Data Protection Act 1998; Competition Act 1998; National Health Service Reform and Health Care Professions Act 2002; Enterprise Act 2002; Health and Social Care (Community Health and Standards) Act 2003; Constitutional Reform Act 2005; Health Act 2006; European Qualifications (Health and Social Care Professions) Regulations 2007; Companies Act 2006 (Consequential Amendments etc) Order 2008; Health Care and Associated Professions (Miscellaneous Amendments) Order 2008; Health Care and Associated Professions (Miscellaneous Amendments and Practitioner Psychologists) Order 2009; Treaty of Lisbon (Changes in Terminology) Order 2011; Health and Social Care Act 2012; Crime and Courts Act 2013; Health Care and Associated Professions (Indemnity Arrangements) Order 2014; Health and Social Care (Safety and Quality) Act 2015; European Qualifications (Health and Social Care Professions) Regulations 2016; European Qualifications (Health and Social Care Professions) (Amendment etc.) (EU Exit) Regulations 2019; Recognition of Professional Qualifications and Implementation of International Recognition Agreements (Amendment) Regulations 2023; Recognition of Professional Qualifications and Implementation of International Recognition Agreements (Amendment) (Extension to Switzerland etc.) Regulations 2024 |

Status: Amended

Text of statute as originally enacted

Revised text of statute as amended

Text of the Osteopaths Act 1993 as in force today (including any amendments) within the United Kingdom, from legislation.gov.uk.

The Osteopaths Act 1993 (c. 21) is an act of the Parliament of the United Kingdom to regulate the pseudoscientific practice of osteopathy. It received royal assent on 1 July 1993.

The act created the General Osteopathic Council.

== Provisions ==
Section 1 of the act established the General Osteopathic Council as a body corporate, with the duty to develop, promote and regulate the profession of osteopathy. It provided for four statutory committees of the council: the Education Committee, the Investigating Committee, the Professional Conduct Committee and the Health Committee. Part I of the schedule dealt with the constitution of the council and part II with the statutory committees, and further provision about those matters could be made, at the council's request, by Order in Council.

Sections 2 to 10 of the act dealt with registration. The council appoints a Registrar of Osteopaths, who establishes and maintains the register of osteopaths. A person with a recognised qualification who is of good character and in good health is entitled to full registration. During a transitional period of two years from the opening of the register, established practitioners could instead obtain conditional registration, which lapsed after five years unless converted to full registration. The act also provided for provisional registration, suspension of registration, restoration to the register after removal, access to the register and the correction of fraud or error. Sections 11 to 18 dealt with professional education, including the Education Committee, visitors, the standard of proficiency, recognition of qualifications and post-registration training.

Sections 19 to 28 of the act dealt with professional conduct and fitness to practise. The council must publish a Code of Practice setting out the standards of conduct and practice expected of registered osteopaths. Allegations against registered osteopaths are considered by the Investigating Committee and referred to the Professional Conduct Committee or the Health Committee, which may impose sanctions including suspension and removal from the register, with provision for interim suspension, legal assessors and medical assessors. Sections 29 to 31 provided for appeals against decisions of the Registrar and the Health Committee, and for appeals against decisions of the Professional Conduct Committee and of appeal tribunals to the relevant court. That court is the High Court of Justice in England and Wales, the Court of Session in Scotland or the High Court of Justice in Northern Ireland, according to the address of the osteopath in the register.

Section 32 of the act makes it an offence for a person who is not a registered osteopath to describe himself as an osteopath or by a similar title, punishable on summary conviction by a fine not exceeding level 5 on the standard scale. The remaining provisions dealt with competition and anti-competitive practices (section 33), default powers of the Privy Council (section 34), the making of rules, which requires Privy Council approval (section 35), indemnity insurance (section 37), and data protection, rehabilitation of offenders and financial provisions (sections 38 to 40). Section 42 provided the short title, brought the act into force on days appointed by the Secretary of State by order, and extended it to the United Kingdom.

== Subsequent developments ==
The Chiropractors Act 1994 (c. 17) made consequential amendments to the act, in particular to sections 9, 13, 18, 20, 22, 27, 28, 30, 31 and 41, when it created the General Chiropractic Council on similar lines. Section 38, on data protection and access to personal health information, was repealed by the Data Protection Act 1998.

Paragraphs 1 to 14 of the schedule, which set out the constitution of the General Council, were replaced by new paragraphs 1A to 1D by the Health Care and Associated Professions (Miscellaneous Amendments) Order 2008 (SI 2008/1774), with effect from 9 July 2008 for specified purposes and from 1 April 2009 for the remainder.

Provision for the recognition of European qualifications, including a new section 5A, was inserted by the European Qualifications (Health and Social Care Professions) Regulations 2007 (SI 2007/3101) and section 5A was omitted by the European Qualifications (Health and Social Care Professions) (Amendment etc.) (EU Exit) Regulations 2019 (SI 2019/593). The Recognition of Professional Qualifications and Implementation of International Recognition Agreements (Amendment) Regulations 2023 (SI 2023/1286) inserted new provision for osteopaths holding qualifications from specified states, including sections 6A, 14A and 19A.
