= General Osteopathic Council =

Regulator of the practice of osteopathy in the United Kingdom

The General Osteopathic Council (GOsC) is the regulator of the practice of osteopathy in the United Kingdom.

The GOsC was established in 1997 following the Osteopaths Act 1993 to 'provide for the regulation of the profession of osteopathy' with the primary aim of protecting the public. It produced the first Statutory Register of Osteopaths in 2000. GOsC is one of nine UK healthcare regulators overseen by the Professional Standards Authority for Health and Social Care (PSA), an independent body accountable to the UK Parliament.

== Aims and operations ==
The aims of the GOsC are:

- To protect patients
- To develop the osteopathic profession
- To promote an understanding of osteopathic care

The work of the GOsC includes:

- Registering qualified professionals
- Setting standards of osteopathic practice and conduct
- Assuring the quality of osteopathic education
- Ensuring osteopaths undertake Continuing Professional Development
- Helping patients with complaints about an osteopath.

GOsC has a governing council consisting of 10 members (previously 14). The General Osteopathic Council (Constitution) (Amendment) Order 2015 allowed for this reduction, effective from 18 December 2015.
