= Journal of Osteopathic Medicine =

- Discipline: Osteopathic medicine
- Language: English
- Edited by: Ross D. Zafonte

Publication details
- Former name(s): The Journal of the American Osteopathic Association
- History: 1901–present
- Publisher: American Osteopathic Association (United States)
- Frequency: Monthly
- Open access: Yes

Standard abbreviations
- ISO 4: J. Osteopath. Med.

Indexing
- CODEN: JAOAAZ
- ISSN: 0098-6151 (print); 1945-1997 (web)
- LCCN: 90641783
- OCLC no.: 01081714

Links
- Journal homepage; Online access; Online archive

Journal of Osteopathic Medicine (JOM) is a monthly peer-reviewed open access medical journal published by the American Osteopathic Association. The journal primarily publishes original research publications and editorial articles. The editor-in-chief is Ross Zafonte. Founded in 1901, the journal was known as the Journal of the American Osteopathic Association until January 2021, when it adopted its current name.

The journal is abstracted and indexed in PubMed/MEDLINE. It publishes case reports, clinical images, editorials, meta-analyses, original research, and review articles on all major areas of medicine, including osteopathic manipulative medicine. The journal also publishes content on medical education, ethics, and health care reform.

== History ==
The journal was established in 1901. It was published bimonthly for the first year; starting in 1902 it was published monthly.

In January 2020, the JAOA changed its name to the "Journal of Osteopathic Medicine." The same month, the journal became open access, making content free accessible, and began publishing articles exclusively online.

== See also ==
- List of medical journals
