= Norman Gevitz =

- Education: New York University, University of Chicago
- Occupations: Writer, Professor
- Writing career
- Subjects: Osteopathic Medicine, History of medicine

Norman Gevitz is a medical sociologist and historian and academic administrator. He has written numerous books and papers on the history of medicine in the United States and England. He is perhaps best known for his book, The D.O.s: Osteopathic Medicine in America, where he discusses the history of the profession osteopathic medicine in the United States.

Gevitz formerly taught at the University of Illinois College of Medicine at Chicago, the Ohio University College of Osteopathic Medicine, and the New York Institute of Technology College of Osteopathic Medicine. He is currently a professor and Senior Vice President of Academic Affairs at A.T. Still University.

Gevitz also wrote Other Healers: Unorthodox Medicine in America, and co-wrote Beyond Flexner: Medical Education in the Twentieth Century.

== Education ==
Norman Gevitz studied political science at New York University, graduating with a Bachelor of Arts in 1970, and then a Master of Arts in 1971. After moving to the University of Chicago where he studied sociology, earning a Doctor of Philosophy (PhD) in 1980.
