= American Osteopathic Association =

American professional association

Coordinates: 41.8942°N 87.6190°W

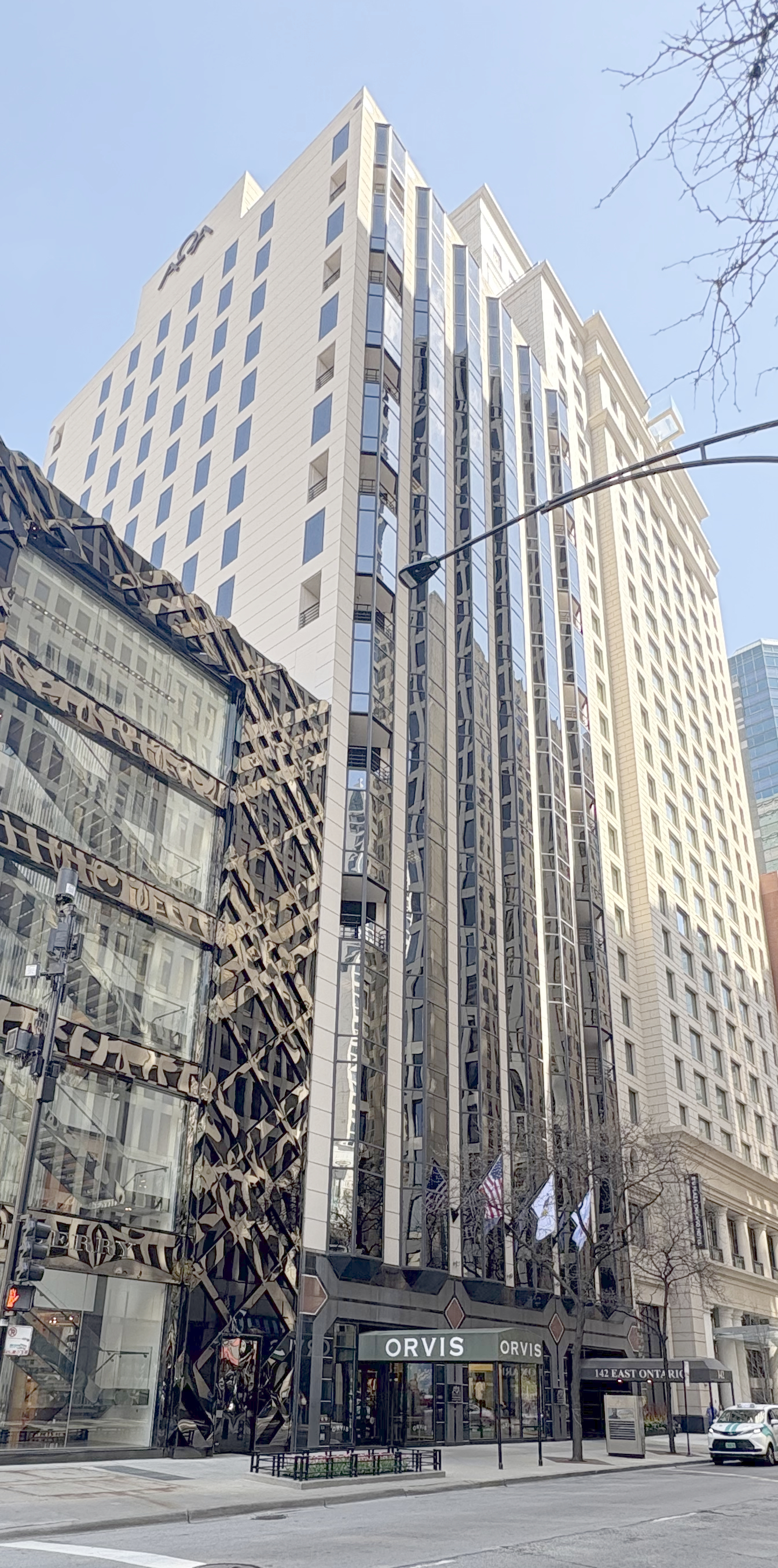
- AOA headquarters in Chicago
- Abbreviation: AOA
- Formation: April 19, 1897
- Type: Professional association
- Headquarters: Chicago, Illinois
- Location: United States
- Official language: English
- President: Robert Piccinini, DO
- CEO: Kathleen S. Creason, MBA
- Website: osteopathic.org

The American Osteopathic Association (AOA) is the representative member organization for the more than 207,000 osteopathic medical doctors (D.O.s) and osteopathic medical students in the United States. The AOA is headquartered in Chicago, Illinois, and is involved in post-graduate training for osteopathic physicians. Since 2015, it has been accrediting post-graduate education as a committee within the Accreditation Council for Graduate Medical Education, creating a unified accreditation system for all DOs and MDs in the United States. The organization promotes public health, encourages academic scientific research, serves as the primary certifying body for D.O.s overseeing 18 certifying boards, and is the accrediting agency for osteopathic medical schools through its Commission on Osteopathic College Accreditation. As of October 2015, the AOA no longer owns the Healthcare Facilities Accreditation Program (HFAP), which accredited hospitals and other health care facilities.

The AOA has held yearly conventions since its founding in 1897. The AOA also manages DOCARE International, a non-profit charitable organization. The AOA also publishes The DO, an online publication, and The Journal of the American Osteopathic Association, a peer-reviewed medical journal.

== History ==
The association was founded as the American Association for the Advancement of Osteopathy on April 19, 1897, in Kirksville, Missouri, by students of the American School of Osteopathy specifically Andrew Taylor Still. It was renamed the American Osteopathic Association in 1901.

In September 1901, the AOA began publishing a scientific journal entitled the Journal of the American Osteopathic Association. Subscriptions were offered to AOA members, and at the time, membership fees were $5 annually. The journal was published bimonthly for the first year, then monthly thereafter. In 1903, the AOA conducted the first accreditation survey of osteopathic medical schools. Three years later, the American Medical Association conducted its first accreditation survey of US MD-granting medical schools. In April 1927, the AOA began publishing The Forum of Osteopathy, a monthly magazine that covered news relating to osteopathic medicine, the AOA, and related groups. In September 1960, the magazine was renamed The DO.

In the early 1900s, the AOA, citing concerns about safety and efficacy, was opposed to the introduction of pharmacology into the curriculum of osteopathic medicine. However, in 1929, the AOA board of trustees voted to allow the teaching of pharmacology in D.O. schools. By 1938, the AOA began requiring that osteopathic medical students have at least 1 year of undergraduate college coursework, and by 1940, the AOA required two years. In 1943, the AOA founded the Healthcare Facilities Accreditation Program (HFAP), an organization that accredits hospitals and other health care facilities.

In 1957, the U.S. Department of Health, Education, and Welfare recognized the AOA as the official accrediting body for osteopathic medical education. In 1967, the National Commission on Accrediting (currently the Council for Higher Education Accreditation) recognized the AOA as the official accrediting agency for all aspects of osteopathic medical education. The Department of Health, Education and Welfare (currently the Department of Health and Human Services) recognized the AOA as the official accrediting body for osteopathic hospitals under Medicare in 1966. In October 2015, the AOA sold the Healthcare Facilities Accreditation Program to the Accreditation Association for Hospitals/Health Systems.

In 2016, a group of D.O. physicians filed an antitrust lawsuit against the AOA (Talone et al. v. The American Osteopathic Association), contesting the requirement for physicians to purchase AOA membership as a condition of AOA board certification. In 2018, the AOA and physicians reached a $35 million settlement agreement. As a part of the settlement, the AOA agreed to end its policy of requiring physicians to purchase AOA membership to receive AOA board certification. The settlement was finalized in 2019.

In 2021, the AOA filed a lawsuit against the American Board of Internal Medicine (ABIM). The lawsuit was directed at the ABIM policy requiring program directors to be board-certified by the ABIM, and for graduates of that residency to be eligible for ABIM board certification.

The AOA supports the annual "D.O. Day on Capitol Hill," where more than 1,000 osteopathic physicians (D.O.s) and osteopathic medical students go to Washington, D.C., to meet with members of Congress to discuss current healthcare issues, such as challenges in accessing care. The event serves as an opportunity for legislators to learn more about health care and osteopathic medicine and for medical students to become more familiar with the political process.

== Osteopathic post-graduate education ==
The AOA also provides funding for post-graduate osteopathic medical residencies. In the 2017 match, more than 2,200 osteopathic physicians matched into these residency programs. In February 2014, the AOA and AACOM decided to join with ACGME to form a unified post-graduate accreditation system.

- From July 1, 2015, to June 30, 2020, AOA-accredited training programs will transition to ACGME recognition and accreditation.
- There will continue to be osteopathic-focused training programs under the ACGME accreditation system. Two osteopathic review committees will be developed to evaluate and set standards for the osteopathic aspects of training programs seeking osteopathic recognition.
- DOs and MDs would have access to all training programs. There will be prerequisite competencies and a recommended training program for MD graduates who apply to osteopathic-focused programs.
- AOA and AACOM will become ACGME member organizations, and each will have representation on ACGME's board of directors.

== Publications ==
The American Osteopathic Association publishes The DO, an online publication covering news related to osteopathic medicine, legislation, health care changes, and osteopathic continuing medical education programs.

The AOA also publishes The Journal of the American Osteopathic Association, a monthly peer-reviewed medical journal focusing on original research and editorial articles.

== DOCARE International ==
DOCARE International is a non-profit medical charity serving remote areas of the Western Hemisphere. DOCARE International primarily operates in the Caribbean, Africa, South America, and Central America. DOCARE is operated by the American Osteopathic Association, and consists of osteopathic physicians, osteopathic medical students, M.D. physicians, and other healthcare professionals.

== See also ==
- American Association of Colleges of Osteopathic Medicine
- The DO
- Journal of the American Osteopathic Association
- Student Osteopathic Medical Association
