= Osteopathy =

Pseudoscientific alternative medicine emphasizing muscle and bone manipulation

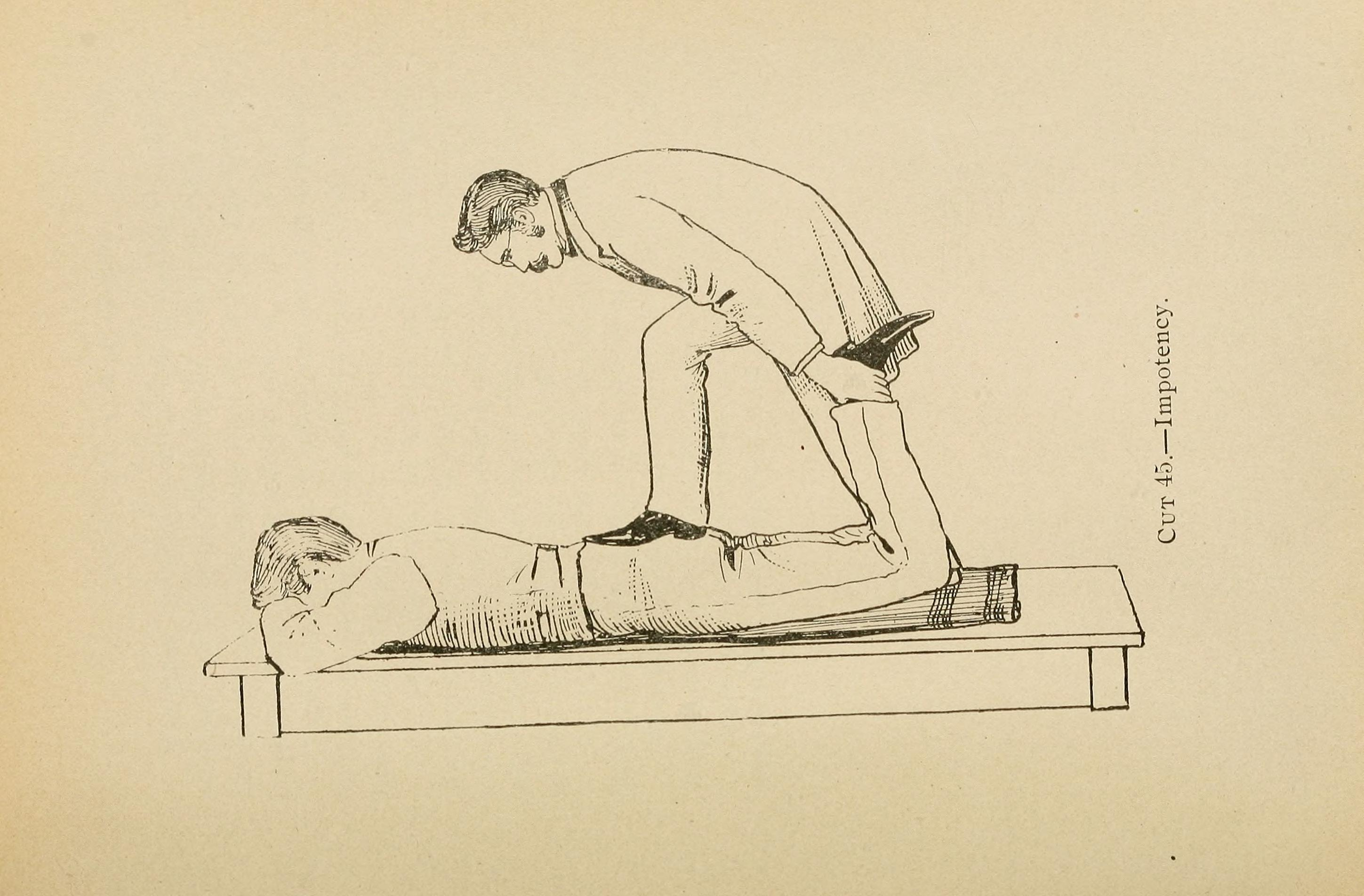
- OMT technique for the treatment of impotence in the 1898 Osteopathy Complete manual

Alternative therapy
- MeSH: D026301
- ICD-10-PCS: 7
- ICD-9-CM: 93.6

Osteopathy is a pseudoscientific system of alternative medicine that emphasizes physical manipulation of the body's muscle tissue and bones. In most countries, practitioners of osteopathy are not medically trained and are referred to as osteopaths. It is distinct from osteopathic medicine, which is a branch of the medical profession in the United States.

Osteopathic manipulation is the core set of techniques in osteopathy. Parts of osteopathy, such as craniosacral therapy, have been described by Quackwatch as having no therapeutic value and have been labeled by them as pseudoscience and quackery. The techniques are based on an ideology created by Andrew Taylor Still (1828–1917) that posits the existence of a "myofascial continuity"—a tissue layer that "links every part of the body with every other part". Osteopaths attempt to diagnose and treat what was originally called "the osteopathic lesion", but which is now named "somatic dysfunction", by manipulating a person's bones and muscles. Osteopathic Manipulative Treatment (OMT) techniques are most commonly used to treat back pain and other musculoskeletal issues.

Osteopathic manipulation is still included in the curricula of osteopathic physicians or Doctors of Osteopathic Medicine (DO) training in the US; however, the Doctor of Osteopathic Medicine degree became a medical degree and is no longer a degree of non-medical osteopathy.

== History ==
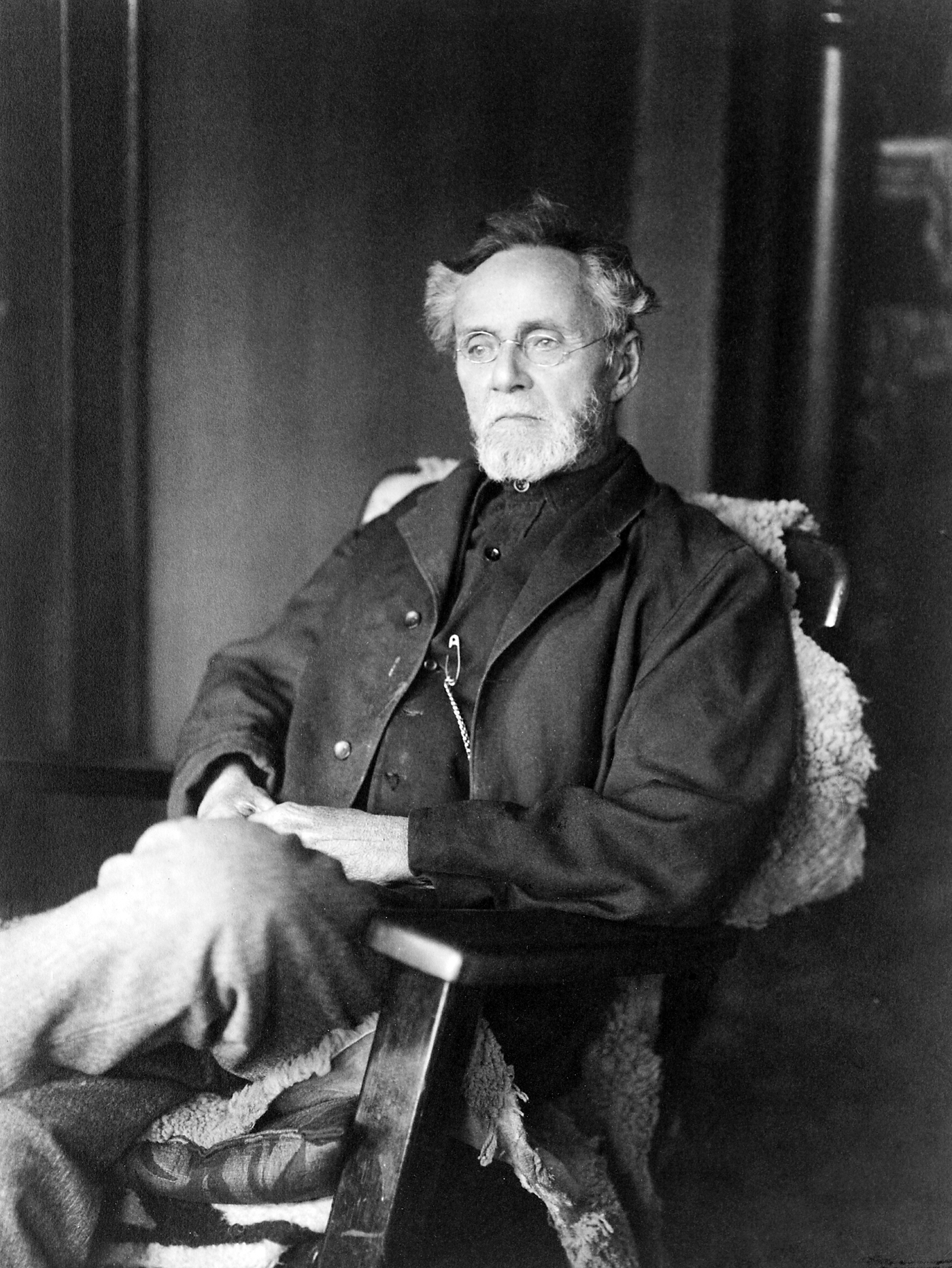
Andrew Taylor Still in 1914

The practice of osteopathy (from Ancient Greek ὀστέον (ostéon) 'bone' and πάθος (páthos) 'pain, suffering') began in the United States in 1874. The profession was founded by Andrew Taylor Still, a 19th-century American physician (MD), Civil War surgeon, and Kansas territorial and state legislator. He lived near Baldwin City, Kansas, during the American Civil War and it was there that he founded the practice of osteopathy. Still claimed that human illness was rooted in problems with the musculoskeletal system, and that osteopathic manipulations could solve these problems by harnessing the body's own self-repairing potential. Still's patients were forbidden from treatment by conventional medicine, as well as from other practices such as drinking alcohol. These practices derive from the belief, common in the early 19th century among proponents of alternative medicine, that the body's natural state tends toward health and inherently contains the capacity to battle any illness. This was opposed to orthodox practitioners, who held that intervention by a physician was necessary to restore health in the patient. Still established the basis for osteopathy, and the division between alternative medicine and traditional medicine had already been a major conflict for decades.

The foundations of this divergence may be traced back to the mid-18th century when advances in physiology began to localize the causes and nature of diseases to specific organs and tissues. Doctors began shifting their focus from the patient to the internal state of the body, resulting in an issue labeled as the problem of the "vanishing patient". A stronger movement towards experimental and scientific medicine was then developed. In the perspective of the DO physicians, the sympathy and holism that were integral to medicine in the past were left behind. Heroic medicine became the convention for treating patients, with aggressive practices like bloodletting and prescribing chemicals such as mercury, becoming the forefront in therapeutics. Alternative medicine had its beginnings in the early 19th century, when gentler practices in comparison to heroic medicine began to emerge. As each side sought to defend its practice, a schism began to present itself in the medical marketplace, with both practitioners attempting to discredit the other. The osteopathic physicians—those who are now referred to as DOs—argued that the non-osteopathic physicians had an overly mechanistic approach to treating patients, treated the symptoms of disease instead of the original causes, and were blind to the harm they were causing their patients. Other practitioners had a similar argument, labeling osteopathic medicine as unfounded, passive, and dangerous to a disease-afflicted patient. This was the medical environment that pervaded throughout the 19th century, and the setting Still entered when he began developing his idea of osteopathy.

After experiencing the loss of his wife and three daughters to spinal meningitis and noting that the current orthodox medical system could not save them, Still may have been prompted to shape his reformist attitudes towards conventional medicine. Still set out to reform the orthodox medical scene and establish a practice that did not so readily resort to drugs, purgatives, and harshly invasive therapeutics to treat a person suffering from ailment, similar to the mindset of the irregulars in the early 19th century. Thought to have been influenced by spiritualist figures such as Andrew Jackson Davis and ideas of magnetic and electrical healing, Still began practicing manipulative procedures that intended to restore harmony in the body. Over the course of the next twenty five years, Still attracted support for his medical philosophy that disapproved of orthodox medicine, and shaped his philosophy for osteopathy. Components included the idea that structure and function are interrelated and the importance of each piece of the body in the harmonious function of its whole.

Still sought to establish a new medical school that could produce physicians trained under this philosophy, and be prepared to compete against the orthodox physicians. He established the American School of Osteopathy on 20 May 1892, in Kirksville, Missouri, with twenty-one students in the first class. Still described the foundations of osteopathy in his book "The Philosophy and Mechanical Principles of Osteopathy" in 1892. He named his new school of medicine "osteopathy", reasoning that "the bone, osteon, was the starting point from which [he] was to ascertain the cause of pathological conditions". He would eventually claim that he could "shake a child and stop scarlet fever, croup, diphtheria, and cure whooping cough in three days by a wring of its neck."

When the state of Missouri granted the right to award the MD degree, he remained dissatisfied with the limitations of conventional medicine and instead chose to retain the distinction of the DO degree. In the early 20th century, osteopaths across the United States sought to establish law that would legitimize their medical degree to the standard of the modern medic. The processes were arduous, and not without conflict. In some states, it took years for the bills to be passed. Osteopaths were often ridiculed and in some cases arrested, but in each state, osteopaths managed to achieve the legal acknowledgement and action they set out to pursue. In 1898 the American Institute of Osteopathy started the Journal of Osteopathy and by that time four states recognized osteopathy as a profession.

== Practice ==
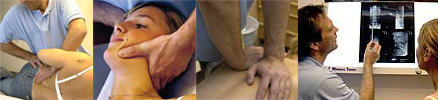
Osteopathic manipulative treatment (OMT) involves palpation and manipulation of bones, muscles, joints, and fasciae.

According to the American Osteopathic Association (AOA), osteopathic manipulative treatment (OMT) is considered to be only one component of osteopathic medicine and may be used alone or in combination with pharmacotherapy, rehabilitation, surgery, patient education, diet, and exercise. OMT techniques are not necessarily unique to osteopathic medicine; other disciplines, such as physical therapy or chiropractic, use similar techniques. Indeed, many DOs do not practice OMT at all, and, over time, DOs in general practice use OMT less and less and instead apply the common medical treatments.

One integral tenet of osteopathy is that problems in the body's anatomy can affect its proper functioning. Another tenet is the body's innate ability to heal itself. Many of osteopathic medicine's manipulative techniques are aimed at reducing or eliminating the impediments to proper structure and function so the self-healing mechanism can assume its role in restoring a person to health. Osteopathic medicine defines a concept of health care that embraces the concept of the unity of the living organism's structure (anatomy) and function (physiology). The AOA states that the four major principles of osteopathic medicine are the following:

1. The body is an integrated unit of mind, body, and spirit.
2. The body possesses self-regulatory mechanisms, having the inherent capacity to defend, repair, and remodel itself.
3. Structure and function are reciprocally interrelated.
4. Rational therapy is based on consideration of the first three principles.

These principles are not held by Doctors of Osteopathic Medicine to be empirical laws; they serve, rather, as the underpinnings of the osteopathic approach to health and disease.

=== Muscle energy ===
Muscle energy techniques address somatic dysfunction through stretching and muscle contraction. For example, if a person is unable to fully abduct their arm, the treating physician raises the patient's arm near the end of the patient's range of motion, also called the edge of the restrictive barrier. The patient then tries to lower their arm, while the physician provides resistance. This resistance against the patient's motion allows for isotonic contraction of the patient's muscle. Once the patient relaxes, their range of motion increases slightly. The repetition of alternating cycles of contraction and subsequent relaxation help the treated muscle improve its range of motion. Muscle energy techniques are contraindicated in patients with fractures, crush injuries, joint dislocations, joint instability, severe muscle spasms or strains, severe osteoporosis, severe whiplash injury, vertebrobasilar insufficiency, severe illness, and recent surgery.

=== Counterstrain ===
Counterstrain is a system of diagnosis and treatment that considers the physical dysfunction to be a continuing, inappropriate strain reflex, which is inhibited during treatment by applying a position of mild strain in the direction exactly opposite to that of the reflex. After a counterstrain point tender to palpation has been diagnosed, the identified tender point is treated by the osteopathic physician who, while monitoring the tender point, positions the patient such that the point is no longer tender to palpation. This position is held for ninety seconds and the patient is subsequently returned to their normal posture. Most often this position of ease is usually achieved by shortening the muscle of interest. Improvement or resolution of the tenderness at the identified counterstrain point is the desired outcome. The use of counterstrain technique is contraindicated in patients with severe osteoporosis, pathology of the vertebral arteries, and in patients who are very ill or cannot voluntarily relax during the procedure.

=== High-velocity, low-amplitude manipulation ===
High velocity, low amplitude (HVLA) manipulation is a technique which employs a rapid, targeted, therapeutic force of brief duration that travels a short distance within the anatomic range of motion of a joint and engages the restrictive barrier in one or more places of motion to elicit release of restriction. The use of HVLA is contraindicated in patients with Down syndrome due to instability of the atlantoaxial joint which may stem from ligamentous laxity, and in pathologic bone conditions such as fracture, history of a pathologic fracture, osteomyelitis, osteoporosis, and severe cases of rheumatoid arthritis. HVLA is also contraindicated in patients with vascular disease such as aneurysms, or disease of the carotid arteries or vertebral arteries. People taking ciprofloxacin or anticoagulants, or who have local metastases should not receive HVLA.

=== Myofascial release ===
Myofascial release is a form of alternative treatment. The practitioners claim to treat skeletal muscle immobility and pain by relaxing contracted muscles. Palpatory feedback by the practitioner is said to be an integral part to achieving a release of myofascial tissues, accomplished by relaxing contracted muscles, increasing circulation and lymphatic drainage, and stimulating the stretch reflex of muscles and overlying fascia.

Practitioners who perform myofascial release consider the fascia and its corresponding muscle to be the main targets of their procedure, but assert that other tissue may be affected as well, including other connective tissue. Fascia is the soft tissue component of the connective tissue that provides support and protection for most structures within the human body, including muscle. This soft tissue can become restricted due to psychogenic disease, overuse, trauma, infectious agents, or inactivity, often resulting in pain, muscle tension, and corresponding diminished blood flow.

Some osteopaths search for small lumps of tissue, called "Chapman release points" as part of their diagnostic procedure.

=== Lymphatic pump treatment ===
Lymphatic pump treatment (LPT) is a manual technique intended to encourage lymph flow in a person's lymphatic system. The first modern lymphatic pump technique was developed in 1920, although osteopathic physicians used various forms of lymphatic techniques as early as the late 19th century.

Relative contraindications for the use of lymphatic pump treatments include fractures, abscesses or localized infections, and severe bacterial infections with body temperature elevated higher than 102 °F (39 °C).

== Effectiveness ==
A 2005 Cochrane review of osteopathic manipulative treatment (OMT) in asthma treatment concluded that there was insufficient evidence that OMT can be used to treat asthma.

In 2013, a Cochrane review reviewed six randomized controlled trials which investigated the effect of four types of chest physiotherapy (including OMT) as adjunctive treatments for pneumonia in adults and concluded that "based on current limited evidence, chest physiotherapy might not be recommended as routine additional treatment for pneumonia in adults." Techniques investigated in the study included paraspinal inhibition, rib raising, and myofascial release. The review found that OMT did not reduce mortality and did not increase cure rate, but that OMT slightly reduced the duration of hospital stay and antibiotic use. A 2013 systematic review of the use of OMT for treating pediatric conditions concluded that its effectiveness was unproven.

In 2014, a systematic review and meta-analysis of 15 randomized controlled trials found moderate-quality evidence that OMT reduces pain and improves functional status in acute and chronic nonspecific low back pain. The same analysis also found moderate-quality evidence for pain reduction for nonspecific low back pain in postpartum women and low-quality evidence for pain reduction in nonspecific low back pain in pregnant women. A 2013 systematic review found insufficient evidence to rate osteopathic manipulation for chronic nonspecific low back pain. In 2011, a systematic review found no compelling evidence that osteopathic manipulation was effective for the treatment of musculoskeletal pain.

A 2018 systematic review found that there is no evidence for the reliability or specific efficacy of the techniques used in visceral osteopathy.

The New England Journal of Medicine's 4 November 1999 issue concluded that patients with chronic low back pain can be treated effectively with manipulation. The United Kingdom's National Health Service says there is "limited evidence" that osteopathy "may be effective for some types of neck, shoulder or lower limb pain and recovery after hip or knee operations", but that there is no evidence that osteopathy is effective as a treatment for health conditions unrelated to the bones and muscles. Others have concluded that there is insufficient evidence to suggest efficacy for osteopathic style manipulation in treating musculoskeletal pain.

== Criticism ==
The American Medical Association listed DOs as "cultists" and deemed MD consultation of DOs unethical from 1923 until 1962. MDs regarded that osteopathic treatments were rooted in "pseudoscientific dogma", and although physicians from both branches of medicine have been able to meet on common ground, tensions between the two continue.

In 1988, Petr Skrabanek classified osteopathy as one of the "paranormal" forms of alternative medicine, commenting that it has a view of disease which had no meaning outside its own closed system.

In a 1995 conference address, the president of the Association of American Medical Colleges, Jordan J. Cohen, pinpointed OMT as a defining difference between MDs and DOs; while he saw there was no quarrel in the appropriateness of manipulation for musculoskeletal treatment, the difficulty centered on "applying manipulative therapy to treat other systemic diseases"—at that point, Cohen maintained, "we enter the realm of skepticism on the part of the allopathic world."

In 1998, Stephen Barrett of Quackwatch said that the worth of manipulative therapy had been exaggerated and that the American Osteopathic Association (AOA) was acting unethically by failing to condemn craniosacral therapy. The article attracted a letter from the law firm representing the AOA accusing Barrett of libel and demanding an apology to avert legal action. In response, Barrett made some slight modifications to his text, while maintaining its overall stance; he queried the AOA's reference to "the body's natural tendency toward good health", and challenged them to "provide [him] with adequate scientific evidence showing how this belief has been tested and demonstrated to be true." Barrett has been quoted as saying, "the pseudoscience within osteopathy can't compete with the science".

In 1999, Joel D. Howell noted that osteopathy and medicine as practiced by MDs were becoming increasingly convergent. He suggested that this raised a paradox: "if osteopathy has become the functional equivalent of allopathy, what is the justification for its continued existence? And if there is value in therapy that is uniquely osteopathic – that is, based on osteopathic manipulation or other techniques – why should its use be limited to osteopaths?"

In 2004, the osteopathic physician Bryan E. Bledsoe, a professor of emergency medicine, wrote disparagingly of the "pseudoscience" at the foundation of OMT. In his view, "OMT will and should follow homeopathy, magnetic healing, chiropractic, and other outdated practices into the pages of medical history."

In 2010, Steven Salzberg wrote that OMT was promoted as a special distinguishing element of DO training, but that it amounted to no more than "'extra' training in pseudoscientific practices." It has been suggested that osteopathic physicians may be more likely than MDs to be involved in questionable practices such as orthomolecular therapy and homeopathy.

Science writer Harriet Hall stated that DOs trained in the U.S. are Doctors of Osteopathic Medicine and are legally equivalent to MDs. "They must be distinguished from 'osteopaths', members of a less regulated or unregulated profession that is practiced in many countries. Osteopaths get inferior training that can't be compared to that of DOs."

== Regulation and legal status ==
The osteopathic profession has evolved into two branches: non-physician manual medicine osteopaths and full-scope medical practice osteopathic physicians. The two groups are so distinct that in practice they function as separate professions. The regulation of non-physician manual medicine osteopaths varies greatly between jurisdictions. In Australia, Denmark, New Zealand, Switzerland, the UAE and the UK, non-physician manual medicine osteopaths are regulated by statute; their practice of osteopathy requires registration with the relevant regulatory authority. The Osteopathic International Alliance (OIA) publishes a country guide that details registration and practice rights, while the International Osteopathic Association maintains a list of all accredited osteopathic colleges.

Several international and national organizations are involved in osteopathic education and political advocacy. The OIA is an international body that oversees national osteopathic and osteopathic medical associations, statutory regulators, and universities or medical schools offering osteopathic and osteopathic medical education.

The following sections describe the legal status of osteopathy and osteopathic medicine in each country listed.

=== Australia ===
A majority of osteopaths work in private practice, with osteopaths working within aged care, traffic and workers compensation schemes or co-located with medical practitioners. Osteopaths are not considered physicians or medical doctors in Australia, rather as allied health professionals offering private practice care. The majority of private health insurance providers cover treatment performed by osteopaths, as do many government based schemes such as veteran's affairs or workers compensations schemes In addition, treatment performed by osteopaths is covered by the public healthcare system in Australia (Medicare) under the Chronic Disease Management plan.

Osteopathy Australia (formerly the Australian Osteopathic Association) is a national organization representing the interests of Australian osteopaths, osteopathy as a profession in Australia, and consumers' right to access osteopathic services. Founded in 1955 in Victoria, the Australian Osteopathic Association became a national body in 1991 and became Osteopathy Australia in 2014. and is a member of the Osteopathic International Alliance.

The Osteopathy Board of Australia is part of the Australian Health Practitioner Regulation Agency which is the regulatory body for all recognized health care professions in Australia. The Osteopathic Board of Australia is separate from the Medical Board of Australia which is the governing body that regulates medical practitioners. Osteopaths trained internationally may be eligible for registration in Australia, dependent on their level of training and following relevant competency assessment.

Students training to be an osteopath in Australia must study in an approved program in an accredited university. Current accredited courses are either four or five years in length. To achieve accreditation universities courses must demonstrate the capabilities of graduates. The capabilities are based on the CanMEDS competency framework that was developed by the Royal College of Physicians and Surgeons of Canada.

A 2018 large scale study, representing a response rate of 49.1% of the profession indicated the average age of the participants was 38.0 years, with 58.1% being female and the majority holding a Bachelor or higher degree qualification for osteopathy. The study also estimated a total of 3.9 million patients consulted osteopaths every year in Australia. Most osteopaths work in referral relationships with a range of other health services, managing patients primarily with musculoskeletal disorders.

=== Canada ===
In Canada, the titles "osteopath" and "osteopathic physician" are protected in some provinces by the medical regulatory college for physicians and surgeons. As of 2011, there were approximately 20 U.S.-trained osteopathic physicians, all of which held a Doctor of Osteopathic Medicine degree, practicing in all of Canada. As of 2014, no training programs have been established for osteopathic physicians in Canada.

The non-physician manual practice of osteopathy is practiced in most Canadian provinces. As of 2014, manual osteopathic practice is not a government-regulated health profession in any province, and those interested in pursuing osteopathic studies must register in private osteopathy schools. It is estimated that there are over 1,300 osteopathic manual practitioners in Canada, most of whom practice in Quebec and Ontario. Some sources indicate that there are between 1,000 and 1,200 osteopaths practicing in the province of Quebec, and although this number might seem quite elevated, many osteopathy clinics are adding patients on waiting lists due to a shortage of osteopaths in the province.

==== Quebec ====
Beginning in 2009, Université Laval in Quebec City was working with the Collège d'études ostéopathiques in Montreal on a project to implement a professional osteopathy program consisting of a bachelor's degree followed by a professional master's degree in osteopathy as manual therapy. However, due to the many doubts concerning the scientific credibility of osteopathy from the university's faculty of medicine, the program developers decided to abandon the project in 2011, after 2 1/2 years of discussion, planning, and preparation for the program implementation. There was some controversy with the final decision of the university's committee regarding the continuous undergraduate and professional graduate program in osteopathy because the Commission of studies, which is in charge of evaluating new training programs offered by the university, had judged that the program had its place at Université Laval before receiving the unfavourable support decision from the faculty of medicine. Had the program been implemented, Université Laval would have been the first university institution in Quebec to offer a professional program in osteopathy as a manual therapy.

=== Egypt and the Middle East ===
Hesham Khalil introduced osteopathy in the Middle East at a local physical therapy conference in Cairo, Egypt in 2005 with a lecture titled "The global Osteopathic Concept / Holistic approach in Somatic Dysfunction". Since then he has toured the Middle East to introduce osteopathy in other Middle Eastern and North African countries, including Sudan, Jordan, Saudi Arabia, Qatar, UAE, Kuwait and Oman. In December 2007 the first Workshop on Global osteopathic approach was held at the Nasser Institute Hospital for Research and Treatment, sponsored by the Faculty of Physical Therapy, University of Cairo, Egypt. On 6 August 2010, the Egyptian Osteopathic Society (OsteoEgypt) was founded. OsteoEgypt promotes a two-tier model of osteopathy in Egypt and the Middle East. The event was timed to coincide with the birthday of A.T. Still.

==== Israel ====
Osteopathy in Israel is registered under Osteopathy Europe and the Israeli Osteopathic Association, a non-profit organization that works to advance professional standards and promote future statutory regulation and academic recognition of the profession. Two institutions offer dedicated osteopathy education through multi-year (4.5–5 year) programs: the Israeli Institute for Osteopathic Studies at the Levinsky-Wingate Academic College, and The Center for Osteopathic Studies at the Tel Aviv–Yafo Academic College. The practice of osteopathy in Israel is not regulated by law, and there is no government licensing for the profession. However, osteopaths work in private clinics and within complementary medicine frameworks in health insurance funds and hospitals, including the Hadassah Medical University Center{{In lang|he}}, Leumit Health Fund, MaccabiTivi Health Fund, and Meuchedet Health Fund. The Israeli Osteopathy Association {{In lang|he}} launched its official website on April 28, 2026.

=== European Union ===
There is no European regulatory authority for the practice of osteopathy or osteopathic medicine within the European Union; each country has its own rules. The UK's General Osteopathic Council, a regulatory body set up under the country's Osteopaths Act 1993, issued a position paper on European regulation of osteopathy in 2005.

==== Belgium ====
Since the early 1970s, osteopaths have been practicing in Belgium, during which time several attempts have been made to obtain an official status of health care profession. In 1999, a law was voted (the 'Colla-Law') providing a legal framework for osteopathy, amongst three other non-conventional medical professions. In 2011, the former Belgian Minister Onkelinx set up the Chambers for Non-Conventional Medicines and the Joint Commission provided for in the "Colla-law" (1999). Their goal was to discuss and reach an agreement between the various medical professions to rule on these practices. In February 2014, only one practice, homeopathy, received its recognition. The others, including osteopathy, remain unresolved.

==== Finland ====
Osteopathy has been a recognized health profession since 1994 in Finland. It is regulated by law along with chiropractors and naprapaths. These professions require at least a four-year education. Currently there are three osteopathic schools in Finland, one which is public and two private ones.

==== France ====
Osteopathy is a governmentally recognized profession and has title protection, autorisation d'utiliser le titre d'ostéopathe. The most recent decree regarding osteopathy was enacted in 2014.

==== Germany ====
Germany has both osteopathy and osteopathic medicine. There is a difference in the osteopathic education between non-physician osteopaths, physiotherapists, and medical physicians.

Physiotherapists are a recognized health profession and can achieve a degree of "Diploma in Osteopathic Therapy (D.O.T.)". Non-physician osteopaths are not medically licensed. They have an average total of 1200 hours of training, roughly half being in manual therapy and osteopathy, with no medical specialization before they attain their degree. Non-physician osteopaths in Germany officially work under the "Heilpraktiker" law. Heilpraktiker is a separate profession within the health care system. There are many schools of osteopathy in Germany; most are moving toward national recognition although such recognition does not currently exist. In Germany, there are state level rules governing which persons (non-physicians) may call themselves osteopaths.

==== Portugal ====
Osteopathy is a governmentally recognized health profession and the title of Osteopath is protected by Law (Act 45/2003, of 22 October, and Act 71/2013, of 2 September). Currently there are eight faculties that teach the four-year degree course of osteopathy (BSc Hon in Osteopathy).

=== India ===
Sri Sri University offers BSc and MSc Osteopathy programmes.

=== New Zealand ===
The practice of osteopathy is regulated by law, under the terms of the Health Practitioners Competence Assurance Act 2003 which came into effect on 18 September 2004. Under the act, it is a legal requirement to be registered with the Osteopathic Council of New Zealand (OCNZ), and to hold an annual practicing certificate issued by them, in order to practice as an osteopath. Each of the fifteen health professions regulated by the HPCA act work within the "Scope of Practice" determined and published by its professional board or council. Osteopaths in New Zealand are not fully licensed physicians. In New Zealand, in addition to the general scope of practice, osteopaths may also hold the Scope of Practice for Osteopaths using western medical acupuncture and related needling techniques.

In New Zealand a course is offered at the Unitec Institute of Technology (Unitec). Australasian courses consist of a bachelor's degree in clinical science (osteopathy) followed by a master's degree. The Unitec double degree programme is the OCNZ prescribed qualification for registration in the scope of practice: Australian qualifications accredited by the Australian and New Zealand Osteopathic Council are also prescribed qualifications.

Osteopaths registered and in good standing with the Australian Health Practitioner Regulation Agency – Osteopathy Board of Australian are eligible to register in New Zealand under the mutual recognition system operating between the two countries. Graduates from programs in every other country are required to complete an assessment procedure.

The scope of practice for US-trained osteopathic physicians is unlimited on an exceptions basis. Full licensure to practice medicine is awarded on an exceptions basis following a hearing before the licensing authorities in New Zealand. Both the Medical Council of New Zealand and the OCNZ regulate osteopathic physicians in New Zealand. Currently, the country has no recognized osteopathic medical schools.

=== United Kingdom ===
The British School of Osteopathy (now the University College of Osteopathy) was the first school of osteopathy in Britain, established in London in 1917 by John Martin Littlejohn, a pupil of A.T. Still, who had been Dean of the Chicago College of Osteopathic Medicine. After many years of existing outside the mainstream of health care provision, the osteopathic profession in the United Kingdom was accorded formal recognition by Parliament by the Osteopaths Act 1993. This legislation provides the profession of osteopathy with the same legal framework of statutory self-regulation as other healthcare professions, such as medicine and dentistry. The Act provides for "protection of title": a person who expressly or implicitly describes themself as an osteopath, osteopathic practitioner, osteopathic physician, osteopathist, osteotherapist, or any kind of osteopath, is guilty of an offence unless registered as an osteopath.

The General Osteopathic Council (GOsC) regulates the practice of osteopathy under the terms of the Act. Under British law, an osteopath must be registered with the GOsC to practice in the United Kingdom. More than 5,300 osteopaths were registered in the UK as of 2021. The GOsC has a statutory duty to promote, develop and regulate the profession of osteopathy in the UK and to protect the interests of the public by ensuring that all osteopaths maintain high standards of safety, competence and professional conduct throughout their professional lives. In order to be registered, an osteopath must hold a recognized qualification that meets the standards as set out by law in the GOsC's Osteopathic Practice Standards.

Practising osteopaths will usually have a BS or MSc in osteopathy. Accelerated courses leading to accreditation are available for those with a medical degree and physiotherapists. The London College of Osteopathic Medicine teaches osteopathy only to those who are already physicians.

=== United States ===
An osteopathic physician in the United States is a physician trained in the full scope of medical practice, with a degree of Doctor of Osteopathic Medicine (DO). With the increased internationalization of osteopathy, the American Osteopathic Association (AOA) recommended in 2010 that the older terms osteopathy and osteopath be reserved for "informal or historical discussions and for referring to previously named entities in the profession and foreign-trained osteopaths", and replaced in the US by osteopathic medicine and osteopathic physician. The American Association of Colleges of Osteopathic Medicine made a similar recommendation.

Those trained only in manual osteopathic treatment, generally to relieve muscular and skeletal conditions, are referred to as osteopaths, and are not permitted to use the title DO in the United States to avoid confusion with osteopathic physicians.

== See also ==
- Doctor of Osteopathic Medicine
- List of medical schools in the United States
- List of osteopathic colleges
- Osteopathic medicine in the United States
- Spinal manipulation
