= Osteopathic medicine in the United States =

Branch of the medical profession

Osteopathic medicine is a branch of the medical profession in the United States that promotes the practice of science-based medicine along with a philosophy and set of principles set by its earlier form, osteopathy. Osteopathic physicians (DOs) are graduates of American osteopathic medical colleges. They are licensed to practice the full scope of medicine and surgery in all 50 U.S. states. The field is distinct from osteopathic practices offered in nations outside of the U.S., whose practitioners are generally considered neither part of the core medical staff nor of medicine itself; rather, they are considered alternative medicine practitioners. Osteopathic physicians sometimes refer to the other major branch of medicine as allopathic medicine.

By the middle of the 20th century, the profession had moved closer to mainstream medicine. American "osteopaths" became "osteopathic medical doctors", ultimately achieving full practice rights as medical doctors in all 50 states.

In modern medicine in the U.S., any distinction between the MD and the DO professions has eroded steadily. The training of osteopathic physicians in the United States is now virtually indistinguishable from the training of allopathic physicians (MDs). The most notable difference in their training is that DOs spend an additional 300-500 hours studying pseudoscientific hands on musculoskeletal manipulation techniques. Osteopathic physicians attend four years of medical school like their MD counterparts, acquiring equivalent education in medicine and surgery; DOs also attend the same graduate medical education programs (ACGME-accredited residencies and fellowships) as their MD counterparts to acquire their licenses as physicians. DOs use all conventional methods of diagnosis and treatment and practice across all specialties of medicine and surgery. Although osteopathic physicians are still trained in osteopathic manipulative treatment (OMT), the modern derivative of Andrew Taylor Still's techniques, during medical school, the majority of practicing physicians with a DO degree do not practice OMT in their daily work. There are ongoing debates about the utility of maintaining separate, distinct pathways for educating physicians in the United States.

== Nomenclature ==
Physicians and surgeons who graduate from osteopathic medical schools are known as osteopathic physicians or osteopathic medical doctors. Upon graduation, they are conferred a Doctor of Osteopathic Medicine (DO) medical degree.

Osteopathic curricula in the United States differ from those in other countries. European-trained practitioners of osteopathic manipulative techniques are referred to as "osteopaths": their scope of practice excludes most medical therapies, relying instead on osteopathic manipulative medicine and alternative medical modalities. While it was once common for DO graduates in the United States to refer to themselves as "osteopaths", this term is now considered archaic. Those holding the DO degree are commonly referred to as "osteopathic physicians", and they learn, train in, and practice the full scope of mainstream evidence-based medicine and surgery.

== Demographics ==
Physicians entering US workforce by education, 2005

As of 2023, 40 medical schools were offering DO degrees in 64 locations across the United States, while there were 155 accredited MD medical schools (2021–2022).

- In 1960, 13,708 physicians were graduates of the 5 osteopathic medical schools.
- In 2002, there were 49,210 physicians from 19 osteopathic medical schools.
- Between 1980 and 2005, the number of osteopathic graduates per year increased by over 150 percent, from about 1,000 to 2,800. This number was expected to approach 5,000 by 2015.
- In 2016, there were 33 colleges of osteopathic medicine in 48 locations, in 31 states. One in four medical students in the United States in 2016 was enrolled in an osteopathic medical school.
- As of 2018, there were more than 145,000 osteopathic physicians and osteopathic medical students in the United States.

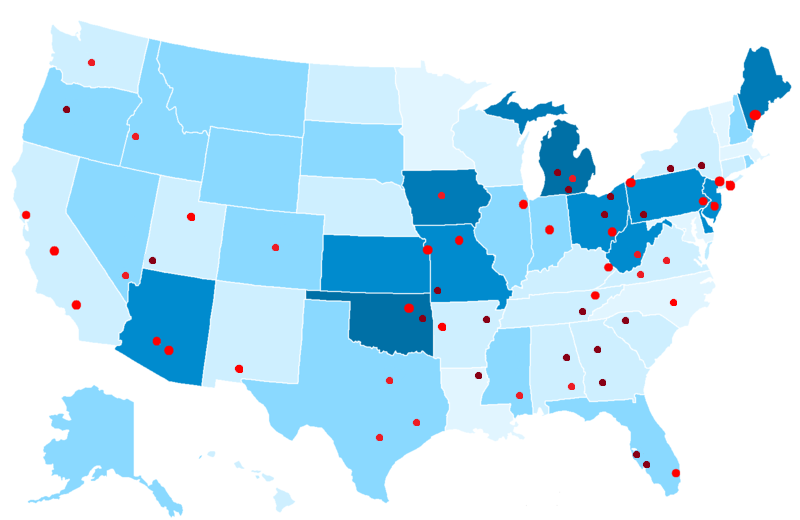
Geographic distribution of osteopathic physicians as a percentage of all physicians, by the state. Locations of osteopathic medical schools are in red. <3% 3–5% 5–10% 10–15% 15–25%

Osteopathic physicians are not evenly distributed in the United States. States with the highest concentration of osteopathic physicians are Oklahoma, Iowa, and Michigan, where osteopathic physicians comprised 17–20% of the physician workforce in 2011. The state with the greatest number of osteopathic physicians is Pennsylvania, with 8,536 DOs in active practice in 2018. The states with the lowest concentrations of DOs are Washington, D.C., North Dakota, and Vermont, where only 1–3% of physicians have an osteopathic medical degree. Public awareness of osteopathic medicine likewise varies widely in different regions. In 2003, people living in Midwest states were the most likely to be familiar with osteopathic medicine. In the Northeastern United States, osteopathic physicians provided more than one-third of general and family medicine patient visits between 2003 and 2004.

Between 2010 and 2015, twelve states experienced greater than 50% growth in the number of DOs: Virginia, South Carolina, Utah, Tennessee, North Dakota, Kentucky, South Dakota, Wyoming, Oregon, North Carolina, Minnesota, and Washington.

== Osteopathic principles ==
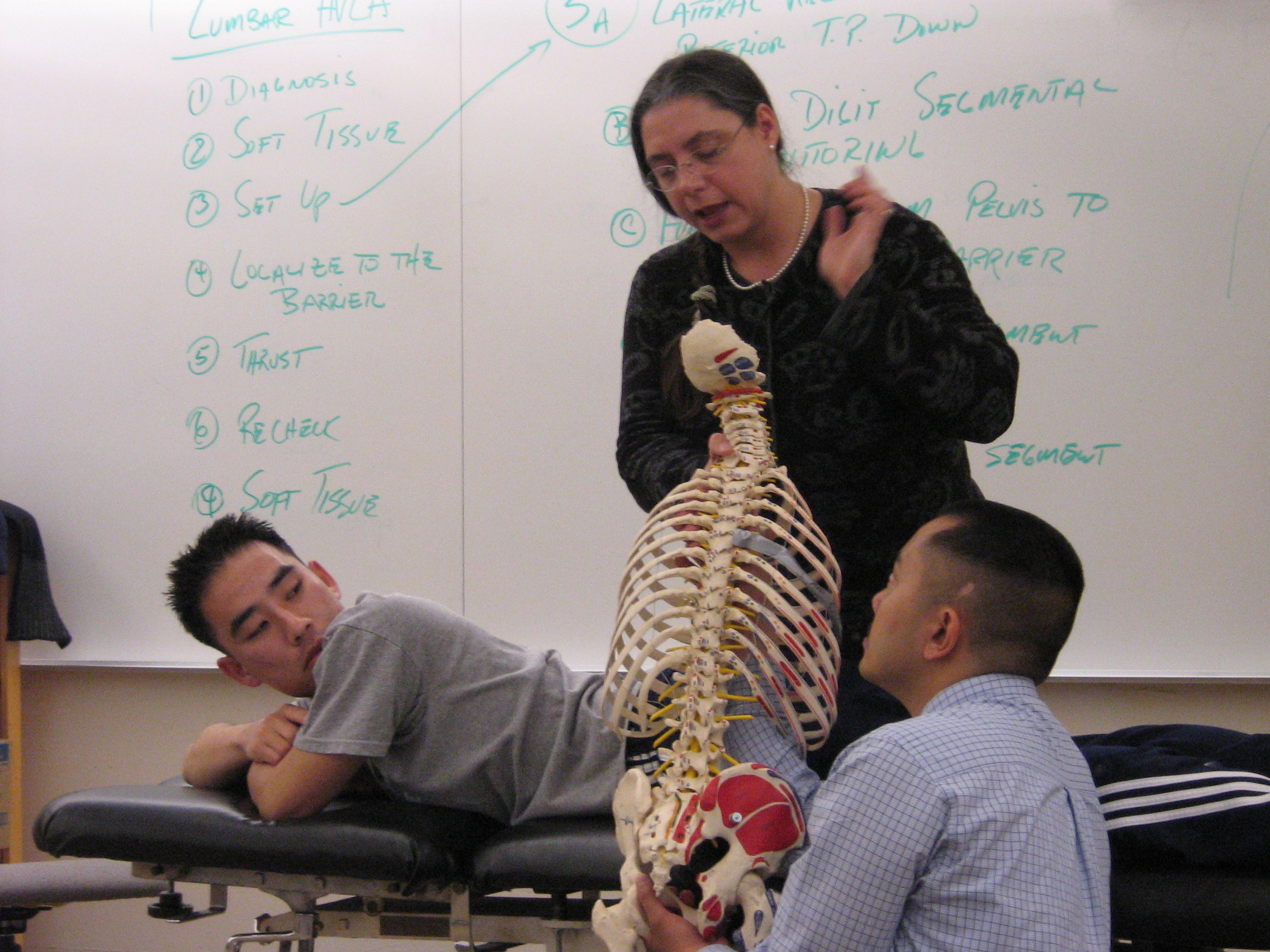
A physician demonstrates an OMT technique to medical students at an osteopathic medical school.

Osteopathic medical students take the Osteopathic Oath, similar to the Hippocratic oath, to maintain and uphold the "core principles" of osteopathic medical philosophy. Revised in 1953 and again in 2002, the core principles are:

1. The body is a unit; a person is a unit of body, mind, and spirit.
2. The body is capable of self-regulation, self-healing, and health maintenance.
3. Structure and function are reciprocally interrelated.
4. Rational treatment is based on an understanding of these principles: body unity, self-regulation, and the interrelationship of structure and function.

Contemporary osteopathic physicians practice evidence-based medicine, indistinguishable from their MD colleagues.

=== Significance ===
There are different opinions on the significance of these principles. Some note that the osteopathic medical philosophy is suggestive of a kind of social movement within the field of medicine, one that promotes a more patient-centered, holistic approach to medicine, and emphasizes the role of the primary care physician within the health care system. Others point out that there is nothing in the principles that would distinguish DO from MD training in any fundamental way. One study, published in The Journal of the American Osteopathic Association, found that a majority of MD medical school administrators and faculty saw nothing objectionable in the core principles listed above, and some endorsed them generally as broad medical principles.

== History ==
=== 19th century, a new movement within medicine ===
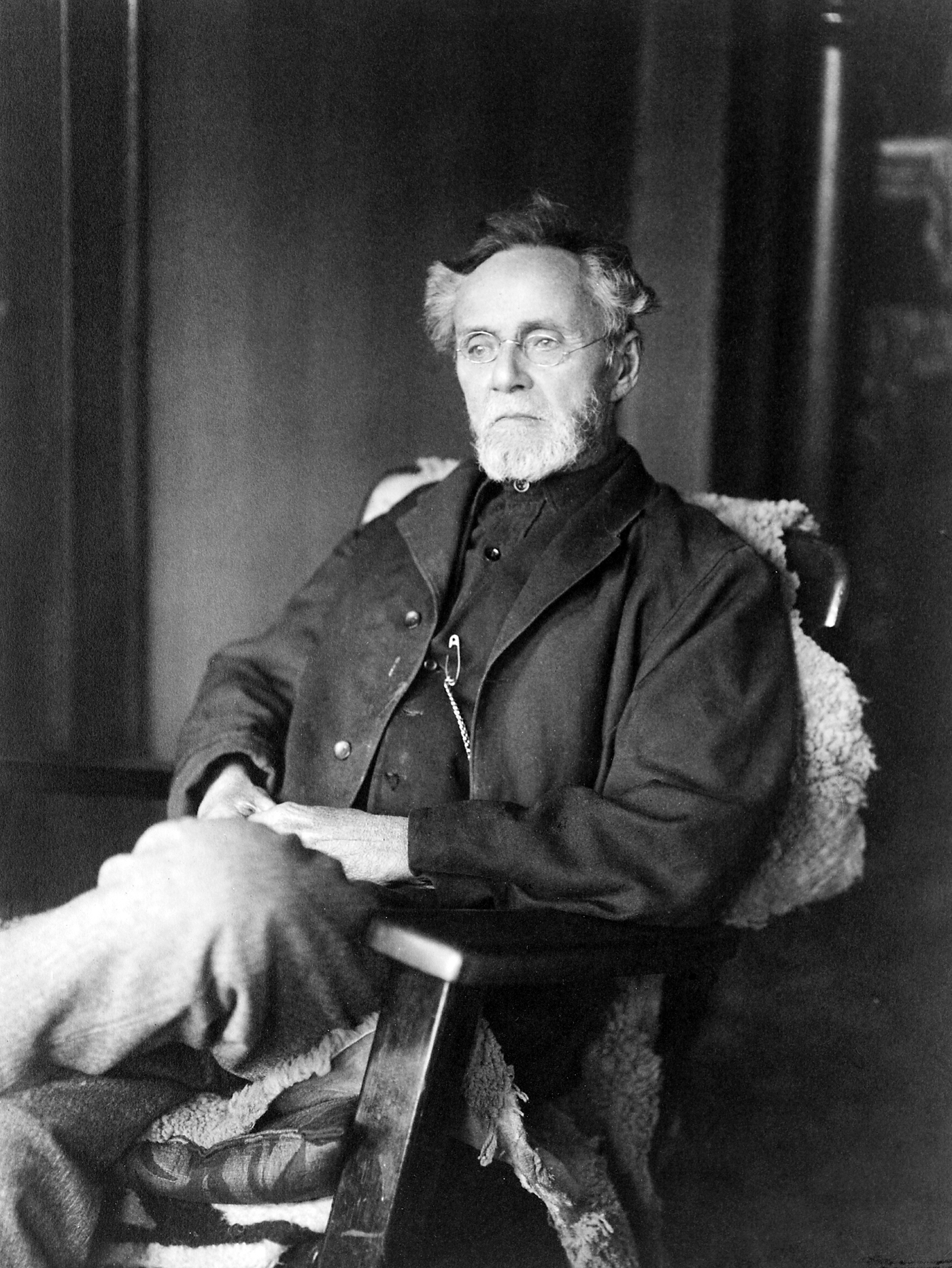
Andrew Taylor Still, founder of osteopathic medicine

Frontier physician Andrew Taylor Still, MD founded the American School of Osteopathy (now the A.T. Still University-Kirksville (Mo.) College of Osteopathic Medicine) in Kirksville, Missouri in 1892 as a radical protest against the turn-of-the-century medical system. A.T. Still believed that the conventional medical system lacked credible efficacy, was morally corrupt, and treated effects rather than causes of disease. He founded osteopathic medicine in rural Missouri at a time when medications, surgery, and other traditional therapeutic regimens often caused more harm than good. Some of the medicines commonly given to patients during this time were arsenic, castor oil, whiskey, and opium. In addition, unsanitary surgical practices often resulted in more deaths than cures.

Still intended his new system of medicine to be a reformation of the existing 19th-century medical practices. He imagined that someday "rational medical therapy" would consist of the manipulation of the musculoskeletal system, surgery, and very sparingly used drugs. He invented the name "osteopathy" by blending two Greek roots osteon- for bone and -pathos for suffering, to communicate his theory that disease and physiologic dysfunction were etiologically grounded in a disordered musculoskeletal system. Thus, by diagnosing and treating the musculoskeletal system, he believed that physicians could treat a variety of diseases and spare patients the negative side effects of drugs.

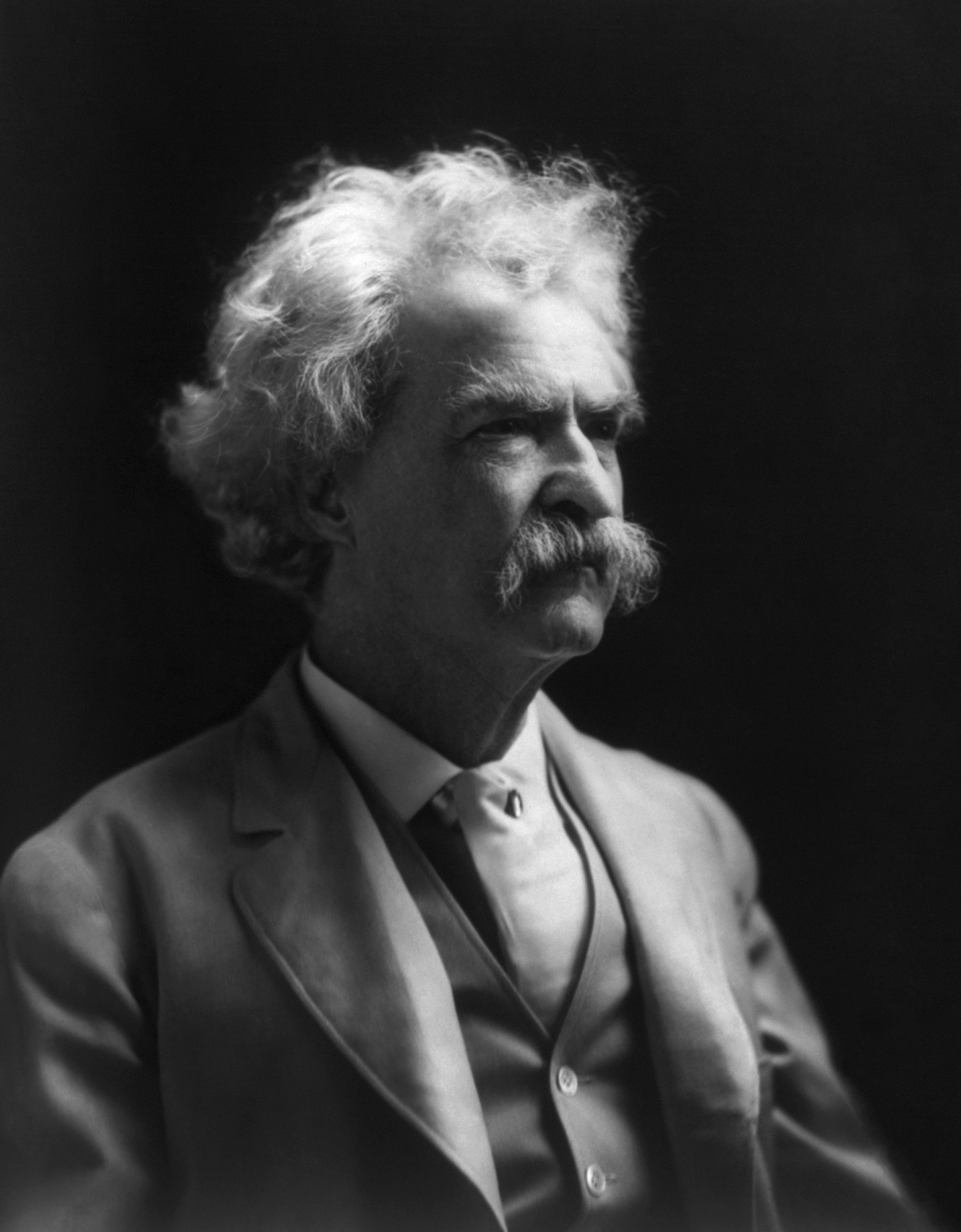
Mark Twain was a vocal supporter of the early osteopathic movement.

The new profession faced stiff opposition from the medical establishment at the time. The relationship of the osteopathic and medical professions was often "bitterly contentious" and involved "strong efforts" by medical organizations to discredit osteopathic medicine. Throughout the first half of the twentieth century, the policy of the American Medical Association labeled osteopathic medicine as a cult. The AMA Code of Ethics declared it unethical for a physician to associate with an osteopath voluntarily.

One notable advocate for the fledgling movement was Mark Twain. Manipulative treatments had purportedly alleviated the symptoms of his daughter Jean's epilepsy as well as Twain's own chronic bronchitis. In 1909, he spoke before the New York State Assembly at a hearing regarding the practice of osteopathy in the state. "I don't know as I cared much about these osteopaths until I heard you were going to drive them out of the state, but since I heard that, I haven't been able to sleep." Philosophically opposed to the American Medical Association's stance that its own type of medical practice was the only legitimate one, he spoke in favor of licensing for osteopaths. Physicians from the New York County Medical Society responded with a vigorous attack on Twain, who retorted with "[t]he physicians think they are moved by regard for the best interests of the public. Isn't there a little touch of self-interest back of it all?" "... The objection is, people are curing people without a license, and you are afraid it will bust up business."

Following an accreditation survey in 1903, the American Osteopathic Association began requiring 3-year curricula at osteopathic medical schools. In 1916, the AOA mandated that all DO schools expand programs to four years. In 1929, osteopathic medical schools began teaching pharmacology as a part of the curriculum.

=== 1916–1966, federal recognition ===
Evolution of osteopathic medicine's mission and identity
| Years | Identity & Mission |
| 1892 to 1950 | Manual medicine |
| 1951 to 1970 | Family practice / manual therapy |
| 1971 to present | Full service care / multispeciality orientation |

Recognition by the US federal government was a key goal of the osteopathic medical profession in its effort to establish equivalency with its MD counterparts. Between 1916 and 1966, the profession engaged in a "long and tortuous struggle" for the right to serve as physicians and surgeons in the US Military Medical Corps. On May 3, 1966, Secretary of Defense Robert McNamara authorized the acceptance of osteopathic physicians into all the medical military services on the same basis as MDs. The first osteopathic physician to take the oath of office to serve as a military physician was Harry J. Walter. The acceptance of osteopathic physicians was further solidified in 1996 when Ronald Blanck, DO was appointed to serve as Surgeon General of the Army, the only osteopathic physician to hold the post.

=== 1962, California ===
In the 1960s in California, the American Medical Association (AMA) spent nearly $8 million to end the practice of osteopathic medicine in the state. In 1962, Proposition 22, a statewide ballot initiative in California, eliminated the practice of osteopathic medicine in the state. The California Medical Association (CMA) issued MD degrees to all DOs in the state of California for a nominal fee. "By attending a short seminar and paying $65, a doctor of osteopathy (DO) could obtain an MD degree; 86 percent of the DOs in the state (out of a total of about 2000) chose to do so." Immediately following, the AMA re-accredited the University of California at Irvine College of Osteopathic Medicine as the University of California, Irvine School of Medicine, an MD medical school. It also placed a ban on issuing physician licenses to DOs moving to California from other states. However, the decision proved to be controversial. In 1974, after protests and lobbying by influential and prominent DOs, the California Supreme Court ruled in Osteopathic Physicians and Surgeons of California v. California Medical Association that licensing of DOs in that state must be resumed. Four years later, in 1978, the College of Osteopathic Medicine of the Pacific opened in Pomona, and in 1997, Touro University California opened in Vallejo. As of 2012, 6,368 DOs were practicing in California.

=== 1969, AMA House of Delegates approval ===
Total number of DOs in residency programs, by year: DO residents in ACGME (MD) programs DO residents in AOA (DO) programs.

In 1969, the American Medical Association (AMA) approved a measure allowing qualified osteopathic physicians to be full and active members of the Association. The measure also allowed osteopathic physicians to participate in AMA-approved intern and residency programs. However, the American Osteopathic Association rejected this measure, claiming it was an attempt to eliminate the distinctiveness of osteopathic medicine. In 1970, AMA President Dwight L. Wilbur sponsored a measure in the AMA's House of Delegates permitting the AMA Board of Trustees' plan for the merger of the DO and MD professions. Today, a majority of osteopathic physicians are trained alongside MDs, in residency programs governed by the ACGME, an independent board of the AMA.

=== 1993, first African-American woman to serve as dean of a US medical school ===
In 1993, Barbara Ross-Lee, DO, was appointed as the dean of the Ohio University College of Osteopathic Medicine; she was the first African-American woman to serve as the dean of a US medical school. Ross-Lee is the sister of singer Diana Ross.

=== Non-discrimination policies ===
Recent years have seen a professional rapprochement between the two groups. DOs have been admitted to full active membership in the American Medical Association since 1969. The AMA has invited a representative of the American Osteopathic Association to sit as a voting member in the AMA legislative body, the House of Delegates.

==== 2006, American Medical Student Association ====
In 2006, during the presidency of an osteopathic medical student, the American Medical Student Association (AMSA) adopted a policy regarding the membership rights of osteopathic medical students in their main policy document, the "Preamble, Purposes and Principles."

AMSA RECOGNIZES the equality of osteopathic and allopathic medical degrees within the organization and the healthcare community as a whole. As such, DO students shall be entitled to the same opportunities and membership rights as allopathic students.

— PPP, AMSA

==== 2007, AMA ====
In recent years, the largest MD organization in the US, the American Medical Association, adopted a fee non-discrimination policy discouraging differential pricing based on attending an MD or DO medical school.

In 2006, calls for an investigation into the existence of differential fees charged for visiting DO and MD medical students at American medical schools were brought to the American Medical Association. After an internal investigation into the fee structure for visiting DO and MD medical students at MD medical schools, it was found that one institution of the 102 surveyed charged different fees for DO and MD students. The house of delegates of the American Medical Association adopted resolution 809, I-05 in 2007.

Our AMA, in collaboration with the American Osteopathic Association, discourages discrimination against medical students by institutions and programs based on osteopathic or allopathic training.

— AMA policy H-295.876

=== State licensing of practice rights ===
Years in which states passed laws granting DOs medical practice rights equal to MDs: 1901–1930 1931–1966 1967–1989

In the United States, laws regulating physician licenses are governed by the states. Between 1896 and 1973, osteopathic physicians lobbied state legislatures to pass laws giving those with a DO degree the same legal privilege to practice medicine as those with an MD degree. In many states, the debate was protracted. Both the AOA and the AMA were heavily involved in influencing the legislative process. The first state to pass such a law was Vermont in 1896; the last was Mississippi in 1973.

== Current status ==
=== Education and training ===
According to Harrison's Principles of Internal Medicine, "the training, practice, credentialing, licensure, and reimbursement of osteopathic physicians is virtually indistinguishable from those of (MD) physicians, with 4 years of osteopathic medical school followed by specialty and subspecialty training and [board] certification."

DO-granting US medical schools have curricula similar to those of MD-granting schools. Generally, the first two years are classroom-based, while the third and fourth years consist of clinical rotations through the major specialties of medicine. Some schools of Osteopathic Medicine have been criticized by the osteopathic community for relying too heavily on clinical rotations with private practitioners, who may not be able to provide sufficient instruction to the rotating student. Other DO-granting and MD-granting schools place their students in hospital-based clinical rotations where the attending physicians are faculty of the school, and who have a clear duty to teach medical students while treating patients.

==== Graduate medical education ====
Sources of the 24,012 medical school graduates entering US physician training programs in 2004

Upon graduation, most osteopathic medical physicians pursue residency training programs. Depending on state licensing laws, osteopathic medical physicians may also complete a one-year rotating internship at a hospital approved by the American Osteopathic Association (AOA). Osteopathic physicians may apply to residency programs accredited by the Accreditation Council for Graduate Medical Education (ACGME). The AOA ceased graduate medical education accreditation activities in 2020.

== Osteopathic manipulative treatment (OMT) ==
Within the osteopathic medical curriculum, manipulative treatment is taught as an adjunctive measure to other biomedical interventions for several disorders and diseases. However, a 2001 survey of osteopathic physicians found that more than 50% of the respondents used OMT on less than 5% of their patients. The survey follows many indicators that osteopathic physicians have become more like MD physicians in every respect —few perform OMT, and most prescribe medications or suggest surgery as the first line of treatment. The American Osteopathic Association has made an effort in recent years to support scientific inquiry into the effectiveness of osteopathic manipulation and to encourage osteopathic physicians to offer manipulative treatments to their patients consistently. However, the number of osteopathic physicians who report consistently prescribing and performing manipulative treatment has been falling steadily. Medical historian and sociologist Norman Gevitz cites poor educational quarters and few full-time OMT instructors as major factors for the decreasing interest of medical students in OMT. He describes problems with "the quality, breadth, nature, and orientation of OMM instruction," and he claims that the teaching of osteopathic medicine has not changed sufficiently over the years to meet the intellectual and practical needs of students.

In their assigned readings, students learn what certain prominent DOs have to say about various somatic dysfunctions. There is often a theory or model presented that provides conjectures and putative explanations about why somatic dysfunction exists and what its significance is. Instructors spend the bulk of their time demonstrating osteopathic manipulative (OM) techniques without providing evidence that the techniques are significant and efficacious. Even worse, faculty members rarely provide instrument-based objective evidence that somatic dysfunction is present in the first place.

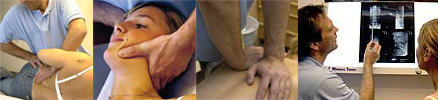
Osteopathic manipulative treatment (OMT) involves palpation and manipulation of bones, muscles, joints, and fasciae.

At the same time, recent studies show an increasingly positive attitude of patients and physicians (MD and DO) toward the use of manual therapy as a valid, safe, and effective treatment modality. One survey, published in the Journal of Continuing Medical Education, found that a majority of physicians (81%) and patients (76%) felt that manual manipulation (MM) was safe, and over half (56% of physicians and 59% of patients) felt that manipulation should be available in the primary care setting. Although less than half (40%) of the physicians reported any educational exposure to MM and less than one-quarter (20%) have administered MM in their practice, most (71%) respondents endorsed desiring more instruction in MM. Another small study examined the interest and ability of MD residents in learning osteopathic principles and skills, including OMT. It showed that after a 1-month elective rotation, the MD residents responded favorably to the experience.

=== Professional attitudes ===
In 1998, an article in The New York Times described the increasing numbers, public awareness, and mainstreaming of osteopathic medical physicians, illustrating an increasingly cooperative climate between the DO and MD professions.

In 2005, during his tenure as president of the Association of American Medical Colleges, Jordan Cohen described a climate of cooperation between DO and MD practitioners:

"We now find ourselves living at a time when osteopathic and allopathic graduates are both sought after by many of the same residency programs; are in most instances both licensed by the same licensing boards; are both privileged by many of the same hospitals; and are found in appreciable numbers on the faculties of each other's medical schools".

=== International practice rights ===
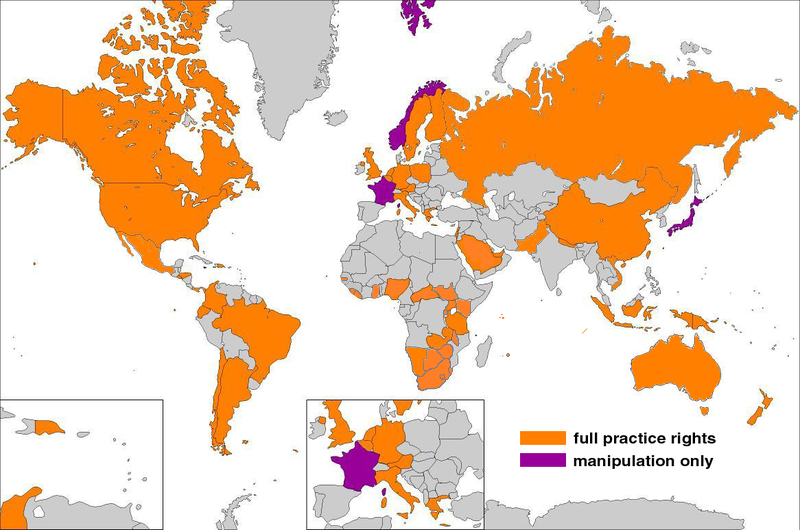
International practice rights of US trained DOs

Each country has different requirements and procedures for licensing or registering osteopathic physicians and osteopaths. The only osteopathic practitioners that the US Department of Education recognizes as physicians are graduates of osteopathic medical colleges in the United States.

The Bureau on International Osteopathic Medical Education and Affairs (BIOMEA) is an independent board of the American Osteopathic Association. The BIOMEA monitors the licensing and registration practices of physicians in countries outside of the United States and advances the recognition of American-trained DOs. Towards this end, the BIOMEA works with international health organizations like the World Health Organization (WHO), the Pan American Health Organization (PAHO), as well as other groups.

The procedure by which countries consider granting physician licensure to foreigners varies widely. For US-trained physicians, the ability to qualify for "unlimited practice rights" also varies according to one's degree, MD or DO. Many countries recognize US-trained MDs as applicants for licensure, granting successful applicants "unlimited" practice rights. The American Osteopathic Association has lobbied the governments of other countries to recognize US-trained DOs similarly to their MD counterparts, with some success.

Osteopathic Medicine and Osteopathy
Osteopathy in Australia and New Zealand
Osteopathic medicine in Canada
Osteopathy in Europe Osteopathy in the UK
Osteopathic medicine in the United States

According to Josh Kerr of the AOA, "some countries don't understand the differences in training between an osteopathic physician and an osteopath." The American Medical Student Association strongly advocates for US-trained DO international practice rights "equal to that" of MD-qualified physicians.

The International Labor Organization (ILO), an agency of the United Nations, issued a letter affirming that U.S.-trained osteopathic physicians are fully licensed physicians who prescribe medication and perform surgery. The acknowledgment draws a clear separation between American DOs, who are medical doctors, and non-physician osteopaths trained outside of the United States. Within the international standards that classify jobs to promote international comparability across occupations, U.S.-trained DOs are now categorized with all other physicians as medical doctors. This event took place in June 2018 and started a relay of events and opened doors for DO's as more countries started to understand and give full recognition to US-trained medical doctors with the D.O. degree, e.g. the Association of Medical Councils of Africa (AMCOA) approved a resolution in 2019 granting the AOA's request that AMCOA recognizes U.S.-trained DOs as fully licensed physicians with practice rights equivalent to MDs, opening its 20 member countries, which include Botswana, Gambia, Ghana, Kenya, Lesotho, Liberia, Malawi, Mauritius, Namibia, Nigeria, Rwanda, Seychelles, Sierra Leone, South Africa, South Sudan, Swaziland, Tanzania, Uganda, Zambia, and Zimbabwe to DO's.

=== In primary care ===
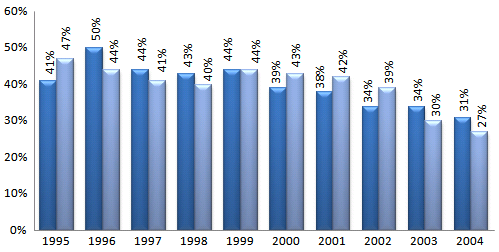
Trends in primary care as a career choice of osteopathic medical students 4th year students 1st year students

Osteopathic physicians have historically entered primary care fields at a higher rate than their MD counterparts. Some osteopathic organizations claim they emphasize the importance of primary care within osteopathic medicine more strongly. However, the proportion of osteopathic students choosing primary care fields, like that of their MD peers, is declining. Currently, only one in five osteopathic medical students enters a family medicine residency (the largest primary care field). In 2004, only 32% of osteopathic seniors planned careers in any primary care field; this percentage was down from a peak in 1996 of more than 50%.

== Criticism and internal debate ==
=== OMT ===
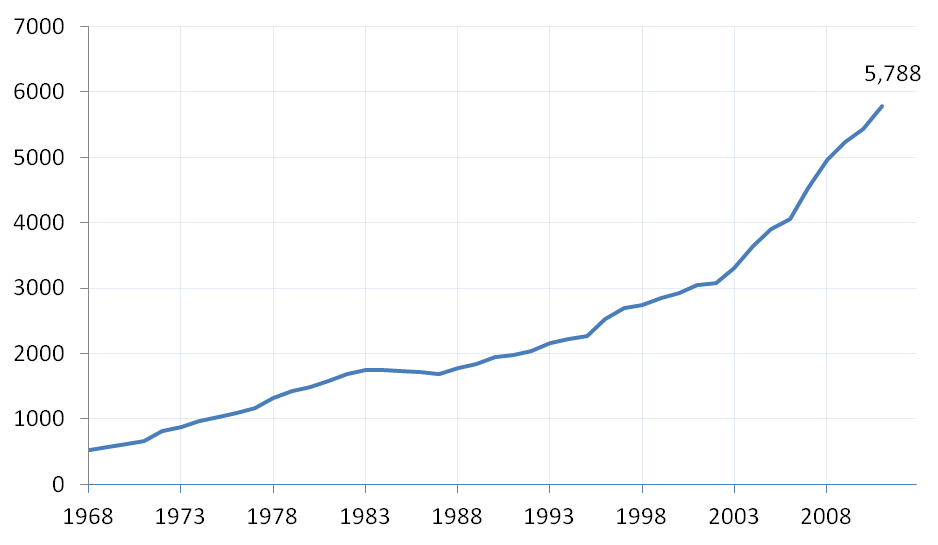
First-year enrollment at osteopathic medical schools, 1968–2011

Traditional osteopathic medicine, specifically OMT, has been criticized for using techniques such as cranial and cranio-sacral manipulation (or craniosacral therapy, CST). CST has been described as pseudoscience, which lacks supporting scientific evidence. Medical research has found no good evidence that either CST or cranial osteopathy confers any health benefit, and they can be harmful, particularly if used on children or infants. The basic assumptions of CST are challenged by some medical doctors, and practitioners produce conflicting and mutually exclusive diagnoses of the same patients.

=== Research emphasis ===
Another area of criticism has been the relative lack of research and lesser emphasis on scientific inquiry at DO schools compared with MD schools.

The inability to institutionalize research, particularly clinical research, at osteopathic institutions has, over the years, weakened the acculturation, socialization, and distinctive beliefs and practices of osteopathic students and graduates.

=== Identity crisis ===
A debate exists within the osteopathic community over the feasibility of maintaining osteopathic medicine as a distinct entity within US health care. J. D. Howell, author of The Paradox of Osteopathy, notes claims of a "fundamental yet ineffable difference" between MD and DO qualified physicians are based on practices such as "preventive medicine and seeing patients in a sociological context" that are "widely encountered not only in osteopathic medicine but also in allopathic medicine." Studies have confirmed the lack of any "philosophic concept or resultant practice behavior" that would distinguish a DO from an MD. Howell summarizes the questions framing the debate over the future of osteopathic distinctiveness thus:

If osteopathy has become the functional equivalent of allopathy [meaning the MD profession], what is the justification for its continued existence? And if there is value in therapy that is uniquely osteopathic, why should its use be limited to osteopaths?

==== Rapid expansion ====
As the number of osteopathic schools has increased, the debate over distinctiveness has often left the leadership of the American Osteopathic Association at odds with the osteopathic physician community.

Within the osteopathic community, the growth is drawing attention to the identity crisis faced by [the profession]. While osteopathic leaders emphasize osteopaths' unique identity, many osteopaths would rather not draw attention to their uniqueness.

The rapid expansion has raised concerns about the number of available faculty at osteopathic schools and the role those faculty play in maintaining the integrity of academic programs. Norman Gevitz, author of the leading text on the history of osteopathic medicine, wrote in 2009,

DO schools are currently expanding their class sizes much more quickly than are their MD counterparts. Unlike MD colleges, where it is widely known that academic faculty members—fearing dilution of quality as well as the prospect of an increased teaching workload—constitute a powerful inhibiting force to expand the class size, osteopathic faculty at private osteopathic schools have traditionally had little or no input on such matters. Instead, these decisions are almost exclusively the responsibility of college administrators and their boards of trustees, who look at such expansion from an entrepreneurial as well as an educational perspective. Osteopathic medical schools can keep the cost of student body expansion relatively low compared with that of MD institutions. Although the standards of the Commission on Osteopathic College Accreditation ensure that there will be enough desks and lab spaces to accommodate all new students, they do not mandate that an osteopathic college must bear the expense of maintaining a high full-time faculty: student ratio.

The president of the American Association of Colleges of Osteopathic Medicine commented on the current climate of crisis within the profession.

The simultaneous movement away from osteopathic medicine's traditionally separate training and practice systems, when coupled with its rapid growth, has created a sense of crisis as to its future. The rapid rate of growth has raised questions as to the availability of clinical and basic science faculty and clinical resources to accommodate the increasing load of students.

== See also ==
- Comparison of MD and DO in the United States
- Doctor of Osteopathic Medicine
- List of osteopathic colleges
- Osteopathic medical schools in the United States
- Osteopathic medical associations in the United States
- Osteopathy
