= Comparison of MD and DO in the United States =

Differences in U.S. medical practices

Most physicians in the United States hold either the Doctor of Medicine degree (MD) or the Doctor of Osteopathic Medicine degree (DO). Institutions awarding the MD are accredited by the Liaison Committee on Medical Education (LCME). Institutions awarding the DO are accredited by the Commission on Osteopathic College Accreditation (COCA). The World Directory of Medical Schools lists both LCME-accredited MD programs and COCA-accredited DO programs as "US medical schools". Non-US-trained osteopaths do not hold DO degrees, nor are they recognized as physicians.

The curriculum and coursework at MD- and DO-granting schools is virtually indistinguishable other than the addition of osteopathic manipulative medicine (OMM), which is taught at DO-granting schools only. One OMM practice, cranial therapy, has received criticism regarding its efficacy and therapeutic value.

Both MD and DO degree holders must complete Graduate Medical Education (GME) via residency and optional fellowship in any medical specialty of choice after medical school in order to practice medicine and surgery in the United States. Since 2020, all DO and MD graduates complete GME training at a program approved by the Accreditation Council for Graduate Medical Education (ACGME). Before 2020, practicing physicians holding the DO could have completed GME training at a program approved by either the American Osteopathic Association (AOA) or ACGME. Historically AOA-approved GME programs either gained approval by the ACGME or were dissolved with the 2020 merger between the AOA and the ACGME.

Physicians who bear an MD or DO can be licensed to practice medicine and surgery in all states. The history of the MD and DO degrees differ significantly.

== History and background ==
While MD schools have followed the development of society, osteopathic medicine is a more recent development. The first MD school in the United States opened in New York in 1754 (King’s College, current Columbia University), and the first M.D. degree was awarded there in 1770. In 1847, the American Medical Association was formed, and standards were put into place, with a three-year program including lectures, dissection, and hospital experience. In 1892, frontier physician Andrew Taylor Still founded the American School of Osteopathy (now A.T. Still University) in Kirksville, Missouri, as a protest against the present medical system. Still believed that the conventional medical system lacked credible efficacy, was morally corrupt, and treated effects rather than causes of disease. Throughout the 1900s, DOs gained practice rights and government recognition. The first state to pass regulations allowing DOs medical practice rights was California in 1901, the last was Nebraska in 1989. Up through the 1960s, osteopathic medicine was labeled a cult by the American Medical Association, and collaboration by physicians with osteopathic practitioners was considered to be unethical.

The American Medical Association's current definition of a physician is "an individual who has received a 'Doctor of Medicine' or a 'Doctor of Osteopathic Medicine' degree or an equivalent degree following successful completion of a prescribed course of study from a school of medicine or osteopathic medicine."

In a 2005 editorial about mitigating the impending shortage of physicians in the United States, Jordan Cohen, MD, then-president of the Association of American Medical Colleges (AAMC) stated:

After more than a century of often bitterly contentious relationships between the osteopathic and allopathic medical professions, we now find ourselves living at a time when osteopathic and allopathic graduates are both sought after by many of the same residency programs; are in most instances both licensed by the same licensing boards; are both privileged by many of the same hospitals; and are found in appreciable numbers on the faculties of each other's medical schools.

== Demographics ==
=== Medical training ===
Of the 989,320 physicians actively practicing in the United States as of December 31, 2022, 66% hold an MD degree granted in the U.S., 26% are international medical graduates (IMG), and 8% hold a DO degree. The percentage of physicians that hold a DO degree varies by specialty, with the greatest representation in Family Medicine/General Practice (16.5% of general practitioners), Physical Medicine & Rehabilitation (13.8%), and Emergency Medicine (11.2%) [2016 data]. IMG physicians are more likely to enter primary care specialties than US MD physicians. As of 2007, IMG physicians represented 36% of internal medicine physicians, 29% of anesthesiologists, 31.4% of psychiatrists, 28% of pediatricians, 17.8% of family physicians, 17.8% of OB/GYNs, 18.8% of radiologists and 20% of general surgeons.

As of 2015, 9.0% of residents and fellows in medical training programs accredited by the Accreditation Council for Graduate Medical Education (ACGME), which accredits all residency programs, hold a DO degree. 65.1% of the 19,302 DO graduates enrolled in post-doctoral training are in ACGME-accredited programs, with the remainder in AOA programs. Since 2020, the ACGME accredits all residency programs in the United States for both MDs and DOs.

=== Trends ===
There are significantly more MDs than DOs. However, the number of DOs is increasing at a faster rate than the number of MDs. A 2012 survey of students applying to both U.S. MD and DO schools found that 9% of applicants were admitted only to an MD school, 46% were admitted only to a DO school, 26% were admitted to both, and 19% were not admitted to any medical schools. Geographic location was the top reason given by both DO and MD students for choosing the school in which they enrolled. Of first-year medical students matriculating in 2016, 25.9% (7,369 students) entered US-DO schools and 74.1% (21,030 students) entered US-MD schools. The Association of American Medical Colleges projected that from 2016 to 2021, first-year DO student enrollment would increase by 19.4% versus a 5.7% increase in MD students. Between 1980 and 2005, the annual number of new MDs remained stable at around 16,000. During the same period, the number of new DOs increased by more than 150% (from about 1,000 to about 2,800). The number of new MDs per 100,000 people fell from 7.5 to 5.6, while the number of new DOs per 100,000 rose from 0.4 to 0.8.

=== Geographic distribution ===
The geographic distribution of MD and DO physicians is not uniform. As of 2012, the states with the greatest ratio of active physicians holding a DO degree versus active physicians holding an MD degree were Oklahoma (20.7% of physicians), Iowa, Michigan, Maine, and West Virginia. During that same year, the states with the greatest ratio of active physicians holding an MD degree versus a DO degree were Louisiana, D.C., Massachusetts, Maryland, and Connecticut. The states with the greatest per capita number of MD physicians are Washington, D.C., Massachusetts, Maryland, New York, and Connecticut.

The sex and racial distribution of DOs and MDs are similar.

== Research and scholarly activity ==
While the number of MD students and MD schools is significantly greater than the number of DO students and DO schools, MD schools have applied for and received 800 times more funding for scientific and clinical research from the National Institutes of Health than DO schools. In 2011, DO schools ranked last out of 17 types of educational institutions, including veterinary medicine, optometry, social work, and dentistry. In 2014, an article in the Journal of the American Osteopathic Association stated that research from osteopathic schools amounted to "fewer than 15 publications per year per school, and more than a quarter of these publications had never been cited."

About 16% of IMG MD physicians hold academic positions, whereas eighty percent practice medicine in community settings.

== Cultural differences ==
=== Patient interactions ===
Several studies have investigated whether there is a difference in the approach to patients by MDs and DOs. A study of patient visits to general and family medicine physicians in the U.S., including 277 million visits to MDs and 65 million visits to DOs, found that there was no significant difference between DOs and MDs with regard to time spent with patients and preventive medicine services.

The study of approximately 341 million healthcare visits founds that there was no difference on the rate that doctors provided to patients diet or nutrition counseling, weight-reduction counseling, exercise counseling, tobacco use or exposure counseling, and mental health or stress reduction counseling. Some authors describe subjective distinctions in patient interactions, but Avery Hurt writes, "In actual practice, the variations between the two types of physicians are often so slight as to be unnoticeable to patients, and a day in the life of each can appear indistinguishable. The differences are there—subtle, but deep."

=== Self-characterization and identification ===
A study published by the Journal of General Internal Medicine found significant differences in the attitudes of DOs and MDs. The study found that 40.1% of MD students and physicians described themselves as being "socioemotionally" oriented over "technoscientific" orientation. In comparison, 63.8% of their DO counterparts self-identified as being socioemotional.

One study of DOs attempted to investigate their perceptions of differences in philosophy and practice between themselves and their MD counterparts: "59 percent of the respondents believed they practiced differently from allopathic physicians, and 72 percent of the follow-up responses indicated that the osteopathic approach to treatment was a primary distinguishing feature, mainly incorporating the application of OMT, a caring doctor–patient relationship, and a hands-on style."

As the training of DOs and MDs became less distinct, some expressed concern that the unique characteristics of osteopathic medicine would be lost. Others welcomed the rapprochement and already considered modern medicine to be the type of medicine practiced by both "MD and DO type doctors". One persistent difference is the respective acceptance of the terms "allopathic" and "osteopathic." DO medical schools and organizations all include the word osteopathic in their names, and such groups actively promote an "osteopathic approach" to medicine. While "osteopathy" was a term used by its founder A.T. Still in the 19th century to describe his new philosophy of medicine, "allopathic medicine" was originally a derogatory term coined by Samuel Hahnemann to contrast the conventional medicine of his day with his alternative system of homeopathic medicine. Some authors argue that the terms "osteopathic" and "allopathic" should be dropped altogether, since their original meanings bear little relevance to the current practice of modern medicine.

== Medical education and training ==
=== Medical schools ===
The Liaison Committee on Medical Education (LCME) accredits the 144 U.S. medical schools that award the MD degree, while the American Osteopathic Association (AOA)'s Commission on Osteopathic College Accreditation (COCA) accredits the 38 osteopathic medical schools that award the DO degree. Osteopathic medical schools tend to be affiliated with smaller universities.

Michigan State University, Rowan University, and Nova Southeastern University offer both MD and DO accredited programs. In 2009, Kansas City University proposed starting a dual MD/DO program in addition to the existing DO program, and the University of North Texas explored the possibility of starting an MD program that would be offered alongside the DO program. Both proposals were met with controversy. Proponents argued that adding an MD program would lead to the creation of more local residency programs and improve the university's ability to acquire research funding and state funding, while opponents wanted to protect the discipline of osteopathy.

At least 61% of graduating seniors at osteopathic medical schools evaluated that over half of their required in-hospital training was delivered by MD physicians. Overall, osteopathic medical schools have more modest research programs compared to MD schools, and fewer DO schools are part of universities that own a hospital. Osteopathic medical schools tend to have a stronger focus on primary care medicine than MD schools. DO schools have developed various strategies to encourage their graduates to pursue primary care, such as offering accelerated three-year programs for primary care, focusing clinical education in community health centers, and selecting rural or under-served urban areas for the location of new campuses.

==== Osteopathic manipulative medicine ====
Many authors note the most obvious difference between the curricula of DO and MD schools is osteopathic manipulative medicine (OMM), a form of hands-on care used to diagnose, treat and prevent illness or injury and is taught only at DO schools. As of 2006, the average osteopathic medical student spent almost eight weeks on clerkships for OMM during their third and fourth years. The National Institute of Health's National Center for Complementary and Integrative Health states that overall, studies have shown that spinal manipulation can provide mild-to-moderate relief from low-back pain and appears to be as effective as conventional medical treatments. In 2007 guidelines, the American College of Physicians and the American Pain Society include spinal manipulation as one of several treatment options for practitioners to consider using when pain does not improve with self-care. Spinal manipulation is generally a safe treatment for low-back pain. Serious complications are very rare. A 2001 survey of DOs found that more than 50% of the respondents used OMT (osteopathic manipulative treatment) on less than 5% of their patients. The survey was the latest indication that DOs have become more like MD physicians in all respects: fewer perform OMT, more prescribe drugs, and many perform surgery as a first option. One area which has been implicated, but not been formally studied regarding the decline in OMT usage among DOs in practice, is the role of reimbursement changes. Only in the last several years could a DO charge for both an office visit (Evaluation & Management services) and use a procedure (CPT) code when performing OMT; previously, it was bundled.

==== Student aptitude indicators ====
The use of standardized exams as indicators of performance or aptitude has been debated. However, while less than the difference between other factors such as race (which may affect MCAT scores by 9 points or more), there is a statistical difference of about 5 points on average MCAT scores of those who matriculate at DO schools versus those who matriculate at MD schools. There is also a difference of 0.16 GPA between MD and DO matriculants. In 2016, the average MCAT and GPA for students entering U.S.-based MD programs were 508.7 and 3.70, respectively, and 503.8 and 3.54 for DO matriculants. DO medical schools are more likely to accept non-traditional students, such as those who are older or coming to medicine as a second career.

MD students take the United States Medical Licensing Examination (USMLE) series of three licensing exams during and after medical school.

DO students are required to take the Comprehensive Osteopathic Medical Licensure Examination (COMLEX-USA) administered by the National Board of Osteopathic Medical Examiners (NBOME). This exam is a prerequisite for DO-associated residency programs, which are available in almost every specialty of medicine and surgery. DO medical students may also choose to sit for the USMLE if they wish to increase their competitiveness for residency and about 48% take USMLE Step 1. However, if they have taken COMLEX, USMLE Step 1 may or may not be needed, depending on the individual institution's program requirements.

=== Residency ===
Currently, the ACGME accredits all MD and DO residency programs, while previously the American Osteopathic Association (AOA) accredited all DO residency programs. Now all DO students apply to ACGME-accredited residency programs through the National Resident Matching Program (NRMP) rather than completing a DO residency. As of 2014, 54% of DOs in post-doctoral training are enrolled in an ACGME-accredited residency program and 46% are enrolled in an AOA-accredited residency program.

Since 1981, a single residency training program can be dually accredited by both the ACGME and the AOA. The number of dually accredited programs increased from 11% of all AOA-approved residencies in 2006 to 14% in 2008, and then to 22% in 2010. In 2000, the AOA adopted a provision making it possible for a DO resident in any MD program to apply for osteopathic approval of their training. Dual accreditation is controversial. Opponents claim that by merging DO students into the "MD world", the unique quality of osteopathic philosophy will be lost. Supporters claim the programs are popular because of the higher prestige and higher resident reimbursement salaries associated with MD programs.

Over five years starting in July 2015, the AOA, AACOM, and the ACGME will create a single, unified accreditation system for graduate medical education programs in the United States. This will ensure that all physicians trained in the US will have the same graduate medical education accreditation, and as of June 30, 2020, the AOA will cease its accreditation functions.

There are notable differences in the specialty choices of DOs and MDs. 60% of DOs work in primary care specialties, compared to 35% of MDs.

For IMG graduates applying for residency training in the US, the Educational Commission for Foreign Medical Graduates assesses the applicants' preparedness for entering these US training programs. IMG physicians tend to enter primary care at higher rates than US MD physicians.

=== Steps to license ===
	MD	DO
Standardized admissions examination	Medical College Admission Test (MCAT)	
Medical school application service	AMCAS/TMDSAS	AACOM/TMDSAS
Years of medical school	4	
Medical Licensing Exams (MLE)	USMLE required	COMLEX required USMLE optional
Residency (Prior to June 30, 2020)	MD (ACGME)	One must be selected: DO (AOA) MD (ACGME) combined DO/MD AOA approval of an ACGME program
Residency (Current)	ACGME	
Board certification	MD medical specialty boards	Either DO or MD medical specialty boards

=== Continuing medical education ===
To maintain a professional license to practice medicine, U.S. physicians are required to complete ongoing additional training, known as continuing medical education (CME). CME requirements differ from state to state and between the American Osteopathic Medical Association (DO) and the American Medical Association (MD/DO) governing bodies.

== International recognition ==
An MD degree is accepted in most countries worldwide, while the DO degree is currently accepted in 85 countries abroad; this does not indicate that the DO degree is rejected in the rest of the countries but showcases a history of graduates approaching the medical boards of the accepting countries. DO graduates may apply to countries outside of the 85 countries for recognition or practicing rights. Accredited DO and MD medical schools are both included in the World Health Organization's World Directory of Medical Schools.

== See also ==
- Physicians in the United States
