= Council of Osteopathic Student Government Presidents =

American college student organization

- Abbreviation: COSGP
- Formation: 1972
- Parent organization: American Association of Colleges of Osteopathic Medicine
- Website: cosgp.aacom.org

The Council of Osteopathic Student Government Presidents (COSGP) was established in 1972 as an official council of the American Association of Colleges of Osteopathic Medicine (AACOM) to serve as the official national representative voting voice of osteopathic medical students. There are currently 48 accredited colleges of osteopathic medicine that offer the Doctor of Osteopathic Medicine (DO) degree, with 75 locations in 36 states nationwide. The council includes a student representatives from each of these schools. COSGP serves as a national voting body within AACOM and the American Osteopathic Association (AOA) and represents the collective voice of osteopathic medical students.

== Purpose and goals ==
The main purposes of COSGP are to foster the exchange of ideas, information, and problem-solving for issues that affect individual colleges of osteopathic medicine, and to effectively communicate and represent the osteopathic medical student perspective to professional and educational organizations such as AACOM and AOA.

Further efforts of COSGP are focused on professional development and leadership, and to support the principles and pride of osteopathic medicine among osteopathic medical students and the public.

The COSGP is governed by an executive board, which is elected during the April Quarterly meeting and consists of six members elected by the General Council Members: Chair, First Vice Chair, Second Vice Chair, Secretary, Treasurer, and Parliamentarian. In addition to the executive board, six Representative Officers are appointed: Legislative Affairs, Medical Education, Research, Programs, Communications, and Public Relations and Website. Student Government Presidents of every osteopathic medical schools comprise the general council of the COSGP.

== Activities ==
The COSGP Student Services Committee coordinates selection of the Student DO of the Year (SDOY) at each college of osteopathic medicine as well as a national winner. The national SDOY winner receives a $1000 scholarship and recognition of the COSGP. The winners of SDOY from each osteopathic medical school are announced in April and will be recognized at both the AACOM Annual Meeting, in April, and the AOA House of Delegates in July, respectively.

Another program, started in 2004, the Translating Osteopathic Understanding into Community Health (TOUCH) program encourages and recognizes Osteopathic medical students who participate in community service. All students who participate in at least 50 hours over the course of a school year receive an official TOUCH pin.

In addition, each year in conjunction with the AOA Convention, COSGP sponsors a Student Seminar. Past seminar speakers include Senator Joe Heck, DO, from the Nevada State Senate, who spoke about "Leadership and Political Activity as a Physician," and Jay Kirkham, OMS II from AZCOM, and a former lobbyist on Capitol Hill, who spoke about the 2008 Presidential Election regarding each candidate's views on healthcare.

Finally, in memory of the passengers aboard Flight 5966, the COSGP encourages events to be held on all campuses and throughout communities in order to honor all those who exemplify compassion and humanism, and those who inspire others to do the same during the Day of Compassion in October annually.

In 2011, the Student Government Council passed a resolution through the AOA House of Delegates to increase awareness about depression amongst medical students, as their heavy workloads and high stress levels contribute to higher rates of depression than the general population. The resolution aims to help medical students connect with resources for preventing and treating depression. Also in 2011, the Student Government Council passed a resolution through the AOA House of Delegates to commit to establishing and supporting tobacco-free osteopathic medical college campuses.

== See also ==
American Association of Colleges of Osteopathic Medicine
