= Humayun Chaudhry =

American physician and medical educator

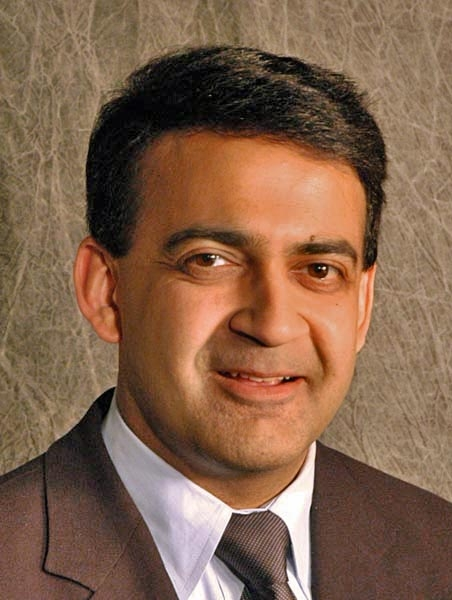

Personal details
- Born: Humayun Javaid Chaudhry; November 17, 1965 (age 60)
- Education: New York University (BA, MS); New York Institute of Technology College of Osteopathic Medicine (DO); Harvard University (MS)
- Occupation: Physician

Humayun "Hank" Chaudhry (born November 17, 1965) is an American physician and medical educator who is president and chief executive officer of the Federation of State Medical Boards (FSMB) of the United States, a national non-profit organization founded in 1912 that represents the 70 state medical boards of the United States and its territories and which co-sponsors the United States Medical Licensing Examination (USMLE). From 2007 to 2009, he served as Commissioner of Health Services for Suffolk County, New York, the state's most populous county outside New York City. In 2016, he was listed by Modern Healthcare magazine as one of the 50 Most Influential Physician Executives and Leaders.

Chaudhry is co-author of Medical Licensing and Discipline in America, published by Lexington Books in 2012, and principal author of Fundamentals of Clinical Medicine, 4th edition, a textbook for medical students and physicians in training that was published by Lippincott, Williams & Wilkins in 2004. His previous faculty appointments have included Clinical Associate Professor of Internal Medicine at the University of Texas Southwestern Medical School and Clinical Associate Professor of Preventive Medicine at Stony Brook University School of Medicine in New York. He is the recipient of a Laureate Award from the American College of Physicians and has been inducted into the American Osteopathic Association's Mentor Hall of Fame.

In 2014, he was elected Chair-Elect of the International Association of Medical Regulatory Authorities by its Members General Assembly during a biennial meeting in London. In 2024, he was elected to the Board of Trustees of the New York Institute of Technology.

== Early life and education ==
Humayun Javaid Chaudhry was raised in Brooklyn, New York, where he attended Public School 199 and Andries Hudde Junior High School. He graduated from Midwood High School and its Medical Science Institute at the age of 16. He received a B.A. in biology and an M.S. in anatomy from New York University, followed by a D.O. (Doctor of Osteopathic Medicine) degree from the New York Institute of Technology College of Osteopathic Medicine. In 2001, he received a Master of Science degree in Health Care Management from the Harvard School of Public Health.

He completed an osteopathic rotating internship at St. Barnabas Hospital, Bronx, New York, followed by a three-year residency in Internal Medicine at Winthrop-University Hospital in Mineola, New York, where he served an additional year, from 1995 to 1996, as Chief Medical Resident.

== Career ==
=== Interstate Medical License Compact advocacy ===
On October 10, 2013, the Federation of State Medical Boards issued a press release announcing "substantial progress" in the development of an interstate medical license compact to facilitate the ability of physicians to practice medicine across state borders. "As our health care system continues to change," said Chaudhry, "the need for increased license portability has become more pressing." The proposed compact is expected to maintain state authority and control, establish high standards for physician eligibility, and ensure a well-coordinated and fairly-applied system of oversight and discipline.

Chaudhry served as the facilitator of a meeting of representatives of state medical boards in January 2013 in Dallas, Texas, that formally led to the proposal for an interstate compact. On March 13, Chaudhry and Lance Talmage, M.D., then chair of the FSMB board of directors, received a bipartisan letter of support signed by U.S. Senator John Thune of South Dakota and seven other U.S. Senators (Thomas Carper, Roger Wicker, James Inhofe, John Barrasso, Mike Enzi, Tim Johnson, and Lamar Alexander) applauding "the efforts of the Federation of State Medical Boards (FSMB) on the work you are doing in examining solutions that would allow for more efficient sharing of medical licensure information that is necessary for the advancement of telehealth technology." The letter expressed the hope that the FSMB can leverage resources "to develop a proposal that satisfies the myriad of complex issues associated with licensure portability."

In an article in The New York Times on June 30, 2014, Chaudhry said, “The proposed compact would create a new pathway to speed the licensing of doctors seeking to practice medicine in multiple states,” adding that "it would allow doctors to see more patients than ever before, if they want to.”

=== USMLE scoring controversy ===
In 2018, Peter Katsufrakis, MD, President and CEO of the National Board of Medical Examiners, wrote an article with Chaudhry arguing for caution about changes to the USMLE Step 1 examination in Improving Residency Selection Requires Close Study and Better Understanding of Stakeholder Needs: "If students reduce time and effort devoted to preparing for Step 1, they may indeed devote attention to other activities that will prepare them to be good physicians. This would arguably be an ideal outcome of such a change. However, if students were to devote more time to activities that make them less prepared to provide quality care, such as binge-watching the most recent Netflix series or compulsively updating their Instagram account, this could negatively impact residency performance and ultimately patient safety. We know that assessment drives learning, so another concern resulting from a shift to pass/fail scoring may be a less knowledgeable physician population." Katsufrakis subsequently issued an apology for inserting unintended "harshness" into the article. In February 2020, the USMLE announced that it would move Step 1 to pass/fail scoring in 2022.

=== Advocacy of Maintenance of Licensure ===
In 2010, the House of Delegates of the Federation of State Medical Boards approved a policy framework for "Maintenance of Licensure" (MOL) that recommends that all U.S. physicians, as a condition of licensure renewal, "should provide evidence of participation in a program of professional development and lifelong learning." The MOL framework proposes three components: reflective self-assessment, assessment of knowledge and skills, and performance in practice.

Chaudhry chairs a CEO Advisory Council that advises the FSMB's board of directors and works with an FSMB MOL Implementation Group, which has recommended that physicians actively engaged in the Maintenance of Certification (MOC) program of the American Board of Medical Specialties, or the Osteopathic Continuous Certification (OCC) program of the American Osteopathic Association, should be recognized as "substantially in compliance" with any MOL program that is adopted by a state. For those physicians not board-certified in a specialty of medicine or surgery, or for those not engaged in MOC or OCC, the program envisions states allowing multiple options by which each of the components of MOL can be achieved for licensure renewal.

On August 5, 2010, Chaudhry joined David Blumenthal, M.D., President Barack Obama's National Coordinator for Health Information Technology at the time, and Marilyn Tavenner, then Principal Deputy Administrator of the Centers for Medicare and Medicaid Services, at a news conference at the National Press Club in Washington, D.C., where Chaudhry noted that "health information technology, generally, and electronic health records, in particular, could be of value as doctors fulfill (their) professional obligation and demonstrate ongoing clinical competence through MOL."

=== Medical regulation ===
State medical and osteopathic boards in the United States took 5,721 disciplinary actions against physicians in 2009, an increase of 342 actions over 2008, according to a report by the Federation of State Medical Boards. Writing in the introduction to the report, Chaudhry cautioned against using those numbers to compare or rank states. "Changes in a board's funding, staffing levels, changes in state law and many other factors," he said, "can impact the number of actions taken by a board."

In an interview with The New York Times about telemedicine and virtual medicine, Chaudhry noted that the Federation of State Medical Boards' guidelines define a patient-doctor relationship as "clearly established and begun when a physician agrees to undertake diagnosis and treatment of the patient, and the patient agrees." He stressed the importance of ensuring that patients receive the same standard of care online as in person. "It should be the same exact standard as if the patient was in your examining room," he cautioned. "You can't cut corners."

From 2009 Chaudhry has served as secretary of the management committee for the International Association of Medical Regulatory Authorities. In 2010, and again in 2012 and 2014, he was elected representative of the United States to IAMRA's General Assembly.

=== Health Commissioner ===
As Commissioner of Health Services for New York's Suffolk County from 2007 to 2009, Chaudhry supervised 1,500 employees and oversaw an annual budget of $400 million. He created a Division of Preventive Medicine within the department through a restructuring of 72 personnel that was approved by Suffolk County Executive Steve Levy and the Suffolk County Legislature and which went into effect on January 1, 2008. "We can't make people live forever," Chaudhry said in an article in The New York Times about the new division, "but we can prevent premature deaths."

During the 2009 flu pandemic due to Influenza A virus subtype H1N1, Chaudhry was praised for taking a cautious public health approach to the new virus, recommending closure of schools when needed and setting up e-mail alerts for Suffolk County administrators. Describing his department's public health response to the 2009 flu pandemic in an Op-Ed article in Newsday, Chaudhry noted the advantages of advanced technology (e.g., BlackBerry, Twitter) in tracking the virus and keeping in close communication with local, state and federal health officials. Named "Long Islander of the Week" and "Dr. Stay-Well," Newsday recognized Chaudhry for "intently but calmly... (steering) the public on a better middle course between apathy and alarm." Suffolk County Executive Steve Levy described him as someone with "an uncanny ability to take complex medical issues and explain them in layman's terms to the public," adding that Chaudhry "helped to guide the county through a number of health crises during his tenure in a masterful way."

During Chaudhry's tenure, Suffolk County adopted a ban on trans fats, derived from partially hydrogenated oil, from its restaurants in 2009. Suffolk County became the first jurisdiction in the United States to ban the sale of baby bottles containing the chemical Bisphenol A, in a measure that Chaudhry said would be enforced with the assistance of consumer complaints. Justifying Suffolk County's actions against Bisphenol A, Chaudhry said, "There was enough evidence to warrant some type of intervention before that final study is done that shows this to be harmful." The County's lawmakers also voted to support a proposal (the first in the nation) to ban the indoor use of electronic cigarettes in public buildings, a move Chaudhry supported.

=== Medical educator ===
Following the completion of his medical residency training in Internal Medicine, Chaudhry served from 1996 to 2001 as director of medical education at Long Beach Medical Center, a 202-bed community teaching hospital in Long Beach, New York. From 2001 to 2007, he served as full-time chairman of the Department of Medicine at the College of Osteopathic Medicine of New York Institute of Technology, where he also served from 2003 to 2005 as assistant dean for pre-clinical education, supervising the undergraduate medical education delivered to first- and second-year medical students, and from 2005 to 2007 as the assistant dean for health policy.

Chaudhry is the principal author of the medical student textbook Fundamentals of Clinical Medicine, written with co-authors from New York University School of Medicine, Cleveland Clinic Foundation, Tufts-New England Medical Center and Brigham and Women's Hospital. The book was praised by Jerome P. Kassirer, M.D., MACP, editor-in-chief of the New England Journal of Medicine from 1991 to 1999, who wrote in its foreword, "Every medical student should have this book." Chaudhry's book, Medical Licensing and Discipline in America, co-written with David Johnson, was cited as an authority in the U.S. Supreme Court's 2015 decision in North Carolina Board of Dental Examiners versus Federal Trade Commission in Associate Justice Samuel Alito's dissenting opinion.

From 1999 to 2007, Chaudhry served in the United States Air Force Reserves as a physician and medical educator, rising to the rank of major and serving as a flight surgeon on flight status with the 732nd Airlift Squadron and as the medical operations flight commander for the 514th Aeromedical Staging Squadron (ASTS) of the 514th Air Mobility Wing, both at McGuire Air Force Base, New Jersey. Chaudhry has flown on training missions on the C-141 Starlifter, KC-10 Extender, and the C-17 Globemaster III and is the recipient of an Air Force Commendation Medal, an Air Force Achievement Medal and a Small Arms Expert Marksmanship Ribbon.

From 2009 through 2012, Chaudhry delivered a lecture in the Foundations of Public Health course at the Harvard School of Public Health in Boston, Massachusetts, and from 2002 through 2012 taught electrocardiography at the New York Institute of Technology College of Osteopathic Medicine. He served as president of the American College of Osteopathic Internists from 2008 to 2009 and as president of the Association of Osteopathic Directors and Medical Educators from 2007 to 2009. On April 11, 2013, he was awarded the title of Master of the American College of Physicians for "excellence in the practice of medicine" at a ceremony in San Francisco.

=== Health policy ===
From 1995 to 2004, Chaudhry was the author of resolutions adopted by the American Medical Association, the Medical Society of the State of New York, the New York State chapter of the American Society of Internal Medicine, and the New York Chapter of the American College of Physicians on such subjects as the promotion of warning labels on herbal supplements, support for state funding of cancer prevalence mapping in New York, physician education about prevailing screening guidelines, medical resident duty hours and supervision, managed care principles and practices, physician workforce predictions and the training of physicians in women's health.

As chair of the Health and Public Policy Committee of the New York Chapter of the American College of Physicians, Chaudhry served as the lead author of a white paper in 2006 on the future of primary care medicine in New York State.

== Research ==
Chaudhry has written more than 50 articles in peer-reviewed medical journals in the areas of public health, preventive medicine, medical education and infectious diseases, including maintenance of licensure, studies on ways to improve vaccine utilization in acute care settings, the development of a multimedia online orientation for the third-year medicine clerkship, a comprehensive review of drug-induced aseptic meningitis, a review of streptococcal paratracheal abscesses, and a consensus statement on abdominal girth and cardiometabolic risk.
