= Medical Licensing Board of Indiana =

State agency in Indiana, United States

Coordinates: 39.76809514502306°N 86.16584511548119°W

Board overview
- Formed: March 8, 1897; 129 years ago
- Jurisdiction: Indiana
- Headquarters: Indianapolis, Indiana
- Board executives: John Strobel, M.D., President; Kirk Masten, D.O., Vice President; Victoria McCann, J.D., Consumer member and Secretary; Bharat Barai, M.D., member; Rebecca Moredock-Mueller, member; Michael Busk, M.D.,, member

The Medical Licensing Board of Indiana is a state government agency that licenses and disciplines physicians, surgeons, and other healthcare professionals in Indiana. It is a member of the Federation of State Medical Boards.

== History ==
The Medical Licensing Board was established as the State Board of Medical Registration and Examination by an act of the Indiana General Assembly in 1897. Upon establishment, the board first issued licenses for physicians; it expanded to osteopaths in 1901. It had responsibility for chiropractic until 1981 and for podiatry until 1993; those areas are now governed by the Board of Chiropractic Examiners and the Podiatric Medicine Board, respectively.

In 1945, the word "State" was dropped from the board's name, making it the Board of Medical Registration and Examination of Indiana; its current name, the Medical Licensing Board, was adopted in 1975.

== Governance and makeup ==
The board is made up of seven members, appointed by the state governor, no more than four of whom can be of the same political party. Five of the members are required to be physicians, and one an osteopathic physician; the seventh member serves as a representative of the general public and is required to be in no way associated with the medical profession other than as a consumer. Members serve a four-year term, with no limit on the number of times they can be re-appointed.

The board is responsible for licensing the following:

- Doctors of Medicine (M.D.);
- Doctors of Osteopathic Medicine (D.O.);
- Licensed dietitians (L.D.);
- Anesthesiologist assistants;
- Genetic counselors;
- Limited scope physicians (a temporary permit, limited to specific activities, functions, series of events or purpose, and to a specific geographic area within the state of Indiana);
- Non-Educational Commission for Foreign Medical Graduates permits;
- Postgraduate training permits;
- Teaching permits;
- Diabetes educators.
- Volunteer health care registry locations; and
- Acupuncturists.

The board is governed by Article 22.5 of the Indiana Code, and by the regulations in Title 844 of the Indiana Administrative Code.
