= Oregon Medical Board =

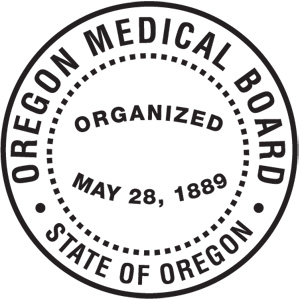
Seal of the Oregon Medical Board

The Oregon Medical Board (OMB) is the agency of the government of the U.S. state of Oregon responsible for establishing the rules and regulations governing the practice of medicine in Oregon. The Board's office is located in Portland, Oregon. It is a member of the Federation of State Medical Boards.

== Organization ==
The Oregon Medical Board is established and granted authority by Oregon Revised Statute 677, the Medical Practice Act. The Board implements this authority through rules adopted under Oregon Administrative Rules chapter 847.

The 14 members of the Board are appointed by the Governor of Oregon and confirmed by the Oregon State Senate. Board members serve three-year terms and may be reappointed for one additional term.

=== Activities ===
The Board issues and renews licenses for the following health care providers:

- Doctor of Medicine (MD)
- Doctor of Osteopathic Medicine (DO)
- Podiatrists (DPM)
- Physician Assistants (PA)
- Acupuncturists (LAc)

The Board investigates complaints against licensees and takes disciplinary action when a violation of the Medical Practice Act occurs.

== Criticism ==
Oregon Senators Alan Bates and Elizabeth Steiner-Hayward expressed concerns in 2012 pertaining to the Board's regulation of the practice of medicine.

In at least one instance, concerns have been raised by the public that board investigators may be manufacturing allegations against medical providers, although the reasons for this are unclear.
