= Edithe J. Levit =

American medical educator (1926–2006)

Edithe J. Levit (née Miller; 1926 – October 18, 2006) was an American medical educator who served as president of the National Board of Medical Examiners from 1977 to 1986. She reformed the process of assessing doctors' clinical competence using standardized tests rather than subjective bedside observation.

== Life ==
Edithe J. Miller was born in 1926 in Wilkes-Barre, Pennsylvania. She studied biology at Bucknell University before completing medical studies at the Medical College of Pennsylvania from 1948 to 1952. She married Samuel Levit, a fellow physician, in 1953 and they had two sons.

Levit began her career at Philadelphia General Hospital, where she trained initially as an endocrinologist. In 1957, she took on a role at the hospital as director of medical education. She joined the board of the National Board of Medical Examiners (NBME) in 1961, where she played a large role in developing "patient management problems" (PMPs) to test medical students' competence in clinical observation and decision-making in a standardized way. PMPs were written tests that replaced more subjective assessments for granting medical licenses, which involved observation of candidates during face-to-face encounters with real patients. In 1977, Levit became president of the NBME, making her the first female president and chief executive officer of a national medical association in the United States. She advocated for further reforms in medical examination, including computerized testing and the use of audiovisual aids and simulations. She was elected to the National Academy of Medicine in 1978.

Levit retired from the NBME in 1986. She died on October 18, 2006, from lung cancer.
