= National Board of Podiatric Medical Examiners =

The National Board of Podiatric Medical Examiners (NBPME) is an American non-profit corporation that created competency examinations in podiatric medicine. State medical licensing agencies may choose to make passage of the exams a requirement to licensure in their state.

The NBPME examinations consist of three parts. Parts I and II of the exam test a student's knowledge of science and medicine as they pertain to podiatry. Part III of the exam was formerly known as the Podiatric Medical Licensing Examination for States, or PMLexis, and is a clinical examination taken after graduation from podiatric medical school.

== See also ==
- Podiatry
- Federation of State Medical Boards
