= United States Medical Licensing Examination =

U.S. examination program for medical licensure

- Acronym: USMLE
- Type: Computer-based, three-part sequence, standardized test
- Administrator: Federation of State Medical Boards, National Board of Medical Examiners
- Skills tested: Step 1: Application of scientific principles basic to the practice of medicine Step 2: Application of medical knowledge, skills, and understanding of clinical science essential for supervised patient care Step 3: Application of medical knowledge and understanding of biomedical and clinical science essential for the unsupervised practice of medicine
- Purpose: Medical licensure in the United States
- Year started: 1992; 34 years ago
- Duration: Step 1: 8 hours Step 2: 9 hours Step 3 (Day 1): 7 hours Step 3 (Day 2): 9 hours
- Score range: Step 1: pass/fail Step 2: 1-300 (218 to pass); Step 3: 1-300 (200 to pass)
- Offered: Year round
- Regions: Globally at a Prometric centers for Step 1 and Step 2 CK; at a U.S. Prometric centers for Step 3
- Languages: English
- Annual number of test takers: More than 100,000 medical school students and graduates (2020)
- Fee: Step 1: US$680.00; Step 2: US$680.00; Step 3: US$935.00
- Used by: State medical boards in the U.S. and U.S. Territories
- Website: www.usmle.org

The United States Medical Licensing Examination (USMLE) is a three-step examination program for medical licensure in the United States, sponsored by the Federation of State Medical Boards (FSMB) and the National Board of Medical Examiners (NBME). Individuals with a Doctor of Medicine (MD) degree are required to pass the USMLE for medical licensure. Those with a Doctor of Osteopathic Medicine degree (DO) may take either the COMLEX-USA or the USMLE for medical licensure, with the COMLEX-USA being required for osteopathic licensure.

It is a standardized test that assesses a medical student's knowledge of basic science concepts and their application to clinical medicine. The exam is divided into three components required for medical licensure in the United States and is typically taken by students after their second year of medical school. States may enact additional testing and/or licensing requirements.

== History ==
The USMLE was created in the early 1990s. The program replaced the multiple examinations, including the National Board of Medical Examiners Part Examination program and the Federation of State Medical Boards Federation Licensing Examination (FLEX) program, that offered paths to medical licensing in the medical profession.

The examination was originally imparted using pencil and paper. In 1999, computerized examination delivery was included. In 2004, an examination with standardized patients to assess clinical-skills was added to Step 2 of the USMLE (Step 2 Clinical Skills), and required for licensure beginning with the medical school graduating class of 2005. During the COVID-19 pandemic, USMLE Step 2CS was initially suspended and later discontinued.

A review of the program was enacted in 2009. USMLE claimed it was done with the intention of orienting the examination to support the licensing decisions made by medical boards, transitioning the exam to a competencies schema and emphasizing the importance of scientific foundations of medicine throughout the examination sequence. They also aimed to continue the assessment of clinical skill and interpretation of clinical information.

USMLE announced a move to a pass/fail model for Step 1 on February 12, 2020, along with other changes. They claimed this was done in an attempt by the Federation of State Medical Boards (FSMB) and the National Board of Medical Examiners (NBME) to balance focus between exams and actual coursework. The change became effective in 2022.

Before 1992, the NBME Part I examination was the primary basic science examination for medical students at the end of their second year. When the three-part United States Medical Licensing Examination was launched, the NBME Part I exam was incorporated into its new format, the USMLE Step 1 examination. Over time, the exam has evolved into a more clinically applied examination of the foundational sciences. The exam became computer-based several years later. In May 2015, the USMLE began emphasizing concepts related to patient safety and quality improvement across all parts of the USMLE exam series, including Step 1.

While traditionally, students took the USMLE Step 1 exam after completing foundational sciences and before core clinical clerkships, in the past decade, a growing number of medical schools have reformed their curricula to have students take the USMLE Step 1 after core clinical clerkships or preliminary clinical training.

In response to concerns about the role of USMLE Step 1 scores in residency selection and the negative impact on medical student mental health, the United States Medical Licensing Examination (USMLE) announced significant changes to the exam in 2020. One of the major changes was the transition to a pass/fail scoring system from the previous three-digit score reporting system. The change was made to encourage a shift in focus from "high-stakes testing" to "learning and individual improvement", as well as to alleviate some of the stress associated with the exam. These changes were implemented starting in January 2022, with the first USMLE Step 1 scores reported in the pass/fail format in February 2022.

Generative AI models can now pass all steps of the exam.

== Description and purpose ==
The United States Medical Licensing Examination (USMLE) is required for medical licensure in the United States by all graduates of M.D.-granting American medical schools as well as all graduates of international medical schools. It consists of three examinations:

- Step 1: Assesses foundational medical science typically obtained during the first two years of medical school
- Step 2CK: Evaluates the applicant's knowledge of clinical medicine
- Step 3: Assesses the application of clinical knowledge to patient management

Previously, USMLE included a clinical skills portion called USMLE Step 2 Clinical Skills. It was discontinued during the COVID-19 pandemic. Step 1 and 2 are typically completed by U.S. medical students during medical school, while Step 3 is usually taken by the end of the first year of residency. While the USMLE Step 1 and Step 2 CK exams can be taken at Prometric test centers worldwide, the Step 3 can only be taken in the United States.

The USMLE is sponsored by the Federation of State Medical Boards (FSMB) and the National Board of Medical Examiners (NBME). They developed it originally to provide state medical boards in the United States with a common examination for all licensure applicants. However, over time it has also been extensively used by residency programs to predict residency performance and screen residents for selection during the National Resident Matching Program. Even though it was estimated that at least 60% of osteopathic medical students took at least one USMLE exam in 2020, physicians with D.O. degree are not required to take the USMLE for licensure or graduation. They are licensed as physicians by passing Parts I, II, and III of the COMLEX examination from the National Board of Osteopathic Medical Examiners.

As of 2024, to be eligible for the United States Medical Licensing Examination (USMLE), candidates must meet specific criteria based on the step of the exam they are applying for:

Step 1 and Step 2 CK:

Candidates must fall into one of the following categories at the time of application and on the day of the examination:

- Medical students or graduates of U.S. or Canadian MD programs:
  - Must be officially enrolled in, or a graduate of, a U.S. or Canadian medical school program leading to the MD degree, accredited by the Liaison Committee on Medical Education (LCME).
- Medical students or graduates of U.S. DO programs:
  - Must be officially enrolled in, or a graduate of, a U.S. medical school program leading to the DO degree, accredited by the Commission on Osteopathic College Accreditation (COCA).
- Medical students or graduates of international medical schools:
  - Must be officially enrolled in, or a graduate of, a medical school outside the U.S. and Canada that is listed in the World Directory of Medical Schools as meeting the Educational Commission for Foreign Medical Graduates (ECFMG) eligibility requirements, and must meet all other eligibility criteria of the ECFMG.

Step 3:

To be eligible for Step 3, candidates must:

- Have passed Step 1 and Step 2 CK:
  - Successfully obtain passing scores on both Step 1 and Step 2 CK.
- Hold an MD or DO degree:
  - Possess an MD or DO degree from an LCME- or COCA-accredited U.S. or Canadian medical school, or an equivalent MD degree from an international medical school listed in the World Directory of Medical Schools that meets ECFMG eligibility requirements and obtain ECFMG Certification.
- Meet additional criteria:
  - Fulfill all other eligibility requirements as outlined in the USMLE Bulletin of Information.

The USMLE program also recommends that applicants for Step 3 have completed, or be near completion of, at least one year of postgraduate training in an accredited U.S. graduate medical education program that satisfies state board licensing requirements.

== Examination components ==
=== Step 1 ===
National Step 1 means among US and Canadian first time test-takers by year
Year	Mean score	Standard deviation
2021	231	19
2020	235	18
2019	232	19
2018	230	19
2017	229	20
2016	228	21
2015	229	20
2014	229	20
2013	226	21
2012	224	21
2011	224	22
2010	222	24
2009	221	24
2008	221	23

View source data.

The United States Medical Licensing Examination (USMLE) Step 1 is a computer-based test that assesses whether medical students or graduates can apply important concepts of the foundational sciences fundamental to the practice of medicine. The exam consists of 280 multiple-choice questions, divided into seven 40-question blocks, and takes eight hours to complete.

Step 1 is designed to test the knowledge learned during the basic science years of medical school as applied in the form of clinical vignettes. This includes anatomy, behavioral sciences, biochemistry, microbiology, pathology, pharmacology, and physiology, as well as to interdisciplinary areas including genetics, aging, immunology, nutrition, and molecular and cell biology. Epidemiology, medical ethics and questions on empathy are also emphasized. Each exam is dynamically generated for each test taker; while the general proportion of questions derived from a particular subject is the same, some test takers report that certain subjects are either emphasized or deemphasized.

The USMLE Step 1 exam underwent a significant change in its scoring system in 2022, transitioning from a three-digit numeric score to a pass/fail system. Prior to this change, students received a score ranging from 1 to 300, with most scores ranging from 140 to 260. The passing score was 196, and the national mean and standard deviation were approximately 232 and 19, respectively. The scoring system used to be percentile-based, but in 1999 it was phased out in favor of the three-digit and two-digit scaled scoring system. Two-digit scores were eliminated from the score report in 2013.

=== Step 2 Clinical Knowledge (CK) ===
The exam is administered in a 9-hour single-day computer-based session. The session is divided into eight one-hour blocks of questions, a 15 minute tutorial and a 45 minute break. The 15-minute tutorial at the beginning of the exam is optional. The 45 minutes allowed for breaks can only be taken between sections at the discretion of the test taker. Both the unused tutorial time and time saved from finishing a test block early is added to the break time. The test is administered at the Prometric testing sites. Prior to 2020, the Step 2 exam consisted of both the CK ("Clinical Knowledge") portion, as well as a CS ("Clinical Skills") exam. However, the CS exam was put on hold in May 2020, and permanently discontinued in January 2021.

Step 2 CK includes test items in the following content areas: internal medicine, obstetrics and gynecology, pediatrics, preventive medicine, psychiatry, neurology, surgery, other areas relevant to provision of care under supervision. Most Step 2 CK test items describe clinical situations and require that you provide one or more of the following: diagnosis, a prognosis, an indication of underlying mechanisms of disease, the next step in medical care, including preventive measures. Step 2 CK is an integrated examination that frequently requires the interpretation of tables and laboratory data, imaging studies, photographs of gross and microscopic pathologic specimens, and results of other diagnostic studies. Step 2 CK tests the aspiring physician's knowledge of medicine putting special emphasis on the principles and mechanisms underlying disease, and the therapies needed to address them.

The Step 2CK scores are reported in a 3 digit format with a range between 1 and 300. As of July 1, 2025, the passing score is 218. As of academic year 2023-2024, the mean CK score was 249 with a standard deviation of 15 for first-time takers from accredited medical schools in the United States and Canada. Approximately once every four years, the USMLE decides whether to change the recommended minimum passing score. At its May 2014 meeting, the Step 2 Committee conducted a review for USMLE Step 2 Clinical Knowledge (CK) and decided to raise the Step 2 minimum passing score to 209 for students taking the test after July 1, 2014. In 2022, the passing score was increased to 214, with an implementation date of July 1, 2022. In 2025, the passing score was increased to 218, with an implementation date of July 1, 2025. USMLE provides each test taker with a score report that includes information on their performance on various physician tasks, disciplines and systems.

=== Step 2 Clinical Skills (CS) ===
Step 2 Clinical Skills (Step 2 CS) of the USMLE was an exam administered to medical students/graduates who wish to become licensed physicians in the U.S. It is similar to the COMLEX-USA Level 2-PE exam, taken by osteopathic medical students/graduates who seek licensure as physicians in the U.S. For US medical students, the exam fee is $1,300 (as of 2020). For medical students at non-US medical schools, the tests cost is higher—currently $1,535. These fees do not include costs associated with travel and lodging to take the test. Historically, US students have taken Step 2 CS late in their senior year, prior to graduation. However, now that more residency programs require students to record a passing score, many US medical schools recommend students take Step 2 CS in the fall of their senior year.

On May 26, 2020, in response to the COVID-19 pandemic, the USMLE "suspended Step 2 CS test administrations for the next 12-18 months." On January 26, 2021, the USMLE announced that the work to relaunch a modified form USMLE Step 2 CS had been discontinued citing rapidly evolving medical education and changes in other standardized exams, like computer-based simulations in Step 3, that would supplement medical students' education in place of Step 2 CS. Before its retirement, the exam could be taken in the U.S. at five Clinical Skills Evaluation Centers (CSEC).

==== Structure ====
The USMLE Step 2CS exam consists of a series of patient encounters in which the examinee must see standardized patients (SPs), take a history, do a physical examination, determine differential diagnoses, and then write a patient note based on their determinations. The topics covered are common outpatient or Emergency Room visits which are encountered in the fields of internal medicine, surgery, psychiatry, pediatrics, and obstetrics and gynecology. Examinees are expected to investigate the simulated patient's chief complaint, as well as obtain a thorough assessment of their past medical history, medications, allergies, social history (including alcohol, tobacco, drug use, sexual practices, etc.), and family history. Usually, examinees have one telephone encounter, speaking to an SP through a microphone during which there is no physical exam component.

Examinees are allowed 15 minutes to complete each encounter and 10 minutes for the patient note for a single patient encounter. The patient note is slightly different from a standard SOAP note. For the exam note, the examinees will document the pertinent facts relating to the history of present illness as well as elements of the past medical history, medication history, allergies, social history, family history, and physical exam. The examinees will then state up to 3 differential diagnoses relating to the simulated patient's symptoms, and tests or procedures to investigate the simulated patient's complaints. The examinees should also list pertinent positive and negative findings to support each potential diagnosis. The examinees will not recommend any specific treatments in the note in contrast to a true clinic SOAP note (i.e., IV fluids, antibiotics, or other medications). Over the course of an 8-hour exam day, the examinees complete 12 such encounters. Examinees are required to type patient notes on a computer.

USMLE Step 2 CS replaced the former ECFMG Clinical Skills Assessment (CSA) effective June 14, 2004. The last administration of the ECFMG Clinical Skills Assessment (CSA) took place on April 16, 2004. When the CSA first started it was strictly for Foreign Medical Graduates while US graduates were not required to do it. That was considered a double standard in the US medical licensing process. Later the CSA was replaced with the USMLE step 2 CS and became inclusive to all medical graduates.

==== Grading ====
The test was graded on a pass/fail basis, without any numerical score associated with it (as opposed to the other parts of the USMLE series). Examinees were scored on three separate subcomponents: Communication and Interpersonal Skills (CIS), Spoken English Proficiency (SEP), and Integrated Clinical Encounter (ICE). Each of the three subcomponents must be passed in a single administration in order to achieve a passing performance on Step 2 CS.

- Communication and Interpersonal Skills (CIS) – includes assessment of the patient-centered communication skills of fostering the relationship, gathering information, providing information, helping the patient make decisions, and supporting emotions. CIS performance is assessed by the standardized patients, who record these skills using a checklist based on observable behaviors.
- Spoken English Proficiency (SEP) – includes assessment of clarity of spoken English communication within the context of the doctor-patient encounter (for example, pronunciation, word choice, and minimizing the need to repeat questions or statements). SEP performance is assessed by the standardized patients using a global rating scale, where the rating is based upon the frequency of pronunciation or word choice errors that affect comprehension and the amount of listener effort required to understand the examinee's questions and responses.
- Integrated Clinical Encounter (ICE) – includes assessments of both data gathering and data interpretation skills. Scoring for this subcomponent consists of a checklist completed by the standardized patients for the physical examination portion of the encounter, and global ratings provided by trained physician raters. The patient note raters provide ratings on the documented summary of the findings of the patient encounter (history and physical examination), diagnostic impressions, justification of the potential diagnoses, and initial patient diagnostic studies.

=== Step 3 ===
Step 3 is the final exam in the USMLE series of examinations. It is part of the licensing requirements for Doctors of Medicine (M.D.), including international medical graduates aiming to practice medicine in the United States. Generally, it is a pre-requisite of the majority of the state licensing boards.

Most of the USMLE Step 3 exam (75 percent) consists of multiple choice questions, while the remaining 25 percent are clinical case simulations. A full description of the content of the exam can be found on the USMLE website. USMLE Step 3 exams are delivered online but administered only at Prometric testing centers, which emphasize identity verification and security. Examinees must provide official photo identification and fingerprints as well as pass both metal detector and physical inspection every time they wish to enter the examination room. Materials allowed within the exam room are extremely limited and most require prior approval, including medical equipment. Examinees are on video surveillance during the examination. The test is available throughout the year to the examinees.

Since 2014 USMLE Step 3 can be taken on two non-consecutive days, instead of two consecutive days. Beginning January 1, 2020 the recommended Step 3 minimum passing score was raised from 196 to 198.

USMLE Step 3 examination tests on topics relevant to the independent practice of general medical care, with an emphasis on patient management in ambulatory settings. The following components are tested:

- Normal conditions and disease categories (normal growth and development, basic concepts, and general principles)
- Clinical encounter frame (initial work up, continuing care, urgent intervention)
- Physician task (applying scientific concepts, formulating a diagnosis based on history, physical exam, and lab findings, and managing the patient).

Clinical encounter frames are common clinical scenarios physicians may encounter. They range from nonemergency problems, to the continuity of care, to life-threatening emergency situations encountered in emergency departments, clinics, offices, care facilities, inpatient settings, and on the telephone. Each test item, in an encounter frame, represents one of the six physician tasks. For example, initial care encounters emphasize taking a history and performing a physical examination. In contrast, continued care encounters emphasize decisions regarding prognosis and management.

- Day 1 (Foundations of Independent Practice [FIP]) is divided into six 60-minute blocks. Each FIP block has 38 to 39 multiple-choice questions (MCQs). As of 2022, the total number of MCQs on the FIP portion of the examination is 232. The total testing day will be approximately 7 hours.
- Day 2 (Advanced Clinical Medicine [ACM]) is divided into six 45-minute blocks of MCQs, and 13 computer-based case simulations (CCS). Each ACM MCQ block includes 30 items.

To be eligible to take the USMLE Step 3 exam, the physician must hold a medical degree. International medical graduates (IMGs) must also obtain certification by the Educational Commission for Foreign Medical Graduates (ECFMG) and fulfil all requirements in the USMLE Bulletin of Information.

== Pass rates and performance ==
First-time USMLE pass rates for D.O. and M.D. students in 2020 were 91 percent and 98 percent, respectively. The first-time pass rate for students from schools outside of the United States and Canada was 90 percent. Trainees in fields which encompass multiple specialties, such as emergency medicine or internal medicine, tend to perform well on Step 3 regardless of when they take the exam; trainees in other fields tend to do better if they take the exam shortly after medical school.

Overall pass rates for the individual Step exams that comprise the USMLE
	Years of data	U.S. M.D. medical school examinees	(US 1st-time takers)	U.S. D.O. medical school examinees	(US DO 1st time)	Examinees from non-US/Canadian schools	(Int'l 1st time)
Step 1	(2021)	95%	96%	94%	94%	77%	82%
Step 2 CK	(2020-2021)	98%	99%	98%	98%	88%	91%
Step 3	(2021)	97%	98%	97%	97%	87%	91%

== Use in residency selection ==
The USMLE score is one of many factors considered by residency programs in selecting applicants. Many residency programs used a "cutoff" score for Step 1, below which applicants were unlikely to be considered. The NRMP Residency Program Director survey contains more information, both overall and by specialty, regarding "cutoff" scores (i.e., scores below which programs generally do not grant interviews).

Studies on Step 1 performance found that "Step 1 is neither precise nor does it predict student performance as residents beyond a certain threshold. With a standard error of eight points, two applicants with scores as far as 15 points apart may not be meaningfully different and yet several programs use singular cutoff points as screening tools." This, as well as the impact on student learning, cost of preparation, diversion of student time toward exam preparation, and desire to decrease racial bias, are amongst the reasons that the USMLE switched to Pass/Fail reporting of Step 1 at the beginning of 2022.

The medical community has criticized the USMLE and residency programs for using Step 1 scores as the main screening tool in selecting applicants for a residency interview. Residency program directors had historically utilized the scores as a means of filtering applications down to a more manageable number that allowed for a more thorough review of the remaining ones. A significant amount of residency program directors believe that the conversion to Pass/Fail will make applicant screening more arduous. In fact, an applicant's Step 1 score has been cited by residency program directors as their most important criterion in selecting graduating medical students for their residency program.

Studies on Step 1 performance found that "Step 1 is neither precise nor does it predict student performance beyond a certain threshold. With a standard error of eight points, two applicants with scores as far as 15 points apart may not be meaningfully different and yet several programs use singular cutoff points as screening tools."

The USMLE Step 2 CK score is one of many factors considered by residency programs in selecting applicants. Along with the USMLE Step 1, this test is a standardized measure of all applicants. The median USMLE Step 2 scores for graduates of U.S. Medical Schools for various residencies is published periodically by the NRMP in their "Charting Outcomes in the Match" documents USMLE Step 1’s pass/fail status in 2022 is likely to enhance the effect of USMLE Step 2 CK on residency matching, since it will remain as the sole standardized factor in the residency application process.

== Changes to Step 1 scoring ==
=== Transition to Pass/Fail ===
It was announced on February 12, 2020, that beginning no earlier than January 2022, USMLE Step 1 would transition to a Pass/Fail scoring system. In July 2020, the USMLE announced that prior transcripts would not be retroactively altered."

While the NBME, USMLE, and FSMB were originally against these changes (which critics argued may have been from potential monetary loss), as of 2020 (and after the formation of InCUS), they have changed their stance in support of the public opinion. Humayun Chaudhry, the President of the FSMB, (who was originally in opposition to the Step changes), later said that "although the primary purpose of the exam is to assess the knowledge and skills essential to safe patient care, the new policies will "address concerns about Step 1 scores impacting student well-being and medical education." Because students put so much emphasis on getting a high USMLE Step 1 score, they often skimmed the medical school curriculum that they deemed to be not as relevant in order to get the maximum score on the USMLE Step 1.

The current use of Step 1 scoring as a major determinant for granting residency interviews has been met with tremendous criticism by the medical community. The public outcry led to the formation of a committee and investigation in early 2019 called the Invitational Conference on USMLE Scoring (InCUS). The USMLE published a list of InCUS participants. In February 2020, InCUS concluded that residencies were overemphasizing Step 1 and not using it for its original purpose for which it was designed as a means of licensing.

Upon reaching these conclusions, the USMLE program announced a plan to change Step 1 score reporting to a Pass/Fail system in an effort "to reduce overemphasis on Step 1 performance while allowing licensing authorities to use the exam for its primary purpose of medical licensure eligibility." The USMLE stated that transition will occur no earlier than January 1, 2022. In July 2020, the USMLE stated that "All scores for Step 1 exams taken prior to the date of the policy change will continue to be reported using the three-digit numeric score on all USMLE transcripts. The USMLE program does not retroactively alter transcripts."

=== Impact and concerns ===
A 2017 study showed that students started studying for Step 1 during their preclinical curriculum and increased the intensity of their study time until it reached 16 hours a day over a period of 4–6 weeks before the exam in a period referred to by medical students as "dedicated". Instead of relying on their medical school curriculum, the students focused heavily on third-party study materials that according to some critics did not help them learn the medical school curriculum.

Since 2001, there has been a strong plea to remove the Step 1 score barrier that disproportionately affects select racial and ethnic groups. "Using Step 1 scores to screen residency applications puts students who are underrepresented in medicine at a disadvantage." Black and Latino students receive markedly lower scores on Step 1 than white students. The mean USMLE step 1 score was significantly greater among white applicants (223) as compared to black and Hispanic applicants (216). Depending on the threshold score, an African American was 3-6x less likely to be offered an interview.

A 2001 study in internal medicine residency showed that "when Step 1 scores were used to screen applicants for interviews, a significantly greater proportion of Black students were refused interviews." A 2019 study on Orthopedic Surgery residency programs (the specialty with the lowest percentage of underrepresented students) showed that between 2005 and 2014, Black and Latino applicants were accepted into residency programs at a significantly lower rate (61%) than white applicants (71%).

Further studies showed a lack of diversity within specialties and that those underrepresented students were more likely to go into specialties that have lower Step 1 cut-offs like Primary Care.

The American Academy of Family Physicians and Association of American Medical Colleges supported changing Step 1 to pass or fail to reduce racial bias. The AAFP wrote that changing Step 1 to Pass/Fail creates a "more equitable student evaluation and residency selection process, as it will reduce the impact of racial and other biases on residency selection. Factors that impact student experience with standardized testing (such as access to test preparation) perpetuate inequities and disparities that impact test performance, but do not predict or capture competency or skills for future physicians." The American Medical Student Association recommended changing scoring to Pass/Fail to reduce the adverse impact of the current overemphasis on USMLE performance in residency screening as well as the associated racial bias. The ECFMG and AMA supported this transition as well.

=== Support for the changes ===
According to the NMBE's InCUS survey results, there were mixed responses regarding support for "consideration of changes such as pass/fail scoring categorical/tiered scoring, and composite scoring." Per the survey, those in agreement with changes include 26% of residency program directors, 32% of current or former state board members, 39% of interns, residents, and fellows, 39% of medical school faculty, 44% of medical students, 67% of course directors, and 75% of Associate/Assistant Deans (of medical schools). Notably, medical students and program directors were among parties with only a minority in favor of this change, despite being the most directly affected. Parties associated with medical schools, namely course directors and Deans were noted to have the most support for changes.

The USMLE parent organizations, including the AAFP, AMSA, and AAMC wrote letters to the USMLE recommended broad, systemic changes to the medical program including changing Step 1 to Pass/Fail. "The current overemphasis on USMLE Step 1 is having an overwhelmingly negative impact on students. This should be addressed immediately. A Pass/Fail score will help provide a more meaningful learning environment, improved emotional climate, and better student-student interactions, which can lead to better academic performance that includes USMLE tests (see Cause or effect?). Additionally, it will decrease racial bias for programs that use USMLE Step 1 scores to grant interviews." Further, they supported the move to Step 1 Pass/Fail citing unintentional negative impact of a single standardized exam on career exploration and selection.

=== Objection to the changes ===
Immediately following the announcement by USMLE that Step 1 would become Pass/Fail in 2022, concern has been expressed from several parties in the medical community, namely residency program directors and medical students, both among US graduates and international graduates.

In a survey of nearly 300 residency program directors in surgical fields, program directors were found to significantly disagree with the statements that changing to Pass/Fail "is a good idea" (78.1% [69.9–86.4%] disagree) and the statement that "Step 2 CK should also be changed to Pass/Fail" (84.0% [76.7–91.3%]). They were also found to significantly agree with the statements that changing to Pass/Fail: "Will make it more difficult to objectively compare applicants" (88.3% [81.9–94.7%]), "Will increase emphasis on Step 2 CK scores in selecting applicants for my program" (88.7% [82.5–95.0%]), "Will make applicant screening more arduous" (85.4% [78.4–92.4%]), "I will now require applicants to submit Step 2 CK scores with ERAS" (88.4% [81.7–95.0%]), and "Where an applicant goes to medical school will be more important in screening and selection for my program" (63.5% [53.8–73.2%]).

US medical students have also expressed concern that priority that would have gone to Step 1 score will instead be shifted to school prestige, student connections, clinical grading, Step 2 CK scores, and extracurricular experiences. In particular, students from DO (Doctor of Osteopathic Medicine) and "low tier" MD schools may be at considerable disadvantage compared to students from prestigious schools. This concern is validated by the aforementioned program director survey. These same schools are less likely to provide the same robust extracurricular opportunities, particularly in terms of highly valued research opportunities for these schools.

Step 2 CK is a three-digit-scored exam typically taken after the third year of medical school, which consists of clinical rotations in primary care fields. In February 2020, the Harvard Crimson wrote, "the fact that Step 2 is a more clinically relevant exam than Step 1, makes it a better proxy for clinical acumen." However, the timing of Step 2 CK is often only months before residency applications are submitted, meaning a poor score could jeopardize a student's application without allowing time to change tracks or bolster other application components.

International medical students and graduates expressed growing concerns that the change will further decrease IMG (International Medical Graduates) chances of matching into US residency programs. Historically, IMGs have been at a significant disadvantage when applying to US residency programs. Outside of scores, residency program directors consider letters of recommendation, clinical grades, and research. Since international medical students come from medical schools with different grading systems and do not usually have access to well-known faculty and American research opportunities, USMLE Step 1 is often seen as a major opportunity to boost IMG residency applications with a high score. Without a numerical score on the USMLE Step 1, there is speculation that IMG's will be further be pushed out of the race for residency program spots. This was supported to some extent by General Surgery program director respondents, which significantly agreed that the changes to Pass/Fail "Will put IMGs at a disadvantage" 56.0% [48.6–63.4%].

== Controversies ==
=== COVID-19 response ===
During the COVID-19 pandemic, the USMLE and NBME were met with criticism from some members of the medical community, including the American Medical Association (AMA), for miscommunication, delays and lack of flexibility during the COVID-19 global pandemic. They were also criticized for reducing the length of the exam at newly established testing centers in some U.S. medical schools to be able to accommodate more students for testing as those changes would diminish the standardization of the tests. There were concerns that these issues would lead to many applicants having incomplete applications during the 2021 match season which would then negatively affect the ability of program directors to effectively evaluate candidates. Prometric eventually added testing sites at some medical schools and re-opened testing centers with new safety protocols. USMLE also reverted the announced changes to the exams length. To accommodate these changes, the Electronic Residency Application Service (ERAS) adjusted the application timeline to allow students an additional month to submit their applications.

On June 4, 2020, the USMLE announced a plan to administer tests at medical schools throughout the nation, but that these exams would notably lack experimental questions, while exams administered at testing centers during the same time period would still have these experimental questions. These experimental questions accounted for 80 of the 280 on the exam, which would have led to the decreasing the total test taking time from 7–8 hours to 5–6 hours. Some commenters expressed concerns since this practice would have "destandardized" the text and test-takers would have been "experimented" on without consent. The USMLE ultimately reverted the announced changes to the exams length.

The USMLE was met with criticism for their lack of adaptability during the COVID-19 pandemic. The criticism was two-fold: First, for the mishandling and poor communication of exam cancellations by both USMLE program administrators and the third-party exam administrator, Prometric. Second, the pandemic crisis exacerbated existing resentment towards the high-stakes nature of the exam: namely, several students and physicians were upset that the USMLE refused to move up the 2022 deadline of making Step 1 into a pass or fail exam.

=== Step 2 CS controversy ===
The Step 2 CS exam was added to the USMLE series in 2004 by the NBME and FSMB. However, the test garnered criticism for its high exam fee and need to travel to one of five testing sites. Even before the exam was rolled out, the American Medical Association raised serious concerns with the exam, both because it failed to provide students feedback and room for remediation and because there was no proof the exam actually accomplished its mission of protecting the public.

Beginning in 2004, the USMLE program undertook a comprehensive review of the USMLE, referred to as the Comprehensive Review of USMLE (CRU). The review was overseen by the committee to Evaluate the USMLE Program (CEUP), which was composed of students, residents, clinicians, and members of the licensing, graduate, and undergraduate education communities. The goal of the committee was to determine if the mission and purpose of USMLE were effectively and efficiently supported by the current design, structure, and format of the USMLE. This process was to be guided, in part, by an analysis of information gathered from stakeholders, and was to result in recommendations to USMLE governance. The CEUP worked from 2006 to early 2008. The CEUP's final report states that "none of the feedback (received from other stakeholders) seemed to indicate that USMLE is broken, but there was considerable interest in enhancing and improving the program." Additionally, the report states that "there appeared to be very strong reactions to Step 2 CS, and CEUP felt that survey and stakeholder meeting data on this component needed to be interpreted in a special way by attempting to separate (but still be attentive to) issues related to the mechanics and costs of Step 2 CS versus the value of what the exam is intended to measure. On the issue of mechanics and costs, CEUP recognized that USMLE must be very attentive to the burden put on examinees by this testing format and that the impact on examinees must be considered when proposing future directions. Concerning the skills measured by Step 2 CS, there seemed to be legitimate concerns about content. Many people wanted to see the exam begin to assess whether the examinee can detect and interpret abnormal findings and handle challenging communication issues. There was a frequently expressed sentiment that this exam was ripe for enhancement and that many of the more advanced communication skills and other competencies could be assessed through this vehicle." In response to the feedback gathered, the CEUP recommended that "the assessment of clinical skills remain a component of USMLE, but that USMLE consider ways to further enhance the testing methods currently used, in order to address additional skills im-portant to medical practice. It is also recommended that the administrative challenges and costs to examinees associated with related testing formats be given substantial weight in the consideration of future changes."

In 2013, an article published in the New England Journal of Medicine raised concerns about the value of the exam. The authors calculated that the test fee alone cost students $36 million annually, and that the cost of detecting a single student who failed the exam on back-to-back attempts was $1.1 million. A letter to the editor from the leadership of the NBME and the FSMB in response to the article highlighted the need to view the value of the Step 2 CS in terms other than just cost; specifically, they state that:

Although (the authors') interest in cost is consistent with the current climate in health care, the 'value' referenced in their title is a function of quality as well as cost. They fail to fully consider the long-term effect of this assessment program on patient safety and satisfaction, societal expectations, and effective medical education.

They also note that inclusion of Step 2 CS in the USMLE "brought the USMLE closer to meeting the expectations of the public that physicians exhibit competence in communicating with and examining patients."

In February 2016, a group of students at Harvard Medical School launched a national petition calling for an end to Step 2 CS. Since the petition opened, it has collected over 20,000 signatures from medical students and physicians from all over the country.

In May 2016, the Massachusetts Medical Society and the Michigan State Medical Society have passed resolutions calling for the elimination of Step 2 CS.

In June 2016, the Arizona Medical Association and the AMA - Medical Student Section passed resolutions also calling for the elimination of Step 2 CS. All four resolutions were introduced to the American Medical Association's 2016 Annual House of Delegates meeting, and were combined and adopted as a substitute, single resolution by a unanimous voice vote on 6/15/2016. The adopted language calls for the AMA to work with the FSMB, NBME, state medical societies, and state medical boards to pursue the transition from the Step 2 CS exam to a school-administered clinical skills exam as a licensure requirement.

March 16, 2020, USMLE cancelled all appointments for the USMLE Step 2 CS exam due to the COVID-19 pandemic. Scheduling functionality for the exam was also cancelled.

On May 26, 2020, USMLE has "decided to suspend Step 2 CS test administrations for the next 12-18 months."

The USMLE announced on January 26, 2021, that "[they] have decided to discontinue Step 2 CS."

=== Racial disparities ===
There have been racial differences in outcome associated with the use of USMLE Step 1 scores to grant residency interviews. A study conducted in 2020 showed differences in USMLE Step 1 scores attributable to race and ethnicity, with lower mean scores for self-identified Black, Asian, and Hispanic examinees when compared with self-identified White examinees. The mean effect was larger when comparing Caucasian applicants (223) with Black and Hispanic applicants (216). Depending on the threshold score, an African American was 3–6x less likely to be offered an interview." "61% of minority applicants were accepted into an orthopaedic residency versus 73% of White applicants. White and Asian applicants and residents had higher USMLE Step 1. White applicants and matriculated candidates had higher odds of Alpha Omega Alpha membership compared with Black, Hispanic, and other groups. In 2020, the American Academy of Family Physicians and the Association of American Medical Colleges expressed their support for changing Step 1 to pass or fail, in part to reduce racial bias.

=== Financial considerations ===
NBME and USMLE were met with criticism when they announced their raising cost for Step standardized tests. Kevin MD wrote, "Safeguards are needed to ensure fees for mandatory testing such as the USMLE do not exceed reasonable operating costs, particularly for financially vulnerable medical students." Registering for Step exams test cost between $645 and $985. The NBME executives received public criticism related to their increasing salaries. "Former NBME President Dr. Melnick's compensation increased from $399,160 in 2001 to over $1.2 million in 2016, almost in parallel with the tripling of USMLE costs." "According to the 2017 Form 990, Schedule J, two lower executives received total compensation over $700,000; another two over $600,000; another three receiving over $500,000, and another 6 receiving over $400,000."

The US Medical Licensing Examinations have received criticism due to their high cost. As of 2023, the USMLE charges (in U.S. dollars):

- $660 for Step 1 for US/Canada students (increasing to $670 in 2024), $1,000 for International medical graduates (IMGs)
- $660 for Step 2 CK for US/Canada students (increasing to $670 in 2024), $1,000 for IMGs
- $935 for Step 3 for all students

As part of a broader public plea for systemic changes to the improper use of USMLE exams, STAT wrote that this "multimillion-dollar industry has exploited the opportunity to extract thousands of dollars from already overly indebted students. Registering for Step exams test cost $645–1300, while Step preparation materials and courses run much higher."

=== Katsufrakis and Chaudhry comments ===
In December 2018, NBME President Peter Katsufrakis and FSMB President Humayun Chaudhry wrote in opposition of USMLE Step 1 changes in Improving Residency Selection Requires Close Study and Better Understanding of Stakeholder Needs: "If students reduce time and effort devoted to preparing for Step 1, they may indeed devote attention to other activities that will prepare them to be good physicians. This would arguably be an ideal outcome of such a change. However, if students were to devote more time to activities that make them less prepared to provide quality care, such as binge-watching the most recent Netflix series or compulsively updating their Instagram account, this could negatively impact residency performance and ultimately patient safety. We know that assessment drives learning, so another concern resulting from a shift to pass/fail scoring may be a less knowledgeable physician population."

This was met with significant backlash from students and the medical education community as this was felt to be a "tone-deaf assumption that medical trainees with more time may instead redirect their effort toward Netflix and Instagram." Within a few days, Katsufrakis and Chaudhry issued an apology and removed the phrase.

== See also ==
- COMLEX-USA, a test required for american osteopathic physicians
- Ärztliche Prüfungen, overseen by the IMPP, in Germany
- Australian Medical Council (AMC) examinations in Australia.
- Examen Nacional de Aspirantes a Residencias Médicas (ENARM) in Mexico
- Épreuves classantes nationales ECNi in France
- Hong Kong Medical Licensing Examination (HKMLE) in Hong Kong.
- Examination for Provisional Registration (EPR) in Malaysia.
- Medical Council of Canada Qualifying Examination, in Canada
- Pakistan Medical and Dental Council NEB and NLE Exam, Pakistan
- Medical Council of India (MCI-FMGE conducted by National Board of Examinations)
- National Eligibility and Entrance Test, India (UG and PG)
- Nepal Medical Council, in Nepal.
- National Examination for Medical Practitioners in Japan
- Professional and Linguistic Assessments Board test (similar exam used in United Kingdom)
- Saudi Medical Licensing Examination (SMLE) in Saudi Arabia
- Ujian Kompetensi Dokter Indonesia (UKDI) Indonesian Doctor Competence Examination, in Indonesia.
- Bahrain Medical Licensure Examination (BLME) in Bahrain.
- Kunskapsprov för läkare, overseen by Umeå University, in Sweden.
