= Accreditation Council for Graduate Medical Education =

American non-profit private council

- Founded: 1981
- Type: Non-profit
- Location: Chicago, Illinois, U.S.
- CEO: Debra Weinstein
- Chief Financial Officer: John Ogunkeye
- Chair of Board of Directors: Claudia J. Wyatt-Johnson
- Affiliations: American Board of Medical Specialties; American Hospital Association; American Medical Association; Association of American Medical Colleges; Council of Medical Specialty Societies; American Osteopathic Association; American Association of Colleges of Osteopathic Medicine
- Employees: 230
- Website: www.acgme.org

The Accreditation Council for Graduate Medical Education (ACGME) is the body responsible for accrediting all graduate medical training programs —internships, residencies, and fellowships (subspecialty programs)—for physicians in the United States. It is a non-profit private council that evaluates and accredits medical residency and internship programs.

== History ==
The ACGME was founded in 1981 and was preceded by the Liaison Committee for Graduate Medical Education, which was established in 1972. The ACGME currently oversees the post-graduate education and training for all MD and DO physicians in the United States.

The ACGME's member organizations are the American Board of Medical Specialties, American Hospital Association, American Medical Association, Association of American Medical Colleges, American Osteopathic Association (AOA), American Association of Colleges of Osteopathic Medicine (AACOM), and the Council of Medical Specialty Societies each of whom appoints members to the ACGME's board of directors.

In 2014, the ACGME, the American Osteopathic Association (AOA) and the American Association of Colleges of Osteopathic Medicine (AACOM) announced an agreement to pursue a single, unified accreditation system for graduate medical education programs in the United States beginning in 2015. Plans called for the ACGME to accredit all osteopathic graduate medical education programs, which went into effect on July 1, 2020.

== Projects ==
The Clinical Learning Environment Review project promotes patient safety, quality during changes in care, appropriate supervision of care, managing fatigue of residents, and increasing the professionalism of physicians.

From July 1, 2015, to June 30, 2020, the American Osteopathic Association (AOA), American Association of Colleges of Osteopathic Medicine (AACOM) and the Accreditation Council for Graduate Medical Education (ACGME) worked on a single accreditation system for all US residency programs. Before this date, only MD residencies were ACGME-accredited, while DO residencies were AOA-accredited.

=== Outcome Project ===
The Outcome Project began in 2001 with a set of assessments for measuring physician competence. By 2009, it was recognized that ACGME measurements could not reliably be evaluated independently of each other and instead should be used together and with other measurements.

The ACGME introduced milestones in internal medicine, pediatrics, and surgery for assessing progress of residents toward the six identified competencies. Milestones can be evaluated by numerous methods ranging from direct observation of clinical encounters to medical simulation.

== Awards ==
Awards handed out by the ACGME include the David C Leach award and Palmer award. Many of the awardees have notably earned multiple national level awards including both ACGME and American Medical Association award recognition.

== See also ==
- Comparison of MD and DO Residencies in the United States
- International Association of Medical Colleges
- Surgical Council on Resident Education
