= Association of Osteopathic Directors and Medical Educators =

American professional association

- Abbreviation: AODME
- Type: Professional association
- Headquarters: Chicago, IL
- Location: United States
- Official language: English
- President and CEO: Robert Cain DO, MPH, FAODME
- Website: www.aacom.org/aogme

The Association of Osteopathic Directors and Medical Educators (AODME) is a professional association of deans and presidents of osteopathic medical schools, residency program directors, and the leadership of the American Association of Colleges of Osteopathic Medicine (AACOM). The organization's headquarters are located in Chicago, Illinois. January 2018 marked the beginning of the integration of AODME within AACOM. The integration bridges the gap between undergraduate and graduate medical education (GME) by providing leadership for the full continuum of osteopathic medical education. As part of the integration AODME will be renamed as the Assembly of Osteopathic Graduate Medical Educators (AOGME).
