= COMLEX-USA =

Series of three osteopathic medical licensing

The Comprehensive Osteopathic Medical Licensing Examination of the United States (COMLEX-USA) is a three-step osteopathic medical licensing examination sponsored by the National Board of Osteopathic Medical Examiners (NBOME), similar to the United States Medical Licensing Examination (USMLE).

COMLEX-USA is the most common pathway by which individuals with a Doctor of Osteopathic Medicine degree apply for medical licensure, and is accepted in all 50 states. The 3-digit standard scores of COMLEX-USA Level 1, Level 2- Cognitive Evaluation (CE), and Level 3 have a range of 9-999 and a mean of 500. Most candidates score between 250 and 800. 400 is the minimum passing score for COMLEX-USA Levels 1 and 2; 350 for COMLEX-USA Level 3. It was announced on January 24, 2022, that the COMLEX-USA Level 1 examination will be moving from a 3-digit numeric score to solely pass/fail beginning on May 10, 2022.

== COMLEX-USA Level 1 ==
COMLEX-USA Level 1 is typically taken after completion of the second year of medical school. The exam consists of 352 questions administered in one day and consists of two, four-hour exam sessions separated by a 40-minute break. Each of the four-hour sessions allows a ten-minute break in addition to the time allotted for the respective four-hour sessions. Candidates are expected to know the basic mechanisms of health and disease process. The mean score for the COMLEX-USA Level 1 is approximately 500-540 (for first time test-takers), with a standard deviation of about 85 (although this may vary slightly from year to year). It was announced on January 24, 2022, that the COMLEX-USA Level 1 examination will be moving from a 3-digit numeric score to solely pass/fail beginning on May 10, 2022.

Specifically, Level 1 covers basic medical sciences, including:

- Anatomy
- Behavioral Science
- Biochemistry
- Microbiology
- Osteopathic Principles and Practice
- Pathology
- Pharmacology
- Physiology
- Public Health

== COMLEX-USA Level 2 CE ==
COMLEX-USA Level 2-Cognitive Evaluation (CE), is generally taken during the third or fourth year of medical school. Level 2-CE requires candidates to demonstrate knowledge of clinical concepts and medical decision-making. The mean score for the COMLEX-USA Level 2 CE is approximately 540 (for first time test-takers), with a standard deviation of about 100 (although this may vary slightly from year to year).

The examination is problem-based and symptoms-based, integrating the clinical disciplines of:

- emergency medicine
- family medicine
- internal medicine
- obstetrics/gynecology
- osteopathic principles
- pediatrics
- psychiatry
- surgery

== COMLEX-USA Level 2 PE (discontinued) ==
In 2005 the NBOME introduced the COMLEX-USA Level 2-Performance Evaluation (PE). It was announced on February 14, 2021, that the COMLEX-USA Level 2-PE examination will be discontinued indefinitely and a commission will be set up "to consider and identify new ways to evaluate fundamental competencies currently assessed in the Level 2-PE." The exam was a one-day, seven-hour clinical skills examination and utilized standardized patients (actors trained to present clinical symptoms) to test clinical skills. The exam was graded as pass/fail. Testing sites were available in Conshohocken, PA, and in Chicago, IL. Candidates were required to complete 12 standardized patient encounters, each 14 minutes in duration. Following each encounter, candidates had 9 minutes to type a SOAP note. Candidates were strongly encouraged to make full use of the allotted time for each encounter to ensure thoroughness in both components of an encounter.

The exam required candidates to demonstrate proficiency in:

- history taking and physical examination skills
- integrated differential diagnosis and clinical problem solving
- written communication and synthesis of clinical findings (SOAP note format)
- osteopathic principles and/or osteopathic manipulative treatment

== COMLEX-USA Level 3 ==
The final examination, COMLEX-USA Level 3, is generally taken after starting a residency program. The exam is a two-day computer-based examination consisting of up to 420 multiple choice questions, and up to 26 additional clinical decision-making cases. The mean score for COMLEX-USA Level 3 is approximately 520 (for first-time test takers), with a standard deviation of about 85.

It covers the clinical disciplines of medicine, including:

- emergency medicine
- family medicine
- internal medicine
- obstetrics/gynecology
- osteopathic principles
- pediatrics
- psychiatry
- surgery

== USMLE comparison ==
In 2020, the ACGME (former MD residency system) and AOA GME (former DO residency system) merged and became one GME. All allopathic and osteopathic medical students, therefore, now apply to and train in ACGME-accredited residencies. Prior to the merger, DO students could apply to both ACGME and AOA residencies, while MD students could only apply to ACGME residencies. Although not a requirement, to be competitive, many osteopathic medical students have a pressure to take both USMLE and COMLEX. There are several residency programs that specifically require USMLE scores. Based on data from recent results of the COMLEX-USA examination, for level 1 and level 2, a score of 500-540 is considered the 50th percentile with scores falling slightly under and over this mark to be considered similarly. A score of 600 is historically considered to be around the 80th percentile.
