= Nevada State Board of Medical Examiners =

State agency in Nevada, United States

The Nevada State Board of Medical Examiners is a state agency of Nevada that regulates and administers licenses to physicians, practitioners of respiratory care, physician assistants, and perfusionists who wish to practice in Nevada. The agency is headed by a board, with its current president being Rachakonda D. Prabhu. The Nevada State Board of Medical Examiners is headquartered in Reno, Nevada. It is a member of the Federation of State Medical Boards.

== History ==
The Nevada State Board of Medical Examiners was first formed in 1975 for the purpose of ensuring that the health practitioners practicing in the state are licensed to do so and to provide a judicial process in the event of medical malpractice. When this law was passed, the board was only responsible for the licensing of physicians and physicians' assistants. Only in 2001 was the board granted the ability to license and oversee practitioners of respiratory care, and in 2009 the board was also granted the authority to license and oversee perfusionists.

== Structure ==
The Board of Medical Examiners that leads the agency consists of nine members, all selected by the Governor of Nevada. Every member must be a resident of Nevada, and at least six of the members must have a license to practice medicine in Nevada, with at least five years of experience practicing in the state. Members of the board can serve for a maximum of two full terms, with each term spanning a four-year period.

Aside from the board of medical examiners, the agency also has three active advisory committees: Physician Assistant Advisory Committee, Practitioner of Respiratory Care Advisory Committee, and Perfusionist Advisory Committee.
