= Maya Hammoud =

Lebanese-American physician

Maya M. Hammoud
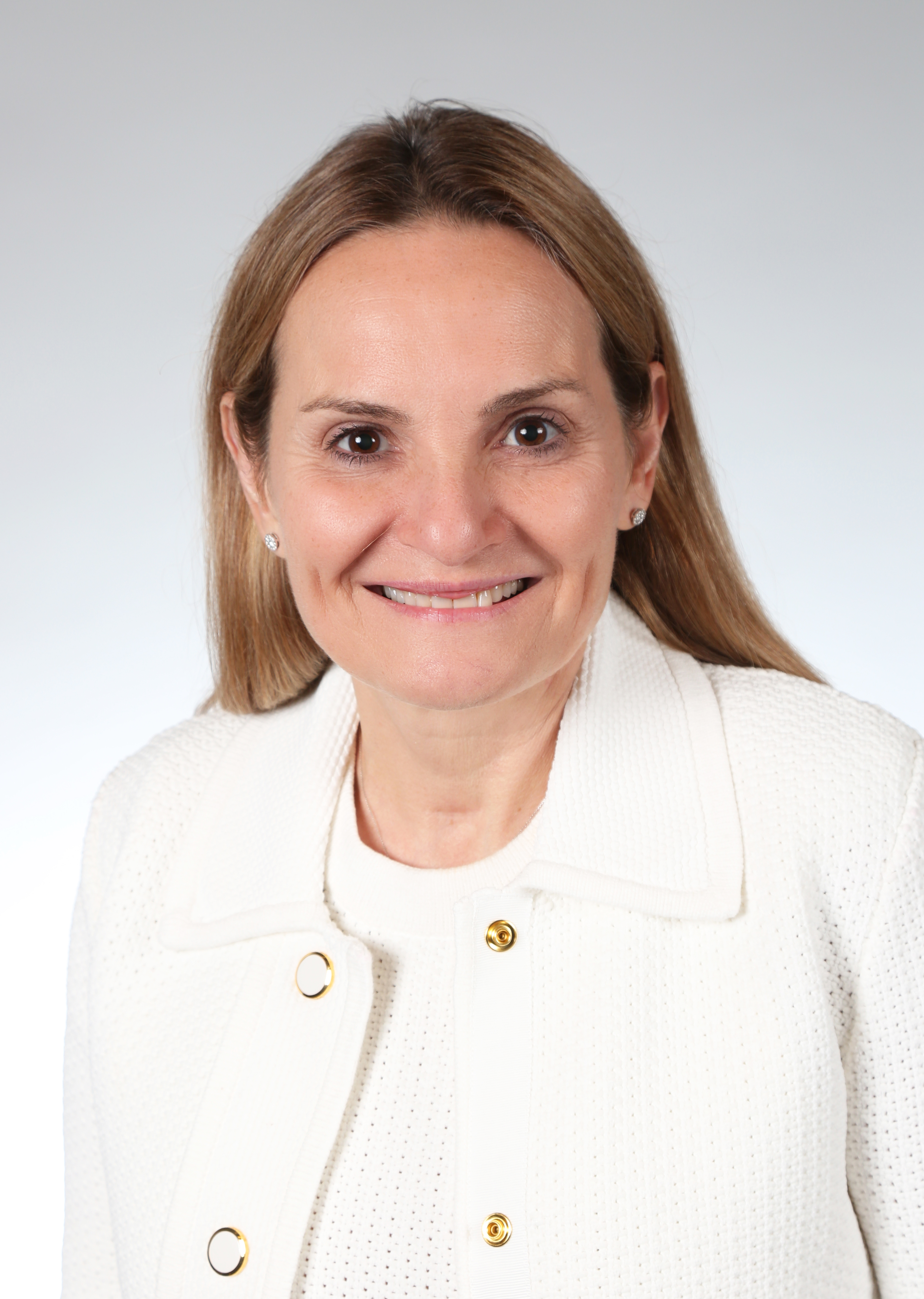
- Born: Lebanon
- Citizenship: American
- Occupations: Obstetrician-gynecologist, medical educator

Maya M. Hammoud is a Lebanese-American physician who is a professor of obstetrics-gynecology and Learning Health Sciences at the University of Michigan Medicine. She is known for her leadership in medical education, particularly her work in reforming the residency application and selection process in the United States.

== Early life and education ==
Hammoud was born in Lebanon and immigrated to the United States at the age of 17. She worked at a Kmart cafeteria and helped out at her father’s gas station while she pursued her education. Hammoud has a bachelor’s degree in biochemistry with minors in French and psychology, an MD, and an MBA, all from the University of Michigan.

== Career ==
Hammoud has been on the faculty at the University of Michigan since 2000 and was promoted to a full professor in 2014. She was also faculty at Weill Cornell Medical College-Qatar from 2006–2009 where she first served as Associate Dean for Student Affairs and was then promoted to Senior Associate Dean for Education. She has been the senior adviser for medical education innovations at the American Medical Association (AMA) since 2016 and the J. Robert Willson Research Professor of Obstetrics and Gynecology at the University of Michigan Medical School since 2020. In 2018, she became the first Muslim president of the Association of Professors of Gynecology and Obstetrics. She was also a member of the Board of Directors of the National Board of Medical Examiners (NBME) from 2021–2025.

Hammoud has played a central role in reforms to the U.S. residency application system and has advocated for holistic review, implicit bias training, and equity in residency selection. She is the principal investigator of an AMA “Reimagining Residency” $1.75 million grant focused on improving the transition from undergraduate to graduate medical education for OBGYN. She helped develop the Alignment Check Index within FRIEDA AMA Residency & Fellowship Programs Database to improve alignment between applicants and residency programs. She was a key player in developing ResidencyCAS, a novel residency application system for OBGYN outside of the Electronic Residency Application Service (ERAS), which was also later adopted by emergency medicine.

As senior adviser for medical education innovations at the AMA, she has played a significant role in establishing health systems science as a key part of medical education and building academic coaching programs. She launched and directed the Health Systems Science (HSS) Academy from 2016 to 2022 and created the annual AMA Academic Coaching Implementation workshop. This was launched in 2019 and is ongoing.

Her scholarship includes over 100 peer-reviewed publications, as well as co-editing several books on health systems science and coaching.

== Awards and recognition ==
- Arab American and Chaldean Council's Excellence in Health Care Award (2005)
- AMA Women Physicians Section Inspiration Award (2019)
- 2020 Crain’s 2020 Notable Women in Health

== Selected publications ==
- Wolff M, University of Michigan Medical School, Jackson J, University of Michigan Medical School, Hammoud M, University of Michigan Medical School and American Medical Association (2019). It Takes Two: A Guide to Being a Good Coachee. Chicago, IL: American Medical Association.
- "The Master Adaptive Learner – 9780323711111". US Elsevier Health.
- Skochelak, Susan E.; Hammoud, Maya M.; Lomis, Kimberly D. (2020-05-19). Health Systems Science. Elsevier. ISBN 978-0-323-69462-9.
- "Value-Added Roles for Medical Students - 9780323759502". MEA Elsevier Health.
- "Coaching in Medical Education – 9780323847261". US Elsevier Health.
- "Health Systems Science Education: Development an – 9780443110962". US Elsevier Health.
