= USMLE score =

American medical licensing score

The United States Medical Licensing Examination score (USMLE score) is given to test takers as a 3-digit score. This score is commonly used by hospitals to determine eligibility for residency and fellowship. The three-digit score is based on a theoretical maximum of 300, but this has not been documented by the NBME / FSMB. Previously, a 2 digit score was also provided, but has since been eliminated. The two-digit score was normalized to the three-digit score such that a 75 was equal to the minimum passing score (currently 194) for the USMLE Step 1. Contrary to popular opinion, the two-digit score does not represent a percentile.

== Three-digit USMLE score ==
The NBME / FSMB have never clearly stated that the three-digit score is based on an absolute scale with a maximum of 300. However, this is the assumption stated by NBME with regard to their Comprehensive Basic Science Self-Assessment (CBSSA). The minimum passing level for the three-digit score is 194 effective since January 1, 2018 The average score varies by year and tends to be near 230.

== Two-digit USMLE score ==
The two-digit scoring system has been deleted from USMLE Transcripts effective from April, 2013.

== USMLE score calculator ==
There are a number of score calculators and converters available for the USMLE. A free calculator and converter is available at https://usmle-score-correlation.blogspot.com/ and permits the conversion between the three-digit score and two-digit score.
