= National Board of Medical Examiners =

Medical accreditation board

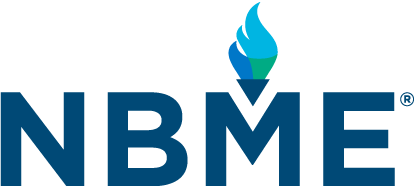

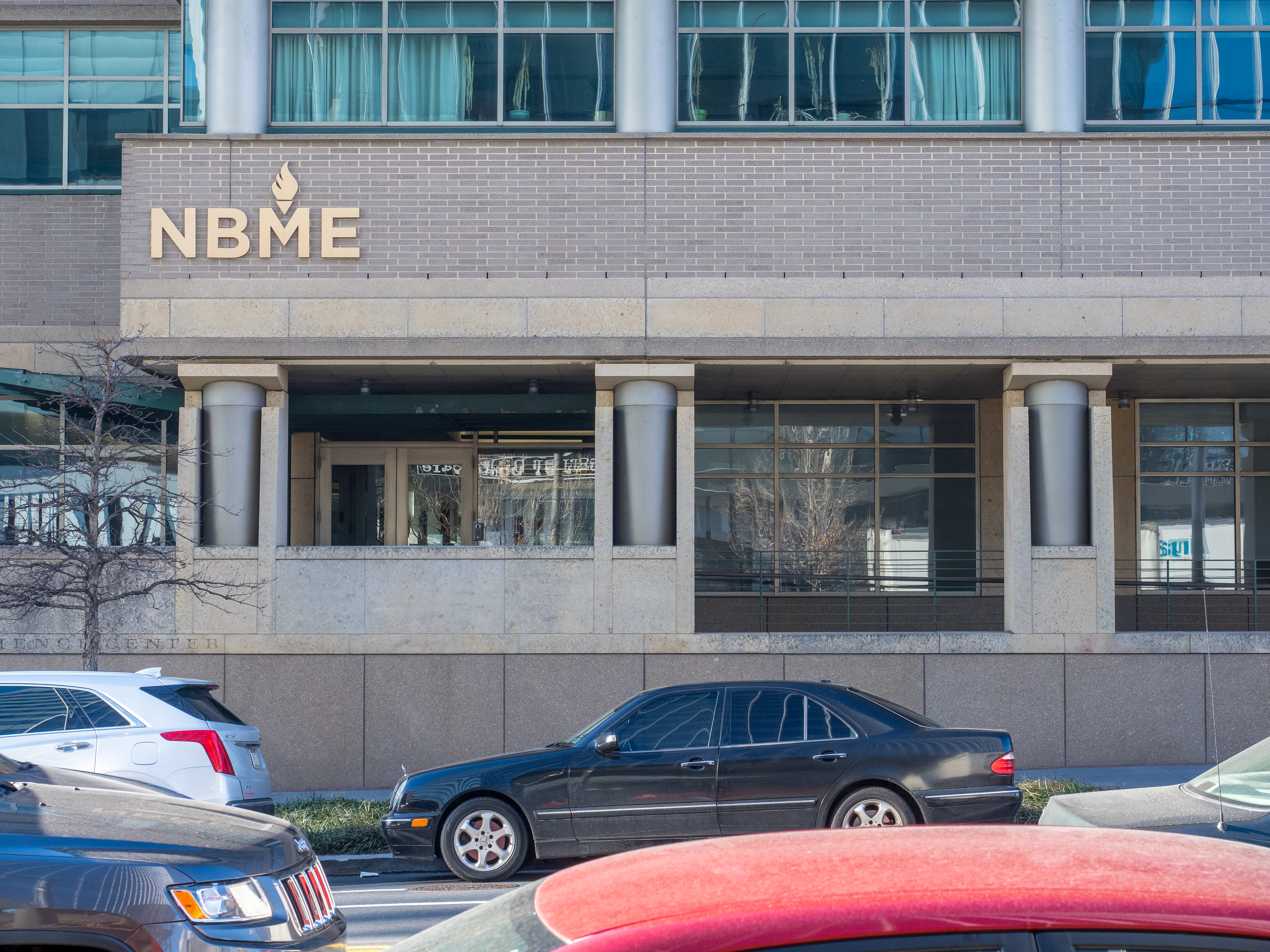
- Founded: 1915; 111 years ago
- Type: Nonprofit educational
- Location: 3750 Market Street, Philadelphia, Pennsylvania, U.S. (headquarters)
- President & CEO: Peter J. Katsufrakis, MD, MBA
- Website: nbme.org

The National Board of Medical Examiners (NBME), founded in 1915, is a United States non-profit which develops and manages assessments of student physicians. Known for its role in developing the United States Medical Licensing Examination (USMLE) in partnership with the Federation of State Medical Boards (FSMB), USMLE examinations for medical students and residents are used by medical licensing authorities in the U.S. to help determine qualifications to grant and recognize medical licenses. NBME also creates assessments and materials that are used by medical students, medical educators, practicing physicians, and for state testing of physicians already holding licenses.

NBME's stated mission is to "protect the health of the public through state of the art assessment of health professionals" and emphasizes that "while NBME's mission is centered on assessment of physicians, this mission encompasses the spectrum of health professionals along the continuum of education, training and practice and includes research in evaluation as well as development of assessment instruments". NBME is headquartered on and adjacent to the University City Science Center research campus in Philadelphia, Pennsylvania.

== History ==
The NBME was founded in Philadelphia in 1915, with the goal of creating a voluntary medical licensing exam that would be accepted by U.S. states and territories in lieu of their own exams, allowing physicians to practice across state lines. Use of NBME Certifying Examinations ("Part" exams) grew in the years following its founding and in the years leading up to World War II. Prior to the war, states still administered their own exams, and operated agreements to license doctors passed by other state exams through membership in the Federation of State Medical Boards (FSMB). But by 1943, 45 of the 48 states accepted NBME exams for licensure along with their state exams. After the war, states continued to use the results of an NBME exam to decide whether to award medical licenses. This system meant students from different states would sit the same exam. By 1992, 49 of the 50 US states accepted NBME exams for licensure along with their state exams.

The United States Medical Licensing Examination (USMLE), introduced in 1992, is a multi-part professional exam sponsored by the Federation of State Medical Boards (FSMB) and NBME. Medical students attending U.S. institutions are required to pass USMLE Step 1 and USMLE Step 2 Clinical Knowledge to enter into residency training where they treat patients under supervision. Graduates of international medical schools seeking a medical residency in the United States generally take Step 1 and Step 2 CK after obtaining an MD or equivalent degree. USMLE Step 3 must be passed before a Doctor of Medicine can apply to obtain a license to practice unsupervised medicine in the United States. Because medical licenses are awarded by states, the process can vary depending on the state in which an MD or DO holder is seeking licensure. Some states cap the number times the USMLE Step exams can be taken or provide a time limit for completing the sequence of licensing exams.

In 2020, some members of the medical community questioned NBME's decision not to accelerate USMLE Step 1 score reporting to pass/fail, which was not changed before 2022.

To assist examinees, NBME maintains a web portal that provides access to self-assessment test forms to help medical students practice for upcoming exams such as the USMLE Step 1, USMLE Step 2 CK, NBME Subject Exams, and the International Foundations of Medicine (IFOM) exams. Beginning in 2021, most self-assessments became available in test forms that provide detailed answer explanations for both correct and incorrect answers. As of March 24, 2021, NBME assessment form numbers 25, 26, 27, 28, 29, and 30 replaced retired form numbers 18 through 24.

=== Other NBME Exams Used in Medical Education ===
- Health Systems Science Exam - developed in cooperation with and at the request of the American Medical Association, the HSS exam measures a physicians knowledge of healthcare economics.
- Basic Science and Clinical Science Exams
- Advanced Clinical Exams
- Comprehensive Exams

== Current Leadership (as of 2021) ==
- President – Dr. Peter Katsufrakis
- Chair – Dr. Alfred F. Tallia
- Vice chair – Dr. Latha Chandran
- Treasurer – Dr. Reena Karani
- Executive Board – Suzanne Anderson, Maya Hammoud, Kamili Wilson, Dr. Marie Foley, Dr. David Milling, Dr. Karen Sanders, Dr. Danny M. Takanishi, Jr., and Zach Weismann

== Controversies ==
Beginning mid-March 2020, testing centers operated by Prometric were closed based on local health and safety guidelines due to the COVID-19 pandemic. Prometric center administrations for NBME-developed assessments such as USMLE, Health Professionals, and NBME Subject Examinations were suspended completely for several months. USMLE waived fees associated with extending testing eligibility periods and changing testing locations. Prometric resumed test administration for "essential services" clients at reduced capacity, which included NBME assessments, in May 2020. The medical community criticized Prometric for the mishandling of testing centers operations during the pandemic, creating "chaos", further "disadvantages", "harm", "bias" and "inequity". Prometric issued an apology to NBME for mishandling communication with students around exam scheduling during the pandemic.

== See also ==
- National Board of Osteopathic Medical Examiners
- United States Medical Licensing Examination
