= Prometric =

Test administration company

- Type: Public
- Founded: 1990; 36 years ago
- Headquarters: Baltimore, Maryland, United States
- Key people: Stuart J. Udell (CEO)
- Parent: EQT Private Capital Asia
- Website: prometric.com

Prometric, also known as Prometric Testing, is an American test administration company. The corporate headquarters are located in Baltimore, Maryland, United States. The company manages a network of test centers with thousands of sites in 160 countries, where various examinations are conducted.

== History ==
Prometric's computerized testing centers were founded by Drake International in 1990 under the name Drake Prometric. In 1995, Drake Prometric L.P. was sold to Sylvan Learning in a cash and stock deal worth approximately $44.5 million. The acquired business was renamed Sylvan Prometric and then sold to Thomson Corporation in 2000. The Thomson Corporation announced its desire to sell Prometric in the fall of 2006, and the Educational Testing Service announced plans to acquire it. On Monday, October 15, 2007, the Educational Testing Service (ETS) closed its acquisition of Prometric from the Thomson Corporation. In 2018, Prometric was bought by Baring Private Equity Asia.

Prometric co-sponsored the 10th Annual International Conference on Medical Regulation, which took place at the Ottawa Convention Centre in Ontario, Canada, in October 2012.

During Prometric's first administration of the LSAT (Law School Admission Test) in August 2023, many test takers, especially remote test takers, faced issues and interruptions during the exam. Due to issues with administering the exam, some individuals were unable to begin. The same technical issues were unresolved by the time registration for the September 2023 LSAT arrived, with many test takers experiencing the same technical difficulties.

== Executive Leadership ==
In 2017, Charles Kernan was appointed as president and CEO of Prometric, replacing Michael Brannick. Brannick had held the position since 2001.

In September 2019, Roy Simrell joined Prometric as president and CEO, taking over for Kernan.

In April 2021, Prometric appointed Oliver Chang as chief technical officer. In June 2022, Prometric appointed Nikki Eatchel as chief assessment officer.

In February 2023, Prometric appointed Stuart Udell as its current CEO, taking over from Simrell.

== Business ==
Prometric offers a range of services, including test development, test delivery, and data management capabilities. Prometric delivers and administers tests to approximately 500 clients in the academic, professional, government, corporate and information technology markets. While there are 3,000 Prometric test centers across the world, including every U.S. state and territory (except Wake Island), whether a particular test can be taken outside the U.S. depends on the testing provider. For example, despite the fact that Prometric test centers exist worldwide, some exams are offered only in the country where the client program is located. The locations where a test is offered, as well as specific testing procedures for the day of the exam, are dictated by the client.

In the Republic of Ireland, Prometric's local subsidiary is responsible for administering the Driver Theory Test.

In April 2021, the Canadian affiliate of Prometric acquired Paragon Testing Enterprises from the University of British Columbia.

In August 2022, Prometric acquired Finetune, an AI-assisted assessment and learning technology tool.

== Contracts ==
In 2011, Prometric lost the contract to conduct the Oracle certification exam and was replaced by Pearson VUE.

In 2014, the IBM Professional Certification Program exam delivery was moved from Prometric to Pearson VUE Test Centers. In 2014, Prometric lost the bid to conduct it for the second time to an Indian tech firm.

In 2014, Microsoft ended its exam partnership with Prometric.

In 2017, Prometric lost the contract to conduct the Medical College Admission Test (MCAT). They were replaced with Pearson VUE.

In 2019, the Project Management Institute (PMI) ended its exam partnership with Prometric. They were replaced with Pearson VUE.

In January 2023, Prometric renewed its partnership with CFA Institute for a multi-year deal.

== Controversies and Legal Issues ==
Prometric has faced criticism from many test takers for its lack of accountability and mismanagement.

In 2009, the company faced a hurdle due to widespread technical problems with one of India's MBA entrance exams, the Common Admission Test. Over 8000 test takers were affected.

In 2014, a latency issue affected one Prometric-administered test, namely the AIPGMEE.

In 2020, as a result of COVID-19, Prometric cancelled exams, including the United States Medical Licensing Examinations (USMLE) and the Comprehensive Osteopathic Medical Licensing Examination (COMLEX), in compliance with local and national regulations.

In 2021, an exam proctor noticed that Somali-speaking examinees were failing the Washington-state Certified Nursing Assistant licensing exam at a disproportionately high rate. The overall pass rate for this exam was 97.1%, while examinees using the Somali version had a pass rate of 23.1%. When the proctor raised this concern, Prometric informed him that an investigation would not occur due to the high costs. A Prometric spokesman later justified this decision by saying, "The low pass rates should be attributed to the Somalis' literacy rates among native speakers, and their proficiency with technology.” After the proctor escalated the issue to the Washington State Board of Health, Prometric terminated him. Prometric was ultimately forced to re-translate the exam after the former proctor challenged them in court and pay an undisclosed amount for violating labor laws.
