= National Board of Osteopathic Medical Examiners =

National Osteopathic Board of Medical Examiners
- Abbreviation: NBOME
- Formation: 1934
- Type: Professional association
- Headquarters: Chicago, IL
- Location: United States
- Official language: English
- President: John R. Gimpel, DO, M.Ed., FACOFP, FAAFP
- Website: nbome.org
- Formerly called: National Osteopathic Board of Examiners for Osteopathic Physicians and Surgeons, Inc.

The National Board of Osteopathic Medical Examiners (NBOME), founded in 1934 as the National Osteopathic Board of Examiners for Osteopathic Physicians and Surgeons, Inc., is a United States examination board which sets state recognized examinations for osteopathic medical students and began administering exams in February 1935. The NBOME is an independent, nonprofit organization and is headquartered in Chicago, Illinois and Conshohocken, Pennsylvania. The NBOME states that its mission is "to protect the public by providing the means to assess competencies for osteopathic medicine and related health care professions." The NBOME conducts research to monitor the quality of the COMLEX examinations.

The Comprehensive Osteopathic Medical Licensing Examination (COMLEX) is a multi-part professional examination and must be passed successfully before a Doctor of Osteopathic Medicine (D.O.) can obtain a license to practice medicine in the United States.

== History ==
In 1987, the name was changed from National Osteopathic Board of Examiners for Osteopathic Physicians and Surgeons, Inc. to the National Board of Osteopathic Medical Examiners, Inc.

The NBOME began administering the COMLEX Level 1 in 1998; COMLEX Level 2 in 1997, and COMLEX Level 3 in 1995. The NBOME transitioned to computer-based versions of the COMLEX Level 2 in July, 2005; COMLEX Level 3 in September, 2005 and COMLEX Level 1 in May, 2006.

The NBOME co-sponsored the 10th Annual International Conference on Medical Regulation, which took place at the Ottawa Convention Centre in Ontario, Canada in October 2012.

== See also ==
- National Board of Medical Examiners
- Comprehensive Osteopathic Medical Licensing Examination
