= American Association of Colleges of Osteopathic Medicine =

- Abbreviation: AACOM
- Formation: 1898
- Type: Professional association
- Headquarters: Bethesda, MD
- Location: United States
- Official language: English
- President/Chief Executive Officer: Robert Cain, DO
- Website: aacom.org

The American Association of Colleges of Osteopathic Medicine (AACOM) is a non-profit organization that supports the 48 accredited colleges of osteopathic medicine (COMs) in the United States. These colleges are accredited to deliver instruction at 75 teaching locations in 36 states. In the current academic year, these colleges are educating more than 38,000 future physicians—close to 30 percent of all U.S. medical students. Eight of the colleges are public, and 39 are private institutions.

AACOM serves as a unifying voice for osteopathic medical education (OME), fostering collaboration among its member institutions, and is active in advocacy at the federal government level. The Association is governed by its Board of Deans and led by President Robert A. Cain, DO.

AACOM often collaborates with other allied organizations and promotes public awareness for osteopathic medicine and OME. The association provides centralized services to its members, including data collection and analysis, and operation of its online application service, AACOMAS, for prospective students applying to U.S. osteopathic medical schools.

== Mission ==
AACOM provides leadership for the osteopathic medical education community by promoting excellence in medical education, research, and service, and by fostering innovation and quality across the continuum of osteopathic medical education to improve the health of the American public.

== History ==
Osteopathic medicine was founded in the late 1800s in Kirksville, Missouri, by Andrew Taylor Still, MD, DO, a medical doctor who recognized that the medical practices of the day often caused more harm than good. He focused on developing a system of medical care that would promote the body's innate ability to heal itself and called this system of medicine osteopathy, now known as osteopathic medicine.

In 2012, AACOM worked with the Association of American Medical Colleges to improve medical education on post-traumatic stress disorder and traumatic brain injuries.

Osteopathic physicians, also known as DOs, work in partnership with their patients. They consider the impact of lifestyle and community on each individual's health, and they work to break down barriers to good health. DOs are licensed to practice the full scope of medicine in all 50 states. They practice in all types of environments, including the military, and in all types of specialties, from family medicine to obstetrics, surgery, and aerospace medicine.

== Publications ==
AACOM publishes the Student Guide to Osteopathic Medical Colleges annually and Inside OME, a biweekly e-newsletter covering news related to osteopathic medicine and OME, legislation, updates on the transition to a single graduate medical education (GME) system, and more. AACOM also publishes several reports throughout the year, which focus on original research and data in OME.

== AACOM Councils ==
Created by the AACOM Board of Deans, AACOM councils support the work of the Association on behalf of all member colleges. Councils typically meet twice a year and collaborate regularly through the AACOMmunities online forum. AACOM also hosts online discussions for a wide variety of ad hoc committees and other interest groups in AACOMmunities.

== Programs and initiatives ==
AACOM also sponsors or co-sponsors a variety of programs and initiatives for audiences at every level of osteopathic medical education, from students to senior administrators. AACOM also offers opportunities for both medical students and health care professionals, including scholarships, internships, fellowships, and grants.

== See also ==
- Association of Osteopathic Directors and Medical Educators
- List of medical specialty colleges in the United States
