= Doctor of Osteopathic Medicine =

Postgraduate medical degree

Doctor of Osteopathic Medicine (DO or D.O., or in Australia DO USA) is a medical degree conferred by the 44 osteopathic medical schools in the United States, operating at 71 teaching locations across 36 states. As of 2026, nearly 30% of all U.S. medical students are earning a DO degree, and over 11% of all practicing U.S. physicians hold the DO degree. The curricula at DO-granting medical schools are equivalent to those at MD-granting medical schools, which focus the first two years on the biomedical and clinical sciences, then two years on core clinical training in the clinical specialties.

One notable difference between DO and MD training is that DOs spend an additional 300–500 hours to study pseudoscientific hands-on manipulation of the human musculoskeletal system (osteopathic manipulative technique) alongside conventional evidence-based medicine and surgery like their MD peers. However, most DOs do not practice this manipulation. Upon completing medical school, a DO graduate can enter an internship or residency training program, which may be followed by fellowship training. DO graduates attend the same graduate medical education programs as their MD counterparts.

== History ==
Osteopathy, the older form of osteopathic medicine, began in the United States in 1874. The term "osteopathy" was coined by the physician and surgeon Andrew Taylor Still, who named his new discipline of medicine "osteopathy", reasoning that "the bone, osteon, was the starting point from which [he] was to ascertain the cause of pathological conditions". He founded the American School of Osteopathy (now A.T. Still University of the Health Sciences) in Kirksville, Missouri, for the teaching of osteopathy on May 10, 1892. While the state of Missouri granted the right to award the MD degree, he remained dissatisfied with the limitations of conventional medicine and instead chose to retain the distinction of the DO degree. In 1898 the American Institute of Osteopathy started the Journal of Osteopathy (presently known as the Journal of Osteopathic Medicine) and by that time four states recognized the profession.

The osteopathic medical profession has evolved into two branches: non-physician manual medicine osteopaths, who were educated and trained outside the United States; and US-trained osteopathic physicians, who conduct a full scope of medical and surgical practice. The regulation of non-physician manual medicine osteopaths varies greatly between jurisdictions. In the United States, osteopathic physicians holding the DO degree have the same rights, privileges, and responsibilities as physicians with a Doctor of Medicine (MD) degree. Osteopathic physicians and non-physician osteopaths are so distinct that in practice they function as separate professions.

As originally conceived by Andrew Still, the letters "DO" stood for "Diplomate in Osteopathy" and the title conferred by the degree was "Doctor of Osteopathy". Subsequently, the degree also came to be entitled "Doctor of Osteopathic Medicine". Since the late 20th century, the AOA has preferred that this title be used exclusively. Its members resolved at a 1960 conference:

Be it resolved, that the American Osteopathic Association institute a policy, both officially in our publications and individually on a conversational basis, to use the terms osteopathic medicine in place of the word osteopathy and osteopathic physician and surgeon in place of osteopath; the words osteopathy and osteopath being reserved for historical, sentimental, and informal discussions only.

A minority of DOs continue to use the old terms, and the American Academy of Osteopathy retains the old usage in its name.

== Research ==
In 2026, the American Association of Colleges of Osteopathic Medicine published the first national analysis of research activities across colleges of osteopathic medicine (COMs). The report, Research at Colleges of Osteopathic Medicine: Inventory, Analysis and Future Directions, highlighted the rapid growth of community‑centered, clinically relevant research and identified opportunities to increase federal funding and collaboration.

== Demographics ==
In 2018, there were 114,425 osteopathic medical doctors in the United States and 145,343 total DOs and osteopathic medical students. The proportion of females in the profession has steadily increased since the 1980s. In 1985, about 10 percent of DO physicians were female, compared with 41 percent in 2018. Between 2008 and 2012, 49 percent of new DO graduates were females.

During the 2011–12 academic year, the osteopathic medical student body consisted of: 69 percent white/non-Hispanic, 19 percent Asian or Pacific Islander, 3.5 percent Hispanic, 3 percent African-American, and 0.5 percent Native American or Alaskan. The remainder were listed as "other or not entered". The five-year change in osteopathic medical student enrollment by ethnicity has increased by 19 percent for white/non-Hispanic students, 36 percent for Asian-American students, 24 percent for Black/African American students, and 60 percent for Hispanic/Latino students.

== Education, training and distinctiveness ==
Osteopathic medical school curricula are equivalent to those at schools granting the MD degree. Both US-granted MD and US-granted DO programs are listed in the World Directory of Medical Schools as medical schools. Furthermore, the accreditation agencies for both degrees, LCME and COCA for MD and DO, respectively, are recognized by the World Federation for Medical Education (WFME). Per WFME, "Recognition Status is awarded by WFME to an accrediting agency working to an internationally accepted high standard, and confers the understanding that the quality of accreditation of undergraduate medical schools is to an appropriate and rigorous standard." Once admitted to an osteopathic medical school, students study for four years to graduate. The schooling is divided into the pre-clinical and clinical years. The pre-clinical years, the first and second years, focus on the biomedical and clinical sciences. The clinical years, the third and fourth years, consist of core clinical training and sub-internships in the clinical specialties.

Osteopathic medical school accreditation standards require training in internal medicine, obstetrics/gynecology, pediatrics, family medicine, surgery, psychiatry, emergency medicine, radiology, preventive medicine, and public health. According to Harrison's Principles of Internal Medicine, "the training, practice, credentialing, licensure, and reimbursement of osteopathic physicians is virtually indistinguishable from those of physicians with MD qualifications, with 4 years of osteopathic medical school followed by specialty and subspecialty training and board certification".

DO schools provide an additional 300–500 hours in the study of hands-on manual medicine and the body's musculoskeletal system, which is referred to as osteopathic manipulative medicine (OMM). Osteopathic manipulation is a pseudoscience.

Before entering osteopathic medical school, an applicant must complete a four-year undergraduate degree and take a national standardized exam called the Medical College Admissions Test (MCAT). Some combined undergraduate/medical programs exist. Some authors note the differences in the average MCAT scores and grade point average of students who matriculate at DO schools compared to those who matriculate at MD schools within the United States. In 2021, the average MCAT and GPA for students entering US-based MD programs were 511.5 and 3.73, respectively, and 504.0 and 3.55 for DO matriculants. DO medical schools are more likely to accept non-traditional students, who are older and entering medicine as a second career, or coming from non-science majors.

DO medical students are required to take the Comprehensive Osteopathic Medical Licensure Examination (COMLEX-USA), which is sponsored by the National Board of Osteopathic Medical Examiners (NBOME). The COMLEX-USA is a series of three osteopathic medical licensing examinations. The first two Cognitive Evaluations (CEs) of the COMLEX-USA (Level 1 and Level 2) are taken during medical school and are prerequisites for residency programs, consisting of 352 multiple-choice questions (items) each. Finally, COMLEX Level 3 is usually taken during the first year of residency, and consists of 420 multiple-choice questions and 26 Clinical Decision-Making (CDM) cases.

In addition to the COMLEX-USA, DO medical students may choose to sit for United States Medical Licensing Examination (USMLE), which is sponsored by the National Board of Medical Examiners (NBME). This is typically done under specific circumstances, such as when the student desires to enter a residency that may have a historic preference for the USMLE, or if a higher USMLE score would help elevate the student's application to be more competitive. USMLE pass rates for DO and MD students in 2012 are as follows: Step 1: 91% and 94%, Step 2 CK: 96% and 97%, and Step 2 CS: 87% and 97%, respectively (this number may be misleading as only 46 DO students compared to 17,118 MD students were evaluated for Step 2 CS) Step 3: 100% and 95% (this number may be misleading, as only 16 DO students compared to 19,056 MD students, were evaluated for Step 3).

== Licensing and board certification ==
To obtain a license to practice medicine in the United States, osteopathic medical students must pass the Comprehensive Osteopathic Medical Licensing Examination (COMLEX), the licensure exam administered by the National Board of Osteopathic Medical Examiners throughout their medical training. Students are given the option of also taking the United States Medical Licensing Examination (USMLE) to apply for certain residency programs that may want USMLE scores in addition to COMLEX scores. Those that have received or are in the process of earning an MD or DO degree are both eligible to sit for the USMLE. Because of their additional training, only DO candidates are eligible to sit for the COMLEX.

In February 2014, the American Osteopathic Association and the Accreditation Council for Graduate Medical Education agreed to unify standard and osteopathic graduate medical education starting in 2020. Before 2020, DOs had the option to attend ACGME residencies or AOA residencies. From 2020, DOs and MDs attend the same ACGME residencies. Upon completion of internship and residency requirements for their chosen medical specialty, holders of the DO may elect to be board certified by either a specialty board (through the American Medical Association's American Board of Medical Specialties) or an osteopathic specialty board (through the American Osteopathic Association Bureau of Osteopathic Specialists certifying boards) or both.

Depending on the state, medical licensure may be issued from a combined board (DO and MD) or a separate board of medical examiners. All of the 70 state medical boards are members of the Federation of State Medical Boards.

Both "DOs and MDs require rigorous study in the field of medicine", with similar entry requirements and curriculum structures that are "largely the same," and both produce graduates who are licensed and accredited as physicians in the United States. Retired US Air Force flight surgeon and MD Harriet Hall, one of the five founding editors of Science-Based Medicine, has written that US Doctors of Osteopathic Medicine "must be distinguished from 'osteopaths', members of a less regulated or unregulated profession that is practiced in many countries" as "[o]steopaths get inferior training" that is not comparable to that undertaken by DOs.

== International variations ==
Currently, there are no osteopathic medical programs located outside of the United States that would qualify an individual to practice as an osteopathic physician in the United States. Foreign osteopathic degrees are not recognized by any state in the US or any region else as being equivalent to American DO degrees.

=== International practice rights ===
The International Labour Organization (ILO), an agency of the United Nations, issued a letter affirming that US-trained osteopathic physicians are fully licensed physicians who prescribe medication and perform surgery. The acknowledgment draws a clear separation between American DOs, who are medical doctors, and non-physician osteopaths trained outside of the United States. Within the international standards that classify jobs to promote international comparability across occupations, US-trained DOs are now categorized with all other physicians as medical doctors. This event took place in June 2018 and started a relay of events and opened doors for DOs as more countries started to understand and give full recognition to US-trained medical doctors with the DO degree. The Association of Medical Councils of Africa (AMCOA) approved a resolution in 2019 granting the AOA's request that AMCOA recognize US-trained DOs as fully licensed physicians with practice rights equivalent to MDs, opening its 20 member countries, which include Botswana, Eswatini, Gambia, Ghana, Kenya, Lesotho, Liberia, Malawi, Mauritius, Namibia, Nigeria, Rwanda, Seychelles, Sierra Leone, South Africa, South Sudan, Tanzania, Uganda, Zambia, and Zimbabwe to DOs. (Note: Some of the member African countries of AMCOA had independently licensed DOs before; however, this recognition unifies those who did or did not).

Similarly, on November 9, 2023, during its 15th biennial Members General Assembly in Bali, Indonesia, the International Association of Medical Regulatory Authorities (IAMRA) passed a resolution. This resolution endorses the acknowledgement of U.S.-trained DOs as fully licensed physicians, on par with MDs, across 47 member countries of IAMRA. IAMRA members include the medical councils of the following countries: Albania, Australia, Bahamas, Bangladesh, Bhutan, Brazil, Canada, Egypt, Eswatini, Finland, Germany, Ghana, Grenada, Hong Kong, India, Indonesia, Ireland, Oman, Pakistan, Rwanda, Seychelles, Sierra Leone, Singapore, South Africa, South Korea, South Sudan, Sudan, Tanzania, The Gambia, Trinidad and Tobago, Uganda, United Arab Emirates, United Kingdom, United States of America, and Zimbabwe. While many of these countries already recognized the DO as a medical degree prior to the convention, it unified many other countries under the umbrella.

Furthermore, DOs may work internationally as physicians and surgeons with any humanitarian organization such as the World Health Organization and Doctors Without Borders. The following is an international licensure summary for US-trained Doctors of Osteopathic Medicine, as listed by the American Osteopathic Association, that shows countries where US DOs have previously applied for licensure (countries not listed are regions with no history of US DOs applying for licensure):

AOA international licensure summary
Country		Year of latest policy	Medical practice rights	Requirements for licensure
Argentina		2006	Unlimited	Foreign physicians must submit credentials to various agencies and then appear before any of the National Universities to have their diploma recognized.
Australia		2013	Unlimited	According to documents published online, the Medical Board of Australia has "agreed to accept the DO USA as a primary medical qualification for medical registration provided that the DO USA was awarded by a medical school which has been accredited by the Commission on Osteopathic College Accreditation".
Austria		2009	Unlimited	Hospital must have position unable to be filled by an Austrian physician.
Bahamas		2004	Unlimited	US license recognized.
Bahrain		2010	Unlimited	US license recognized.
Bangladesh		2000s	Unlimited	US license recognized.
Barbados		1995	Limited	Osteopathic manipulative medicine (OMM) only.
Belize		2009	Unlimited	Must complete a Belizean residency for permanent license eligibility.
Bermuda		1997	Unlimited	Required at least 2 years of GME and examination or interview by the council's Examination Committee. Non-Bermudans must have approval from the Ministry of Labour and Home Affairs to work on the island.
Botswana		2019	Unlimited	
Brazil		2007	Unlimited	Completion of Brazilian board exam, establishing residency and some training in a Brazilian hospital is required.
Canada	Alberta		Unlimited	Requires at least 2 years of GME accredited by the ACGME or AOA and must have passed the Universities Coordinating Council Exam, a basic sciences exam, and have passed all three parts of the Licentiate of the Medical Council of Canada.
Canada	British Columbia		Unlimited	Requires at least 1 year of GME approved by the AOA or the ACGME, completed at least 1 year of GME in Canada, passed all three parts of the LMCC.
Canada	Manitoba		Unlimited	US license recognized.
Canada	New Brunswick		Unlimited	Requires at least 2 years of GME approved by the AOA or the ACGME and has passed all 3 parts of the LMCC. Reciprocity pathway for DO physicians with a Maine license.
Canada	Newfoundland		Unlimited	The Medical Act 2011 allows full licensure of osteopathic physicians, both for the country's full registry and its educational registry.
Canada	NW Territories		Unlimited	US license recognized.
Canada	Nova Scotia		Unlimited	Requires a Canadian or ACGME residency.
Canada	Ontario		Unlimited	Requires a Canadian or ACGME residency.
Canada	Prince Edward Island		Unlimited	
Canada	Quebec		Unlimited	Requires 1 year of GME approved by the AOA or ACGME, 1 year of GME in Quebec passed the written, oral and clinical board examination of the College of Family Physicians of Canada, and must speak French fluently.
Canada	Saskatchewan		Unlimited	
Canada	Yukon		Unlimited	US license recognized.
Cayman Islands (UK)		1983	Unlimited	US license recognized.
Central African Republic		1990	Unlimited	US licensure and annual attendance at the National Congress for Physicians.
Chile		2008	Unlimited	A written exam in Spanish is required, besides a series of practical tests involving common procedures (CPR, intubation, lumbar puncture, etc.).
China		2009	Unlimited	United States DO physicians are permitted to apply for short-term medical practice licensure.
Colombia		1996	Unlimited	Same requirements as other foreign physicians.
Costa Rica		2009	Unlimited	Same requirements as other foreign physicians.
Dominican Republic		2000	Unlimited	US license & board certification recognized.
Ecuador		1990	Unlimited	Same requirements as other foreign physicians. Reciprocity exists in most Latin American countries.
Eswatini		2019	Unlimited	
Ethiopia		2011	Unlimited	Must renew the license every 5 years.
Finland		1996	Unlimited	Same requirements as other foreign physicians.
France		2009	Limited	OMM only. The French government does not recognize the full scope of practice of osteopathic medicine.
The Gambia		2011	Unlimited	
Germany		2008	Unlimited	Same requirements as other foreign physicians. Depends on the need. Decisions are made on an individual basis.
Ghana		2019	Unlimited	
Greece		2009	Unlimited	Greek citizenship is required, unless, in rare instances, there exists a crucial need for certain types of specialist physicians. Further, a work permit must be obtained, a difficult task, and speaking Greek is an unwritten requirement. These are the same requirements as other foreign physicians.
Grenada		2007	Unlimited	US license recognized.
Guyana		1996	Unlimited	Case-by-case basis.
Honduras		2009	Unlimited	Universidad Nacional Autónoma de Honduras must accredit all foreign titles. After accreditation is completed, the applicant must seek registration with the Medical College of Honduras (MCH).
Hong Kong		1998	Unlimited	Written examination. Personal interview. Training approval.
India		2019	Unlimited	The Doctor of Osteopathic Medicine (DO) degree is fully recognized for medical and surgical practice. In 2019, the Indian National Medical Commission (NMC) approved that a DO graduate may practice the full scope of medicine in India only if they have completed Accreditation Council for Graduate Medical Education (ACGME) residencies, which are already recognized by the NMC. According to the Indian Medical Act of 1956, "Provided further that a person seeking provisional or permanent registration shall not have to qualify the Screening Test if he/she holds an Under Graduate medical qualification from Australia/Canada/New Zealand/United Kingdom/United States of America and the holder thereof also been awarded a Post Graduate medical qualification in Australia/Canada/New Zealand/United Kingdom/United States of America and has been recognized for enrolment as medical practitioner in that country." A U.S.-granted MD or DO satisfies the undergraduate qualification requirement of this law, and ACGME residencies fulfill the postgraduate qualification clause. At the time, the Commission requested additional time to decide on recognizing residencies under the American Osteopathic Association (AOA) for those DOs who graduated from AOA residencies prior to the 2020 AOA-ACGME merger. In 2023, the NMC formally approved the now-discontinued AOA residency system, recognizing AOA credentials for DOs who completed their training under this system before the merger.
Indonesia		1992	Unlimited and restricted	Foreign physicians affiliated with a university project or a mission have unlimited practice rights. No private practice is allowed.
Iran		2009	Unlimited	Iranian citizens who have received both the DO degree from a US osteopathic school and are board-certified in a clinical specialty. Osteopathic degrees from other countries are not accepted. The process of evaluation of the medical education and clinical training is under the jurisdiction of the Ministry of Health and Medical Education (MoHME).
Israel		2007	Unlimited	Same requirements as other foreign physicians. Hebrew required.
Italy		2009	Unlimited	Physicians are discouraged from seeking employment in Italy without firm contracts and work permits. If there is a US state law outlining reciprocity with Italy, a statement to this effect from the Italian Consulate will warrant better chances.
Jamaica		1994	Limited and restricted	DO physicians were permitted to supply some services while participating in a specific mission project.
Jordan		2012	Unlimited	
Kenya		2007	Unlimited	
Lebanon		2004	Unlimited	AOA letter required. Examination required.
Lesotho		1990s	Unlimited	Applicants must appear before the Medical, Dental, and Pharmacy Council to answer some medical questions and present their credentials. The council will also make a recommendation about where the applicant's skills would be most helpful in the country.
Liberia		1990s	Unlimited	Same requirements as other foreign physicians.
Luxembourg		1987	Unlimited	The practice of medicine in Luxembourg by a doctor who is not an EU national is very rare.
Malta		2010	Unlimited	Accepted on a case-by-case basis if the training meets the minimum educational requirements for physicians in the EU (Article 24 of Directive 2005/36/EC). Examination required.
Malawi		1991	Unlimited	
Mauritius		2019	Unlimited	
Mexico		2011	Unlimited & Restricted	Yucatán's Health Secretary Alvaro Quijano of the signed a proclamation recognizing US-trained osteopathic physicians in the state of Yucatán; DO physicians may now obtain short-term and long-term licensure through the Health Secretary's office. All other Mexican states require work permits, which are only available in conjunction with the association of a short-term medical mission project.
Micronesia		1993	Unlimited	Statutes specifically include DOs
Namibia		2019	Unlimited	
Nepal		2008	Unlimited	Approval by the Nepal Medical Council and a visa from the Immigration Department.
Netherlands		2009	Unlimited	Same requirements as other foreign physicians.
New Zealand		2008	Unlimited	Hearing required. Case-by-case basis.
Nigeria		2010	Unlimited	US licensure and completion of specialty training required.
Norway		2009	Limited	OMM only, but DOs may apply for recognition as medical doctors.
Pakistan		2011	Unlimited	US osteopathic medical schools meet the Medical and Dental Council's statutory regulations for international medical graduates. The scope is unlimited, but practice setting may be restricted
Panama		2009	Unlimited	Panamanian citizenship required.
Papua New Guinea		2010	Unlimited	Work permit required. Short-term or a long-term volunteer service license is also available.
Peru		2011	Unlimited	Process for licensure is the same as for other IMGs.
Poland		2009	Unlimited	Examination & Polish required.
Qatar		2011	Unlimited	Must possess a valid work visa, and pass written and oral examinations.
Rwanda		2019	Unlimited	
Russia		2006	Unlimited	Foreign physicians make arrangements to practice through Russian sponsors, such as hospitals or businesses.
Saint Lucia		2000	Unlimited	US credentials recognized.
Saudi Arabia		2009	Unlimited	Foreign physicians must be recruited by a government agency, a corporation, or a private health care entity, such as a hospital.
Seychelles		2019	Unlimited	
Sierra Leone		1993	Unlimited	Notarized US credentials recognized.
South Africa		2019	Unlimited	US degree recognized. The AMCOA recognition of American trained DOs gave full medical and surgical practicing rights to the professionals. Same requirements as foreign physicians.
South Sudan		2019	Unlimited	
Sweden		2005	Unlimited	Same requirements as other foreign physicians. Applicants must have their educations evaluated in order to determine if it is equivalent to the Swedish standards. After this, applicants must complete a two-part proficiency exam consisting of theoretical and practical portions. As this test is given in Swedish, applicants must speak Swedish at Level C1 in accordance with the Common European Framework of Reference for Languages. Proficiency in Norwegian or Danish also satisfy the language requirements. A course in Swedish laws and additional clinical training is required upon a passing exam score. Some temporary allowances are made.
Taiwan		2020	Unlimited	As per licensure, a qualifying candidate graduated from the department of medicine in a foreign university or independent college recognized by the R.O.C. Ministry of Education. All US issued DO medical degree programs are recognized by the R.O.C. Ministry of Education, since United States DO physicians are permitted to apply for medical practice licensure in R.O.C. since 2009.
Tanzania		1985	Unlimited	US license and GME recognized. Temporary work permits are available.
Uganda		2008	Unlimited	
United Arab Emirates		2009	Unlimited	Examination required.
United Kingdom		2005	Unlimited	US-trained DO physicians are eligible for full medical practice rights. Applicants must pass the Professional and Linguistic Assessments Board (PLAB) examination and work for one year in the National Health Service. Following that year, the applicants will be able to apply for a license to practice privately. For GMC registration as a specialist, postgraduate training will need to be separately recognized by the Postgraduate Medical Education and Training Board (PMETB). GOsC registration is also required.
Venezuela		2007	Unlimited	Recognized status under the law of the practice of medicine.
Vietnam		1995	Unlimited	Foreign physicians can fill vacancies in hospitals that need certain specialists.
Zambia		2009	Unlimited	US licensure required.
Zimbabwe		2019	Unlimited	The AMCOA recognition of American trained DOs gave full medical and surgical practicing rights to the professionals. Same requirements as foreign physicians.
OMM: Osteopathic Manipulative Medicine

== See also ==
- List of medical schools in the United States
