= List of defunct medical schools in the United States =

This list of defunct medical schools in the United States includes former medical schools that previously awarded either the Doctor of Medicine (MD) or Doctor of Osteopathic Medicine (DO) degree, either of which is required to become a physician in the United States. MD-granting medical schools are accredited by the Liaison Committee on Medical Education, while DO-granting medical schools are accredited by the American Osteopathic Association Commission on Osteopathic College Accreditation.

State	School	City	Est	First class	Closed	Degree	Notes
Alabama	Birmingham Medical College	Birmingham	1894	1895	1915		1913 became Graduate School of Medicine of the University of Alabama
Alabama	Graffenburg Institute	Dadeville	1852	1856	1862		
Alabama	Medical College Montezuma University	Bessemer	1896	1897	1898		
Alabama	Southern University, Medical Department	Greensboro	1872		1880		
Arkansas	Bethel Medical Department, Southwestern University	Little Rock	Unknown		1890		
Arkansas	College of Physicians and Surgeons	Little Rock	1906	1907	1911		1911 merged with University of Arkansas Medical Department
Arkansas	Medical Department of Sulphur Rock College	Sulphur Rock	1898		1902		No graduates, 1902 removed to Texarkana and became Gate City Medical College
California	California Eclectic Medical College	Los Angeles	1879	1880	1915		1879–1907 California Medical College in Oakland, 1887–1906 moved to San Francisco, 1906–1907 suspended, 1907–1915 California Eclectic Medical College in Los Angeles
California	California Medical Society and College of Physicians	San Francisco	1876		1877		No graduates
California	College of Physicians and Surgeons	Los Angeles	1903	1905	1909		1909 became Medical Department of the University of Southern California
California	College of Physicians and Surgeons of San Francisco	San Francisco	1896	1897	1921		1918 suspended teaching
California	Cooper Medical College	San Francisco	1858	1860	1912		1858–1864 Medical Department of University of the Pacific, 1864–1870 discontinued, 1870 revived, 1873–1882 Medical College of San Francisco (Medical College of the Pacific), 1882 became Cooper Medical College, 1908 merged with Leland Stanford Junior University
California	Hahnemann Medical College of the Pacific	San Francisco	1881	1884	1915		Homeopathic. 1881–1888 Hahnemann Medical College, 1888–1902 Hahnemann Hospital College of San Francisco, 1902–1915 Hahnemann Medical College of the Pacific, 1915 merged with University of California Medical School
California	Oakland College of Medicine and Surgery	Oakland	1900	1906	1921		1918 suspended teaching
California	Pacific Coast Regular College of Medicine	San Francisco	1900		1907		Fraudulent. 1900–1907 West Coast Medical College
California	Toland Medical College	Berkeley & San Francisco	1863	1865	1872		1872 became Medical Department, University of California
Colorado	Denver and Gross College of Medicine, Medical Department, University of Denver	Denver	1902	1903	1911		1902 formed as merger of Gross Medical College and Denver College of Medicine, 1911 merged with University of Colorado School of Medicine
Colorado	Denver College of Medicine	Denver	1881	1882	1902		1902 merged with Gross Medical College to form Denver and Gross College of Medicine
Colorado	Denver College of Physicians and Surgeons	Denver	1894	1895	1909		1894–1907 Denver Homeopathic College, 1907–1908 Westminster University College of Medicine, 1908–1909 Denver College of Physicians and Surgeons
Colorado	Gross Medical College	Denver	1887	1888	1902		1887 Medical Department Rocky Mountain University, 1902 merged with Denver College of Medicine to form Denver and Gross College of Medicine
District of Columbia	National University Medical Department	Washington	1884	1885	1903		1903 merged with Columbian University Medical Department
District of Columbia	Washington Homeopathic Medical College	Washington	1893	1894	1896		1893–1896 National Homeopathic Medical College, 1896 Washington Homeopathic Medical College
Florida	Tallahassee College of Medicine and Surgery, Medical Department of the University of Florida^{Did not exist until 20 years later.}	Jacksonville	1883		1886		1883 located in Tallahassee, 1885 moved to Jacksonville
Georgia	Atlanta College of Physicians and Surgeons	Atlanta	1898	1899	1913		1898 formed as merger of Atlanta Medical College and Southern Medical College, 1913 merged with Atlanta School of Medicine to form Atlanta Medical College
Georgia	Atlanta Medical College	Atlanta	1854	1855	1915		1854 Atlanta Medical College, 1861–1865 suspended, 1898 merged with Southern Medical College to become Atlanta College of Physicians and Surgeons, 1913 merged with Atlanta School of Medicine to become Atlanta Medical College, 1915 became Medical Department of Emory University
Georgia	Atlanta School of Medicine	Atlanta	1905	1906	1913		1913 merged with Atlanta College of Physicians and Surgeons to form Atlanta Medical College
Georgia	Clark University Medical Department	Atlanta	1886		Unknown		No graduates
Georgia	Dalton Medical College	Dalton	1866		Unknown		
Georgia	Georgia College of Eclectic Medicine and Surgery	Atlanta	1877	1878	1916		1877 Georgia Eclectic Medical College, 1884 acquired charter of College of American Medicine and Surgery, 1886 Georgia College of Eclectic Medicine and Surgery
Georgia	Hospital Medical College, Eclectic	Atlanta	1908	1909	1911		
Georgia	International Medical Missionary College and Training School for Nurses	Atlanta	1904	1906	1908		
Georgia	Middle Georgia Medical College	Griffin	1859		Unknown		
Georgia	Oglethorpe Medical College	Savannah	1856		1861		
Georgia	Savannah Medical College	Savannah	1838		1880		1861–1867 suspended
Georgia	Southern Botanico-Medical College	Macon	1839	1841	1884		1839 located in Forsyth, 1846 moved to Macon, 1854 Reform Medical College of Georgia, 1861–1867 suspended, 1874 College of American Medicine and Surgery, 1881 moved to Atlanta, 1884 charter transferred to Georgia College of Eclectic Medicine and Surgery
Georgia	Southern College of Medicine and Surgery	Atlanta	1911	1912	1914		
Georgia	Southern Medical College	Atlanta	1878	1880	1898		1898 merged with Atlanta Medical College to form Atlanta College of Physicians and Surgeons
Georgia	Thompsonian College	Barbourville	1850		Unknown		
Georgia	Woman's Medical College of Georgia and Training School for Nurses	Atlanta	1889	1890	Unknown		
Illinois	American Medical Missionary College	Chicago	1895	1899	1910		1910 absorbed by College of Physicians and Surgeons
Illinois	Bennett Medical College	Chicago	1868	1870	1915		1868 Bennett College of Eclectic Medicine and Surgery, 1909 Bennett Medical College, 1910 absorbed Illinois Medical College, 1910 affiliated with Loyola University to become School of Medicine of Loyola University, 1911 absorbed Reliance Medical College, 1915 Loyola University assumed full control
Illinois	Chaddock School of Medicine	Quincy	1882	1883	1890		1882 Quincy College of Medicine, 1888 Chaddock School of Medicine
Illinois	Chicago College of Medicine and Surgery	Chicago	1901	1903	1917		1901 American College of Medicine and Surgery (Chicago Eclectic Medical College), 1902 American College of Medicine and Surgery, 1902 affiliated with Medical Department of Valparaiso University, 1905 dropped eclecticism, 1907 Chicago College of Medicine and Surgery, 1911 absorbed College of Medicine and Surgery, Physio-Medical, 1917 merged with Loyola University School of Medicine
Illinois	Chicago College of Medicine and Surgery, Physio-Medical	Chicago	1897		1899		No graduates. 1899 merged with Chicago Physio-Medical College to form College of Medicine and Surgery, Physio-Medical
Illinois	Chicago College of Science	Chicago	1888		1889		Fraudulent
Illinois	Chicago Homeopathic Medical College	Chicago	1876	1877	1904		1904 merged with Hahnemann Medical College
Illinois	College of Medicine and Surgery (Physio-Medical)	Chicago	1885	1886	1911		1885 Chicago Physio-Medical Institution, 1891 Chicago Physio-Medical College, 1899 absorbed Chicago College of Medicine and Surgery (Physio-Medical) and became College of Medicine and Surgery (Physio-Medical), 1908 merged with Physio-Medical College of Dallas, Texas, 1911 absorbed by Chicago College of Medicine and Surgery
Illinois	College of Physicians and Surgeons of the Upper Mississippi	Rock Island	1848	1849	1849		1849 moved to Keokuk, Iowa and became College of Physicians and Surgeons
Illinois	Dearborn Medical College	Chicago	1903	1904	1907		
Illinois	Dunham Medical College	Chicago	1895	1896	1902		1902 merged with Herling Medical College
Illinois	Dutton Medical College	Chicago	1899		1903		Fraudulent
Illinois	Edinburg University	Chicago	1862		Unknown		Fraudulent. 1862 Chicago Northwestern College, 1870 Edinburg University
Illinois	Franklin Medical College	St. Charles	1842		1849		Closed after a grave-robbing scandal and protesters shooting the school's founder "/>
Illinois	German Academy of Psychiatric Physicians	Chicago	1892		1892		Fraudulent
Illinois	German College of Gynecology, Pediatrics and Obstetrics	Chicago	1892		1892		Fraudulent
Illinois	German College of Medicine and Obstetrics	Chicago	1891		1891		Fraudulent
Illinois	German Homeopathic Medical College	Chicago	1891		1891		Fraudulent
Illinois	German Medical College	Chicago	1891		1891		Fraudulent
Illinois	German-American Homeopathic Medical College	Chicago	1892		1892		Fraudulent
Illinois	Hahnemann Medical College and Hospital of Chicago	Chicago	1859	1861	1922		Homeopathic. Merged with Chicago Homeopathic Medical College in 1904. Attempted merger with Northwestern in 1921, but failed.
Illinois	Harvey Medical College	Chicago	1891	1895	1905		Night school
Illinois	Hering Medical College	Chicago	1892	1893	1913		Homeopathic. 1902 absorbed Dunham Medical College
Illinois	Illinois Health University	Chicago	Unknown		1897		Fraudulent. Succeeded by Independent Medical College and Metropolitan Medical College
Illinois	Illinois Medical College	Chicago	1894	1895	1910		1910 absorbed by Bennett Medical College
Illinois	Illinois Standard College of Medicine and Surgery	Chicago	1898		Unknown		
Illinois	Independent Medical College	Chicago	Unknown		1899		Fraudulent diploma mill
Illinois	International medical Missionary Institute	Chicago	1895		Unknown		
Illinois	Jenner Medical College	Chicago	1892	1896	1918		1918 recognition withdrawn by Illinois Department of Registration and Education
Illinois	Lombard College Medical Department	Galesburg	1903		1903		One session
Illinois	Medical Department of Illinois College	Jacksonville	1843		1848		
Illinois	Metropolitan Medical College	Chicago	1899		1900		Fraudulent
Illinois	National Medical University	Chicago	1891	1892	1909		1891 National Homeopathic Medical College, 1895 National Medical College, 1900 National Medical University, 1909 declared not in good standing by Illinois State Board of Health
Illinois	National University of Illinois	Chicago	1889		1890		Fraudulent
Illinois	Northwestern College of Midwifery	Chicago	1875		1888		Fraudulent. 1878 moved to Indianapolis and became Indiana College of Medicine and Midwifery
Illinois	Northwestern University Woman's Medical School	Chicago	1870	1871	1902		1870 Woman's Hospital Medical College, 1879 Woman's Medical College, 1892 Woman's Medical School of Northwestern University
Illinois	Reliance Medical College	Chicago	1907	1909	1911		Night school. 1911 absorbed by Bennett Medical College
Illinois	Scientific Medical College	Chicago	1898		1900		Fraudulent. Successor (with unchartered International University of Chicago) of Metropolitan Medical College. 1900 closed by postal authorities
Indiana	American Medical College	Indianapolis	1894	1895	1897		
Indiana	Beach Medical Institute	Indianapolis	1883	1885	1886		1883 Beach Medical College, 1884 Beach Medical Institute, 1886 merged with Indiana Eclectic Medical College
Indiana	Central College of Physicians and Surgeons	Indianapolis	1879	1880	1905		1905 merged with Fort Wayne College of Medicine and Medical College of Indiana to form Indiana Medical College, School of Medicine of Purdue University
Indiana	College of Physicians and Surgeons of Indiana	Indianapolis	1873	1874	1878		1878 merged with Indiana Medical College to form Medical College of Indiana
Indiana	Curtis Physio-Medical Institute	Marion	1881	1882	1900		1893 moved to Indianapolis under new charter, 1894 moved back to Marion
Indiana	Eclectic College of Physicians and Surgeons	Indianapolis	1890	1891	1894		
Indiana	Eclectic Medical College of Indiana	Indianapolis	1900	1903	1908		1908 withdrawn by Indiana State Board of Medical Examiners
Indiana	Fort Wayne College of Medicine	Fort Wayne	1879	1880	1905		1905 merged with Medical College of Indiana and Central College of Physicians and Surgeons to form Indiana Medical College, School of Medicine of Purdue University
Indiana	Hospital Medical College of Evansville	Evansville	1882	1883	1886		
Indiana	Indiana Central Medical College, Medical Department Indiana Asbury University	Greencastle	1850		1854		
Indiana	Indiana College of Medicine and Midwifery	Indianapolis	1878		1888		
Indiana	Indiana Eclectic Medical College	Indianapolis	1880		1890		1886 absorbed Beach Medical Institute
Indiana	Indiana Medical College (1)	La Porte	1844		1849		1844 Medical Department of La Porte University, 1845 Indiana Medical College
Indiana	Indiana Medical College (2)	Indianapolis	1869	1870	1878		1878 merged with College of Physicians and Surgeons of Indiana to form Medical College of Indiana
Indiana	Indiana Medical College, School of Medicine of Purdue University	Indianapolis	1905	1906	1908		1905 created by merger of Central College of Physicians and Surgeons, Fort Wayne College of Medicine, and Medical College of Indiana, 1908 merged with Indiana University School of Medicine
Indiana	Medical College of Evansville	Evansville	1849	1850	1884		1854–1871 suspended
Indiana	Medical College of Fort Wayne	Fort Wayne	1876	1877	1883		
Indiana	Medical College of Indiana	Indianapolis	1878	1879	1905		1878 created by merger of Indiana Medical College and College of Physicians and Surgeons of Indiana, 1879–1883 Medical Department Butler University, 1895–1905 Medical Department University of Indianapolis (1896), 1905 merged with Central College of Physicians and Surgeons and Fort Wayne College of Medicine to form Indiana Medical College, School of Medicine of Purdue University
Indiana	Physio-Medical College of Indiana	Indianapolis	1873	1874	1909		
Indiana	State College of Physicians and Surgeons	Indianapolis	1906	1907	1907		1907 merged with Indiana University School of Medicine
Indiana	The Christian College at New Albany	New Albany	1833		1833		Fraudulent
Indiana	University of Medicine	Indianapolis	1897	1898	1898		Not recognized by Indiana State Board of Medical Examiners
Indiana	Valparaiso University School of Medicine	Valparaiso	1902		1917		Affiliated with Chicago College of Medicine and Surgery
Iowa	College of Physicians and Surgeons	Keokuk	1848	1849	1899		1848 Medical Department of the University of Upper Mississippi in Rock Island, Illinois, 1849 moved to Keokuk, 1849 College of Physicians and Surgeons, 1854 Medical Department University of Iowa, 1870 College of Physicians and Surgeons, 1899 merged with Keokuk Medical College, College of Physicians and Surgeons
Iowa	Council Bluffs Medical College	Council Bluffs	1893		1895		No graduates
Iowa	Drake University College of Medicine	Des Moines	1882	1883	1913		1887 Medical Department of Drake University, 1903 Drake University College of Medicine, 1908 absorbed Keokuk Medical College, College of Physicians and Surgeons, 1913 merged with the State University of Iowa College of Medicine
Iowa	Iowa Medical College	Keokuk	1858		1860		
Iowa	Iowa Medical College, Eclectic	Des Moines	1881	1882	1887		1881 Iowa Eclectic Medical College, the Medical Department of Drake University, 1883 Iowa Medical College, Eclectic
Iowa	Keokuk Medical College	Keokuk	1890	1891	1899		1899 merged with College of Physicians and Surgeons to form Keokuk Medical College, College of Physicians and Surgeons
Iowa	Keokuk Medical College, College of Physicians and Surgeons	Keokuk	1899	1900	1908		1899 created by merger of Keokuk Medical College and the College of Physicians and Surgeons, Keokuk, 1908 absorbed by Drake University College of Medicine
Iowa	King Eclectic Medical College	Des Moines	1883	1884	1889		
Iowa	Sioux City College of Medicine	Sioux City	1890	1893	1909		
Iowa	University of Iowa College of Homeopathic Medicine	Iowa City	1877	1878	Unknown		
Kansas	College of Physicians and Surgeons, Medical Department Kansas City University	Kansas City	1894	1895	1905		1905 absorbed by University of Kansas School of Medicine
Kansas	Kansas City College of Medicine and Surgery	Kansas City	1897	1898	1898		1898 moved to Kansas City, Missouri, and became the Medico-Chirurgical College
Kansas	Kansas Medical College	Independence	1872		1875		
Kansas	Kansas Medical College	Topeka	1890	1892	1913		1903 Medical Department of Washburn College, 1913 merged with the University of Kansas School of Medicine
Kansas	Wichita Medical College	Wichita	1889		1889		No graduates. Suspended after one session.
Kentucky	Eclectic Medical College of Indiana	Louisville	1848		Unknown		
Kentucky	Hospital College of Medicine, Medical Department Central University of Kentucky	Louisville	1874	1875	1907		1907 merged with Louisville Medical College to form Louisville and Hospital Medical College
Kentucky	Jefferson School of Medicine	Louisville	1882		Unknown		Graduated one class and suspended
Kentucky	Kentucky School of Medicine	Louisville	1817	1817	1908		1817 Medical Department Transylvania University, 1850 Kentucky School of Medicine of Louisville, 1908 merged into Medical Department of the University of Louisville
Kentucky	Kentucky University Medical Department	Louisville	1898	1899	1907		1907 merged with Medical Department of University of Louisville
Kentucky	Louisville and Hospital Medical College	Louisville	1907	1908	1908		1907 created by merger of Louisville Medical College and Hospital College of Medicine, 1908 merged with Medical Department of the University of Louisville
Kentucky	Louisville Medical College	Louisville	1869	1870	1907		1907 merged with Hospital College of Medicine to form Louisville and Hospital Medical College
Kentucky	Louisville National Medical College, Medical Department State University	Louisville	1888	1889	1912		African American. 1903 merged with State University Medical Department
Kentucky	Medical Department, State University	Louisville	1899		1903		African American. 1903 merged with Louisville National Medical College
Kentucky	Southwestern Homeopathic Medical College and Hospital	Louisville	1892	1894	1910		
Louisiana	Charity Hospital Medical College	New Orleans	1873		1877		
Louisiana	Flint Medical College of New Orleans University	New Orleans	1889	1892	1911		African American. 1899 Medical College of New Orleans University, 1901 Flint Medical College of New Orleans University
Louisiana	New Orleans School of Medicine	New Orleans	1856		1870		
Maine	Bowdoin Medical School, Medical Department of Bowdoin College	Brunswick & Portland	1820	1821	1921		1820 Medical School of Maine, 1915 Bowdoin Medical School
Maine	Druidic University of Maine	Lewiston	1880		1887		1887 charter revoked by State Legislature
Maine	Eclectic Medical College of Maine	Lewiston	1880		1887		1887 charter revoked by State Legislature
Maine	Portland School of Medical Instruction	Portland	1856		1902		Preparatory school only, did not grant degrees
Maryland	Atlantic Medical College	Baltimore	1890	1892	1910		1890 Southern Homeopathic Medical College, 1907 Atlantic Medical College
Maryland	Baltimore Medical College	Baltimore	1882	1883	1913		1913 merged with University of Maryland School of Medicine
Maryland	Baltimore University School of Medicine	Baltimore	1884	1885	1907		
Maryland	College of Physicians and Surgeons	Baltimore	1872	1873	1915		1877 absorbed Washington University School of Medicine, 1915 merged with the University of Maryland School of Medicine
Maryland	Maryland College of Eclectic Medicine and Surgery	Baltimore	1912		1915		1912 Eclectic School of Medicine of Milton University, 1913 Eastern University School of Medicine, 1914 Maryland College of Eclectic Medicine and Surgery, 1915 not recognized by Maryland State Board of medical Examiners
Maryland	Maryland Medical College	Baltimore	1898	1899	1913		
Maryland	Medico-Chirurgical and Theological College of Christ's Institution	Baltimore	1900		1909		African American
Maryland	Washington Medical College	Baltimore	1827	1828	1877		1827 Medical Department Washington College, Washington, Pennsylvania, 1840 Washington University School of Medicine, 1851 became extinct, 1867 reorganized, 1877 merged with College of Physicians and Surgeons of Baltimore
Maryland	Woman's Medical College of Baltimore	Baltimore	1882	1883	1910		
Massachusetts	Middlesex College of Medicine and Surgery	Waltham	1914	1915	1947		Not recognized by Massachusetts Medical Society (i.e., unaccredited). Lack of accreditation energetically contested by school. Known at the time as the only medical school in the U.S. without a quota on Jews. Facilities were subsequently transferred to the successor institution, Brandeis University.
Massachusetts	Bellevue Medical College of Massachusetts	Boston	Unknown		1883		Fraudulent
Massachusetts	Berkshire Medical College	Pittsfield	1823		1867		1823 Medical Department Williams College
Massachusetts	Clark University Medical Department	Worcester	1887		Unknown		Did not grant degrees
Massachusetts	College of Physicians and Surgeons	Boston	1880	1882	(after 1918)		Not recognized by Massachusetts Medical Society
Massachusetts	Excelsior Medical College	Boston	Unknown		1883		Fraudulent
Massachusetts	New England University of Arts and Sciences	Boston	Unknown		1881		Fraudulent
Massachusetts	Reserved College of Physicians and Surgeons	Springfield	Unknown		1893		Fraudulent
Massachusetts	Worcester Medical College, Eclectic	Worcester	1848		1859		1848 New England Botanico-Medical College, 1852 Worcester Medical College, 1857 moved to Boston, 1858 moved to Worcester
Michigan	Detroit Homeopathic College	Detroit	1899	1900	1912		
Michigan	Detroit Homeopathic Medical College	Detroit	1871		1876		
Michigan	Detroit University of Medicine	Detroit	1881		Unknown		
Michigan	Detroit University of Rational Medicine and Surgery	Detroit	1880		Unknown		
Michigan	Grand Rapids Medical College	Grand Rapids	1897	1898	1907		
Michigan	Michigan College of Medicine	Detroit	1880	1881	1885		1885 merged with Detroit Medical College to form Detroit College of Medicine
Michigan	Michigan College of Medicine and Surgery	Detroit	1888	1889	1907		1903 merged with Saginaw Valley Medical College
Michigan	Michigan Eclectic Medical College	Detroit	1880		Unknown		
Michigan	Michigan Homeopathic Medical College	Lansing	1872		1873		
Michigan	Michigan Medical College	Lansing	1871		1873		
Michigan	Michigan School of Homeopathy and Surgery	Detroit	1863		Unknown		
Michigan	Saginaw Valley Medical College	Saginaw	1896	1897	1903		1903 merged with Michigan College of Medicine and Surgery
Michigan	University of Michigan Homeopathic Medical School	Ann Arbor	1875	1877	1922		1922 merged into University of Michigan Medical School
Minnesota	Minneapolis College of Physicians and Surgeons	Minneapolis	1883	1884	1911		1895 Medical Department Hamline University, 1908 merged with College of Medicine and Surgery of the University of Minnesota
Minnesota	Minnesota Hospital College	Minneapolis	1881		1888		1881 Minnesota College Hospital, 1885 Minnesota Hospital College, 1888 absorbed by University of Minnesota College of Medicine and Surgery
Minnesota	St. Paul Medical College	St. Paul	1871	1886	1888		1871–1879 preparatory school, 1879 extinct, 1885 reopened and granted degrees, 1888 merged with Minnesota Hospital College and absorbed by University of Minnesota College of Medicine and Surgery
Minnesota	University of Minnesota College of Homeopathic Medicine and Surgery	Minneapolis	1886	1889	1909		1886 Minnesota Homeopathic Medical College, 1888 Homeopathic Medical Department of the University of Minnesota, 1909 abolished by the Board of Regents
Minnesota	University of Minnesota College of Medicine	Minneapolis	1883		1888		Examined BM and MD degrees. 1888 merged with St. Paul Medical College and Minnesota Hospital College to form University of Minnesota College of Medicine and Surgery
Minnesota	Winona Medical School	Winona	1872		Unknown		Preparatory school only, did not grant degrees
Mississippi	Mississippi Medical College	Meridian	1906	1907	1912		
Missouri	American Anthropological University of St. Louis	St. Louis	Unknown		1885		Fraudulent
Missouri	Barnes Medical College	St. Louis	1892	1893	1911		1911 merged with American Medical College
Missouri	Beaumont Hospital Medical College	St. Louis	1886	1887	1901		1901 merged with Marion-Sims College of Medicine to form Marion-Sims-Beaumont Medical College
Missouri	Central Medical College of St. Joseph	St. Joseph	1894	1895	1905		1905 merged with Ensworth Medical College
Missouri	College of Physicians and Surgeons of St. Joseph	St. Joseph	1878	1880	1882		1882 merged with St. Joseph Hospital Medical College to form St. Joseph Medical College
Missouri	Columbian Medical College	Kansas City	1898	1899	1901		1901 merged with Medico-Chirurgical College
Missouri	Eclectic Medical University	Kansas City	1898	1900	1918		1907 moved to Kansas City, KS from Kansas City, MO, 1908 Western Eclectic College of Medicine and Surgery, 1909 returned to Kansas City, MO and returned to Eclectic Medical University, 1918 not recognized by Missouri State Board of Health
Missouri	Ensworth Medical College	St. Joseph	1882	1883	1914		1882 created as St. Joseph Medical College by merger of St. Joseph Hospital Medical College and College of Physicians and Surgeons of St. Joseph, 1888 Ensworth Medical College, 1905 merged with Central Medical College to form Ensworth-Central Medical College of St. Joseph, 1907 Ensworth Medical College
Missouri	Hahnemann Medical College of Kansas City University	Kansas City	1896	1897	1902		1896 College of Homeopathic Medicine and Surgery of the Kansas City University, 1900 Hahnemann Medical College of the Kansas City University, 1902 merged with Kansas City Homeopathic Medical College to form Kansas City Hahnemann Medical College
Missouri	Hering Medical College	St. Louis	1880		1882		No graduates. 1882 merged with the Homeopathic Medical College of Missouri
Missouri	Hippocratean College of Medicine	St. Louis	1907		1910		Night school, no graduates
Missouri	Homeopathic Medical College of Kansas City	Kansas City	1873		Unknown		Fraudulent
Missouri	Homeopathic Medical College of Missouri	St. Louis	1859	1860	1909		1882 absorbed Hering Medical College and St. Louis College of Homeopathic Physicians and Surgeons
Missouri	Humboldt Medical College	St. Louis	1855		1869		1855 St. Louis College of Medical and Natural Sciences, 1859 Humboldt Institute, 1866 Humboldt Medical College
Missouri	Joplin College of Physicians and Surgeons	Joplin	1880	1881	1884		
Missouri	Joplin Medical College	Joplin	1881		1882		
Missouri	Kansas City College of Medicine and Surgery	Kansas City	1915	1916	Unknown		Eclectic. 1915 organized as offshoot of Eclectic Medical University, not recognized by Missouri State Board of Health
Missouri	Kansas City Hahnemann Medical College	Kansas City	1902	1903	1916		1902 created by merger of Kansas City Homeopathic Medical College and the Hahnemann Medical College of the Kansas City University, 1915 Southwest School of Medicine and Hospital
Missouri	Kansas City Homeopathic Medical College	Kansas City	1888	1889	1902		1902 merged with Hahnemann Medical College of the Kansas City University to form Kansas City Hahnemann Medical College
Missouri	Kansas City Hospital College of Medicine	Kansas City	1882	1883	1888		
Missouri	Kansas City Medical College	Kansas City	1869	1870	1905		1869 College of Physicians and Surgeons of Kansas City, 1880 Kansas City Medical College
Missouri	Marion-Sims College of Medicine	St. Louis	1890	1891	1903		1901 merged with Beaumont Hospital Medical College to form Marion-Sims-Beaumont Medical College, 1903 Medical Department of St. Louis University
Missouri	Medical College of Kansas City	Kansas City	1869	1870	1873		
Missouri	Medico-Chirurgical College of Kansas City	Kansas City	1897	1898	1905		1897 Kansas City (Kan) College of Medicine and Surgery, 1898 Medico-Chirugical College of Kansas City, 1901 absorbed Columbian Medical College, 1905 absorbed by the School of Medicine of the University of Kansas
Missouri	Missouri Eclectic Medical College	Kansas City	Unknown		1898		
Missouri	Missouri Medical College	St. Louis	1840	1841	1899		Also known as McDowell Medical College, 1840 Medical Department of Kemper College, 1845 Medical Department of the University of Missouri, 1855 Missouri Medical College, 1899 absorbed by the Medical Department of Washington University in St. Louis
Missouri	Missouri School of Midwifery and Diseases of Women and Children	St. Louis	1891		Unknown		Fraudulent
Missouri	National University of Arts and Sciences Medical Department	St. Louis	1873	1874	1918		1873 American Medical College (eclectic), 1910 dropped eclecticism, 1911 merged with Barnes Medical College, 1912 Medical Department of the National University of Arts and Sciences, 1915–1916 merged with St. Louis College of Physicians and Surgeons
Missouri	Northwestern Medical College	St. Joseph	1879	1881	1894		
Missouri	Occidental College of Physicians and Surgeons	Joplin	1886		1887		No classes
Missouri	St. Joseph Hospital Medical College	St. Joseph	1876	1878	1882		1882 merged with College of Physicians and Surgeons of St. Joseph to form St. Joseph Medical College
Missouri	St. Louis College of Homeopathic Medicine	St. Louis	1869		1882		1871–1880 suspended, 1882 merged with Homeopathic Medical College of Missouri
Missouri	St. Louis College of Physicians and Surgeons	St. Louis	1869	1870	Unknown		1869 College of Physicians and Surgeons of St. Louis, 1879 St. Louis College of Physicians and Surgeons, 1915 merged with Medical Department of the National University of Arts and Sciences, 1916 reestablished
Missouri	St. Louis Eclectic Medical College	St. Louis	1874		1883		
Missouri	St. Louis Hahnemann Medical College	St. Louis	1873	1874	1874		
Missouri	St. Louis Hygienic College of Physicians and Surgeons	St. Louis	1887		1893		
Missouri	St. Louis Medical College	St. Louis	1842	1843	1891		1842 Medical Department of St. Louis University, 1855 St. Louis Medical College/Pope's Medical College, 1891 became Medical Department of Washington University in St. Louis
Missouri	St. Louis Woman's Medical College	St. Louis	1894	1895	1896		
Missouri	University Medical College of Kansas City	Kansas City	1881	1882	1913		1881 University of Kansas City Medical Department, 1888 University Medical College of Kansas City
Missouri	Woman's Medical College	St. Louis	1883		1884		Homeopathic
Missouri	Woman's Medical College	Kansas City	1895	1896	1903		
Nebraska	Lincoln Medical College, Eclectic	Lincoln	1890	1891	Unknown		1890 Lincoln Medical College, 1911 Medical Department of Cotner University, 1915 Lincoln Medical College, Eclectic
Nebraska	Nebraska College of Medicine	Lincoln	1905	1907	1909		
Nebraska	Nebraska Medical College, Eclectic	Lincoln	1910		1911		No graduates
Nebraska	University of Nebraska College of Medicine, Eclectic Department	Lincoln	1883		1885		
Nebraska	University of Nebraska College of Medicine, Homeopathic Department	Lincoln	1883	1884	1887		
Nebraska	University of Nebraska College of Medicine, Regular Department	Lincoln	1870		1887		
New Hampshire	New England University of Arts and Sciences	Manchester	1876		1877		Fraudulent
New Hampshire	University of New Hampshire Department of Medicine	Nashua	1888		Unknown		Fraudulent
New Jersey	Touro University College of Medicine	Hackensack	2007		2009	MD	Did not receive LCME accreditation or enroll students
New Jersey	Central University of Medicine and Science	Jersey City	Unknown		1891		Fraudulent
New Jersey	Hygelo-Therapeutic College	Bergen Heights	Unknown		1891		Fraudulent. Mongrel institution
New Jersey	Livingston University	Haddonfield	Unknown		1891		Fraudulent
New Jersey	Medical and Surgical College of the State of New Jersey		1888		1891		1888 declared disreputable
New York	American College of Medical Science	New York City	1858		1858		No graduates
New York	Atlantic School of Osteopathy	Buffalo	1898		1906		moved from Wilkes Barre, PA to Buffalo in 1904, then merged with A.T. Still University in 1906
New York	Bellevue Hospital Medical College	Manhattan	1861	1862	1898		1898 merged with New York University Medical College to form University and Bellevue Hospital Medical College
New York	Buffalo College of Rational Medicine	Buffalo	1879		Unknown		Fraudulent. Homeopathic. Also known as College of Physicians and Surgeons
New York	College of Medicine	New York City	1836		1846		Botanic. Not recognized by the New York Board of Regents
New York	College of Physicians and Surgeons	Buffalo	1879	1880	1884		Homeopathic. 1879 Homeopathic College of Physicians and Surgeons, 1880 College of Physicians and Surgeons, 1884 closed by Supreme Court of the State of New York, diplomas legalized by special act of New York Legislature
New York	College of Physicians and Surgeons in the City of New York	Manhattan	1807	1811	1814		1814 merged with Medical Faculty of Columbia College
New York	College of Physicians and Surgeons of the Western District of New York	Fairfield	1812	1816	1840		Also known as Fairfield Medical School
New York	Eclectic Medical College of the City of New York	New York City	1866	1867	1913		
New York	Eclectic Medical Institute of New York	Rochester	1847		1849		1847 Medical School of Fredonia, 1848 moved to Rochester to become Eclectic Medical Institute of New York, 1849 merged with Randolph Eclectic Medical Institute and moved to Syracuse to become the Central Medical College of New York. Not recognized by the New York Board of Regents
New York	Edward Medical College	New York City	1889		Unknown		
New York	Excelsior Medical College	New York City	1857		1879		Not recognized by the New York Board of Regents
New York	Fordham University School of Medicine	Manhattan	1905	1909	1919	MD	1905 School of Medicine of St. John's College, 1907 Fordham University School of Medicine
New York	Hamburg Canal College	Buffalo	Unknown		1883		Fraudulent
New York	Medical and Surgical Institute and Sanitarium	Buffalo	1866		1893		Fraudulent. Also known as the American College of Arts and Sciences Medical Department, the American Society of Arts and Sciences, the American Society of Literature and Art, and the Druidic Banchorelon; connected with the University of New Hampshire Department of Medicine and the Trinity University College of Medicine and Surgery (VT)
New York	Medical Faculty of Rutger's (Queen's) College	New York City	1792	1792	1827		1792 New Medical Institution, Faculty of Medicine of Queen's College (New Jersey), 1826 Medical Faculty of Rutger's College, also Rutger's Faculty of Geneva College
New York	Metropolitan Medical College	New York City	1852		1862		Eclectic. 1862 charter revoked. Not recognized by the New York Board of Regents
New York	Mohawk Medical College	Buffalo	1879		1884		Fraudulent
New York	New York College of Magnetics	New York City	1887		1893		Not recognized by the New York Board of Regents
New York	New York Free Medical College for Women	New York City	1871	1873	1876		
New York	New York Hydropathic and Physiological School	New York City	1853				Authorized in 1857 by NY Legislature to grant MD degrees. Later known as New York Hygeio-Therapeutic College.
New York	New York Hygeio-Therapeutic College	New York City	1857		1864		
New York	New York Institute of Medical Science	New York City	1887		1893		Fraudulent
New York	New York Medical College	New York City	1850	1851	1864		
New York	New York Medical College and Hospital for Women	Manhattan	1863	1864	1918		Homeopathic. 1863 New York Medical College for Women, 1866 New York Medical College and Hospital for Women; 1918 students transferred to New York Medical College upon closure
New York	New York Preparatory School of Medicine	New York City	1859		Unknown		Not recognized by the New York Board of Regents
New York	New York Reformed Medical College	New York City	1826		1839		Eclectic. Diplomas not recognized by the New York Board of Regents
New York	New York School of Medicine	New York City	1831		1833		
New York	Niagara University Medical Department	Buffalo	1883	1886	1898		1898 merged with Medical Department of the University of Buffalo
New York	Preparatory Medical College	Poughkeepsie & New York City	1888		1893		Fraudulent
New York	Randolph Eclectic Medical Institute	Rochester	1848		1849		1849 merged with Eclectic Medical Institute of New York and moved to Syracuse to become the Central Medical College of New York. Not recognized by the New York Board of Regents
New York	Regents of University of State of New York		1875	1875	1895		Licensing board of the State of New York, which was empowered by statute to grant MD degree on examination
New York	Rochester Eclectic Medical College	Rochester	1849		1852		1849 formed as Central Medical College of New York in Syracuse by merger of Eclectic Medical Institute of New York and Randolph Eclectic Medical Institute, 1850 moved to Rochester and became Rochester Eclectic Medical College. Not recognized by the New York Board of Regents
New York	Syracuse Medical College	Syracuse	1850		1855		Eclectic. Not recognized by the New York Board of Regents
New York	United States Medical College	New York City	1878		1884		1884 closed by Supreme Court of the State of New York, diplomas legalized by special act of New York Legislature
New York	Woman's Medical College of the New York Infirmary for Women and Children	New York City	1868	1870	1899		
New York	Worcester Medical School	New York City	1846		1852		Eclectic. Not recognized by the New York Board of Regents
North Carolina	College of Physicians and Surgeons	Arlington	1871		Unknown		
North Carolina	Edinborough Medical College	Lumberton	1868		Unknown		
North Carolina	Leonard Medical School, Medical Department Shaw University	Raleigh	1882	1886	1918		First U.S. four-year medical school. African American.
North Carolina	North Carolina Medical College	Charlotte	1887	1893	1918		1887 Davidson School of Medicine, 1903 North Carolina Medical College, 1914 merged with Medical College of Virginia
Ohio	American Eclectic Medical College	Cincinnati	1876		1896		
Ohio	American Health College	Cincinnati	1874		1888		Fraudulent
Ohio	American Medical College	Cincinnati	1839		1857		Eclectic. 1857 merged with Eclectic Medical Institute
Ohio	Botanico-Medical College of Ohio	Cincinnati	1838		1850		
Ohio	Cincinnati College of Medicine and Surgery	Cincinnati	1849	1852	1902		Department for women was the Woman's Medical College of Cincinnati
Ohio	Cincinnati Medical College	Cincinnati	1834		1846		1846 merged with Medical College of Ohio
Ohio	Cleveland College of Physicians and Surgeons, Medical Department Ohio Wesleyan University	Cleveland	1881	1882	1913		1881 Medical Department of the University of Wooster, 1896 Cleveland College of Physicians and Surgeons and Medical Department Ohio Wesleyan University, 1910 merged with Western Reserve University Medical Department
Ohio	Cleveland Medical College	Cleveland	1890	1891	1898		Homeopathic. 1898 merged with Cleveland University of Medicine and Surgery to form Cleveland Homeopathic Medical College
Ohio	Cleveland University of Medicine and Surgery	Cleveland	1849	1851	1898		1849 Western College of Homeopathic Medicine, 1857 Western Homeopathic College, 1870 Homeopathic Hospital College, 1881 absorbed Homeopathic Medical College for Women, 1894 Cleveland University of Medicine and Surgery, 1898 merged with Cleveland Medical College (Homeopathic) to become the Cleveland Homeopathic Medical College
Ohio	Cleveland-Pulte Medical College	Cleveland	1898	1899	1914		1898 formed as Cleveland Homeopathic Medical College by merger of Cleveland University of Medicine and Surgery and Cleveland Medical College, 1910 merged with Pulte Medical College to become Cleveland-Pulte Medical College, 1914 transferred to the Ohio State University to become the Ohio State University College of Homeopathic Medicine
Ohio	Columbus Medical College	Columbus	1875	1876	1892		1892 merged with Starling Medical College
Ohio	Dayton Medical University	Dayton	1886	1887	1889		
Ohio	Eclectic College of Medicine and Surgery	Cincinnati	1856	1857	1859		1859 merged with Eclectic Medical Institute
Ohio	Eclectic Medical College	Cincinnati	1833	1833	1939		1833 Worthington Medical College, 1839–1843 suspended, 1845 Eclectic Medical Institute, 1857 absorbed American Medical College, 1859 absorbed Eclectic College of Medicine and Surgery, 1910 Eclectic Medical College
Ohio	Homeopathic Medical College for Women	Cleveland	1868		1870		1870 merged with Homeopathic Hospital College
Ohio	Hygela Medical College	Cincinnati	1893	1895	1899		Not recognized by Ohio State Board of Medical Registration and Examination
Ohio	International Electropathic Institution	Mentor	1861		1876		Not recognized by Ohio State Board of Medical Registration and Examination. 1861 formed in Philadelphia, Pennsylvania as Electropathic Institute, 1876 moved to Brantford, Ontario, and then Ohio
Ohio	Laura Memorial Woman's Medical College	Cincinnati	1895	1896	1903		1895 created by merger of the Woman's Medical College of Cincinnati and the Presbyterian Hospital and Woman's Medical College
Ohio	Medical University of Ohio	Cincinnati	1883		1891		Fraudulent
Ohio	Miami Medical College	Cincinnati	1852	1853	1909		1857 merged into Medical College of Ohio, 1865 reestablished, 1909 merged with the Medical College of Ohio to form the Ohio-Miami Medical College of the University of Cincinnati
Ohio	National Normal University College of Medicine	Lebanon	1889	1889	1896		
Ohio	Northwestern Ohio Medical College	Toledo	1883	1884	1891		1883 created as outgrowth of Toledo School of Medicine
Ohio	Ohio College of Obstetrics, Medicine and Midwifery	Cincinnati	1889		Unknown		Fraudulent
Ohio	Ohio Medical University	Columbus	1890	1893	1907		1907 merged with Starling Medical College to form Starling-Ohio Medical College
Ohio	Ohio State University College of Homeopathic Medicine	Columbus	1914		1922		1914 formed by transfer of Cleveland-Pulte Medical College of Cleveland to Ohio State University
Ohio	Physio-Eclectic Medical College	Cincinnati	1876		1879		Fraudulent
Ohio	Physio-Medical College	Cincinnati	1836		1880		Also known as the Cincinnati Literary and Scientific Institute
Ohio	Physio-Medical Institute	Cincinnati	1859		1865		
Ohio	Presbyterian Hospital and Woman's Medical College	Cincinnati	1891	1892	1895		1895 merged with Woman's Medical College of Ohio to form Laura Memorial Woman's Medical College
Ohio	Pulte Medical College	Cincinnati	1872	1873	1910		Homeopathic. 1910 merged with the Cleveland Homeopathic Medical College to form the Cleveland-Pulte Medical College
Ohio	Starling Medical College	Columbus	1847	1848	1907		1847 absorbed Medical Department of Willoughby University, 1892 absorbed Columbus Medical College, 1907 merged with Ohio Medical University to form the Starling-Ohio Medical College
Ohio	Starling-Ohio Medical College	Columbus	1907	1908	1914		1907 formed by merger of Starling Medical College and Ohio Medical University, 1914 became Ohio State University College of Medicine
Ohio	Toledo Medical College, Medical Department Toledo University	Toledo	1883	1883	1914		
Ohio	Toledo School of Medicine	Toledo	1878		1878		Did not grant degrees, offered instruction only
Ohio	University of Wooster Medical Department	Cleveland	1864	1865	1881		1864 Charity Hospital Medical College, 1869 University of Wooster Medical Department, 1881 faculty split to either join the Cleveland Medical College to form Western Reserve University Medical Department or reopen the University of Wooster Medical Department
Ohio	Willoughby University Medical Department	Willoughby	1835		1847		1847 merged with Starling Medical College
Ohio	Woman's Medical College of Cincinnati	Cincinnati	1887	1888	1895		1895 merged with Presbyterian Hospital and Woman's Medical College to form the Laura Memorial Woman's Medical College
Ohio	Zanesville Academy of Medicine	Zanesville	1877		1881		Offered a written and oral examination for certificate issuance
Oklahoma	Oral Roberts University School of Medicine	Tulsa	1978		1990	MD	Closed due to financial difficulties
Oklahoma	Epworth College of Medicine	Oklahoma City	1904	1907	1910		
Oklahoma	Oklahoma Medical College	Oklahoma City	1907		1909		
Oklahoma	Twentieth Century Physio-Medical College	Guthrie	1900		1904		Fraudulent
Oregon	Willamette University College of Medicine	Salem	1865	1867	1913		1878–95 Willamette University Medical Department located in Portland, in 1913 merged with the University of Oregon Medical Department
Pennsylvania	American University of Pennsylvania (Eclectic)	Philadelphia	1867		1880		Fraudulent
Pennsylvania	Atlantic School of Osteopathy	Wilkes Barre	1898		1906		moved to Buffalo, NY, then merged with A.T. Still University
Pennsylvania	Eclectic Medical College of Pennsylvania	Philadelphia	1856		1880		Became fraudulent
Pennsylvania	Franklin Medical College	Philadelphia	1847		1852		
Pennsylvania	Hahnemann Medical College of Philadelphia	Philadelphia	1866	1868	1869		1869 merged into Homeopathic Medical College of Pennsylvania but retained name
Pennsylvania	Lincoln University Medical Department	Oxford	1870		1872		
Pennsylvania	Medical College of Pennsylvania	Philadelphia	1850	1852	1995	MD	1850 Female Medical College of Pennsylvania, 1867 Woman's Medical College of Pennsylvania, 1970 Medical College of Pennsylvania, 1995 merged with Hahnemann Medical College to form MCP Hahnemann School of Medicine of Allegheny University of the Health Sciences
Pennsylvania	Medico-Chirurgical College of Philadelphia	Philadelphia	1881	1882	1916		1916 became Graduate School of Medicine of the University of Pennsylvania
Pennsylvania	North American Academy of the Homeopathic Healing Art	Allentown	1835		1841		
Pennsylvania	Penn Medical University	Philadelphia	1855		1881		1867–1874 suspended
Pennsylvania	Pennsylvania Medical College	Philadelphia	1839		1863		1839 Medical Department Pennsylvania College, 1859 absorbed Philadelphia College of Medicine and Surgery, 1863 absorbed by Eclectic Medical College of Philadelphia
Pennsylvania	Philadelphia College of Medicine and Surgery	Philadelphia	1846		1859		1859 merged with Pennsylvania Medical College
Pennsylvania	Philadelphia University of Medicine and Surgery	Philadelphia	1853		1880		1853 American College of Medicine in Philadelphia and the Eclectic Medical College of Philadelphia, 1856 Eclectic Medical College of Philadelphia, 1863 absorbed Pennsylvania Medical College, 1865 Philadelphia University of Medicine and Surgery, fraudulent in its last few years
Pennsylvania	Thompsonian Medical College	Allentown	1904		1904		Fraudulent
Puerto Rico	School of Tropical Medicine (Escuela de Medicina Tropical)	San Juan	1926		1949		1949 Integrated with University of Puerto Rico School of Medicine
South Carolina	Charleston Medical School	Charleston	1894		1895		
South Carolina	Medical College of the State of South Carolina	Charleston	1832		1838		1838 merged with Medical College of South Carolina but retained name
South Carolina	University of South Carolina Medical Department	Columbia	1866		1876		
Tennessee	Chattanooga Medical College	Chattanooga	1889	1890	1910		1889 Medical Department of Grant University, 1908 University of Chattanooga Medical College
Tennessee	Chattanooga National Medical College	Chattanooga	1899		1904		African American
Tennessee	College of Physicians and Surgeons	Memphis	1906	1907	1911		Also known as University of Memphis Medical Department, 1911 absorbed by University of Tennessee Medical Department
Tennessee	Eclectic Medical Institute	Memphis	1857		1861		1857 Botanic Medical College, 1859 Eclectic Medical Institute
Tennessee	Hannibal Medical College	Memphis	1889		1896		No evidence of graduates
Tennessee	Jefferson Medical Association	Dandridge	1854		1875		Examining board only
Tennessee	Knoxville College Medical Department	Knoxville	1895		1900		African American
Tennessee	Knoxville Medical College	Knoxville	1900	1900	1910		African American
Tennessee	Lincoln Memorial University Medical Department	Knoxville	1889	1890	1914		1889 Tennessee Medical College, 1906 affiliated with Medical Department of Lincoln Memorial University, 1909 Lincoln Memorial University Medical Department, 1914 merged into University of Tennessee College of Medicine
Tennessee	Medical Department University of Tennessee	Nashville	1876	1877	1911	MD	1876 Nashville Medical College, 1879 Medical Department University of Tennessee, 1909 formed joint Medical Department with University of Nashville, 1911 merged with University of Nashville Medical Department, absorbed the College of Physicians and Surgeons, moved from Nashville to Memphis, became University of Tennessee College of Medicine
Tennessee	Memphis Hospital Medical College	Memphis	1880	1881	1913		1913 merged with University of Tennessee College of Medicine
Tennessee	Memphis Medical College	Memphis	1854		1873		1854 Medical Department Cumberland University, 1861–1868 suspended
Tennessee	Shelby Medical College	Nashville	1858		1862		
Tennessee	University of Nashville Medical Department	Nashville	1850	1852	1911		1874–1895 united with Medical Department Vanderbilt University, 1909–1911 united with Medical Department of the University of Tennessee, 1911 merged with Medical Department of the University of Tennessee to form University of Tennessee College of Medicine
Tennessee	University of the South Medical Department (Sewanee Medical College)	Sewanee	1892	1893	1909		
Tennessee	University of West Tennessee College of Medicine and Surgery	Memphis	1900	1904	1923		African American. 1907 moved from Jackson to Memphis
Texas	College of Physicians and Surgeons	Dallas	1903	1904	1910		1903 Bell Medical College, 1905 College of Physicians and Surgeons
Texas	Dallas Medical College	Dallas	1900	1901	1904		Medical Department of Trinity University. 1904 merged into Baylor University College of Medicine
Texas	Fort Worth School of Medicine, Medical Department of Texas Christian University	Fort Worth	1894	1895	1918		1894 Fort Worth University School of Medicine, 1911 Medical Department of the Texas Christian University, 1918 merged with Baylor University College of Medicine
Texas	Gate City Medical College	Texarkana	1902	1904	1911		1902 outgrowth of Medical Department of Sulpher Rock College, 1908–1910 extinct after selling diplomas, 1910 reopened in Dallas, 1911 extinct after selling diplomas
Texas	Physio-Medical College of Texas	Dallas	1902	1902	1908		1908 merged with College of Medicine and Surgery, Physio-Medical, of Chicago
Texas	Southern Methodist University College of Medicine	Dallas	1903	1904	1915		1903 Southwestern University Medical College, 1911 Southern Methodist University Medical Department
Texas	Texas Medical College and Hospital	Galveston	1864		1891		1864 Galveston Medical College, 1873 Texas Medical College and Hospital, 1881–1888 extinct, 1888 reorganized
Texas	University of Medicine and Surgery	Dallas	1906		1906		Held no sessions
Texas	University of San Antonio Medical Department	San Antonio	1888		1888		No instruction given
Utah	Medical Institution of Morgan City	Morgan City	1880		1883		
Vermont	Castleton Medical College	Castleton	1818		1861		1818 Castleton Medical Academy, 1821 Vermont Academy of Medicine, 1838–1839 suspended, 1841 Castleton Medical College
Vermont	Trinity University College of Medicine and Surgery of the State of Vermont	Bennington	1889		Unknown		Fraudulent. May have been connected to the Medical and Surgical Institute of Buffalo (NY) and the University of New Hampshire Department of Medicine
Vermont	Union Medical Institute	Newbury	1887		Unknown		Fraudulent
Vermont	Vermont Medical College	Woodstock	1827		1856		1827 Clinical School of Medicine, 1835 Vermont Medical College
Vermont	Vermont Medical College	Rutland	1883		1893		Fraudulent
Virginia	Scientific and Eclectic Medical Institute of Virginia	Petersburg	1847		1851		
Virginia	Randolph Macon College Medical Department	Prince Edward Court House	1840		1855		
Virginia	University College of Medicine	Richmond	1893	1894	1913		1893 College of Physicians and Surgeons, 1894 University College of Medicine, 1913 merged with Medical College of Virginia
Virginia	Medical School of the Valley of Virginia; Winchester Medical College	Winchester	1826		1861		1829–1850 suspended Campus burned by Union troops during the Civil War, in retaliation for the school having used bodies of Black slaves killed during John Brown's 1859 raid on Harpers Ferry.
Washington	Northwestern College of Biochemistry	Spokane	1889		1893		Fraudulent. 1889 Washington Biochemic Medical College at North Yakima, 1892 moved to Spokane and became Northwestern College of Biochemistry
Washington	University of Spokane Falls College of Medicine	Spokane	1890		1890		Held no sessions
Washington	University of Washington Medical Department	Seattle	1885		1885		Held no sessions
Wisconsin	Milwaukee College of Physicians and Surgeons	Milwaukee	1881		1883		Fraudulent. Also known as Coney Medical Institute
Wisconsin	Milwaukee Medical College	Milwaukee	1894	1895	1913		1907 affiliated with Marquette University, 1913 buildings leased to Marquette University School of Medicine
Wisconsin	Wisconsin College of Physicians and Surgeons	Milwaukee	1893	1894	1913		1913 property transferred to Marquette University School of Medicine
Wisconsin	Wisconsin Eclectic Medical School	Milwaukee	1894		1898		Peddled diplomas, never graduated a class

== See also ==
- Medical school in the United States
- Medical education in the United States
- List of medical schools in the United States
