= Journal of Osteopathy =

- Discipline: Osteopathy
- Language: English

Publication details
- History: 1894–1964
- Frequency: Monthly

Standard abbreviations
- ISO 4: J. Osteopat. (Kirksville)
- NLM: J. Osteopathy (Kirksvill)

Indexing
- CODEN: JOOSAH
- OCLC no.: 02263056

The Journal of Osteopathy was a monthly medical journal that was first published in May 1894 in Kirksville, Missouri by the American School of Osteopathy. It was the first regular publication about the field of osteopathy. Andrew Taylor Still was one of the key contributors to the journal. Its first editor-in-chief was Jenette H. Bolles. It was published until 1964.
