= Jenette H. Bolles =

American medical doctor

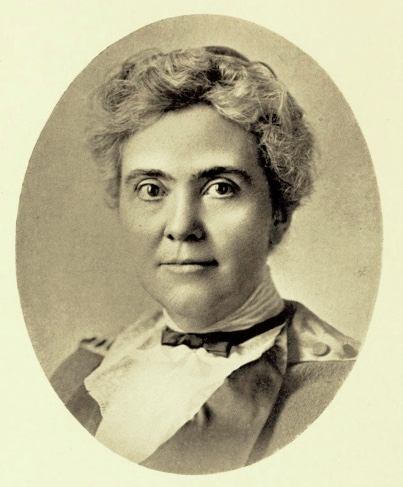
Jenette H. Bolles, Representative Women of Colorado, 1914

Jenette Hubbard Bolles (September 12, 1862 – February 23, 1930), also known as Nettie Bolles, was an American medical doctor. She was the first woman to study and have a career as an osteopath and the first osteopath in the state of Colorado. She held a number of positions in the medical field and was a suffragette.

== Early life and education ==
Jenette Hubbard was born on September 12, 1862 in Douglas County, Kansas. Her parents were Martha Jenette (Merrill) Hubbard and David Hubbard. She attended public school in Olathe, Kansas before studying and graduating from the University of Kansas with a B.S. degree in 1885.

Bolles became interested in osteopathy based upon the treatment her family received by Dr. Andrew Still. Her father had been seriously wounded by gunfire and left for dead during border skirmishes in the 1850s and Still removed the bullet and restored her father's health. She was also satisfied later by the treatment that her mother received after she was paralyzed from a fall. She then decided to further her education by studying osteopathy. She graduated from the American School of Osteopathy in Kirksville, Missouri in 1894. In 1908, she received a master's degree from the University of Denver. She was a member of the Pi Beta Phi sorority.

== Career ==
There is a profession… which is peculiarly adapted to women, which is fascinating, satisfactory, and directly beneficial to mankind… it is Osteopathy.

—Jenette "Nettie" Bolles, DO

Upon graduation from the School of Osteopathy, she was accepted as a member of the faculty and became a professor of anatomy. She established a career as an osteopath and was the first woman to sustain her career. There were other women in her graduating class, but she was the only woman to pursue a long-standing career. She practice osteopathy, wrote about it, and taught it. She was also the first female educator in the field of osteopathy. She specialized in diseases of the urinary system, bladder, and kidneys. She was the first editor and publisher of the Journal of Osteopathy.

In 1896 she moved to Denver, becoming the state's first osteopath. Bolles founded the Western Institute for Osteopathy in 1897. The school, a charter member of the Associated Colleges of Osteopathy, maintained a course of four-five month terms. She was the president and her husband was the dean. It was named Bolles Institute of Osteopathy after her husband received his degree in 1898, and then in 1900 it was named College of Osteopathy. The school was transferred in 1904 to the American School of Osteopathy in Missouri. She held state and national positions in the medical field. In 1910, she addressed the National Association at San Francisco. Bolles served on the Colorado Board of Medical Examiners, the first osteopath to do so. She was offered the appointment to the State Medical Board by Governor John F. Shafroth, but she turned it down because they did not recognize osteopathy.

She was a member of the national, state, and local osteopathic associations. She was the founding president of the American Colleges of Osteopathy in 1898. The prior year, she was the vice president of the American Association for the Advancement of Osteopathy, now known as the American Osteopathic Association (AOA). She became the first woman to be nominated for president of the AOA in 1917. She received the AOA Distinguished Service Certificate for "Pioneering in Osteopathy as a Profession for Women" in 1925. Bolles helped found the Osteopathic Women's National Association and served as president three times.

== Personal life ==
She married Newton A. Bolles in 1887, who was also a graduate of the School of Osteopathy and received his degree in 1898. They had two daughters, Helen Louise, born in 1898 and Ester, born in 1900.

Bolles was an active member of the Mother's Congress, now called the Parent Teachers Association, and served on the Child Hygiene Committee. She served as the representative for Colorado at the final International Congress of Child Welfare in Washington, D.C. She was a suffragette, Congregationalist, and a Republican.

She died on February 23, 1930. Her daughter Ester, her son-in-law C. Robert Starks, and grandson C. Robert Starks Jr. all became osteopaths.
