= William Smith (physician) =

American physician

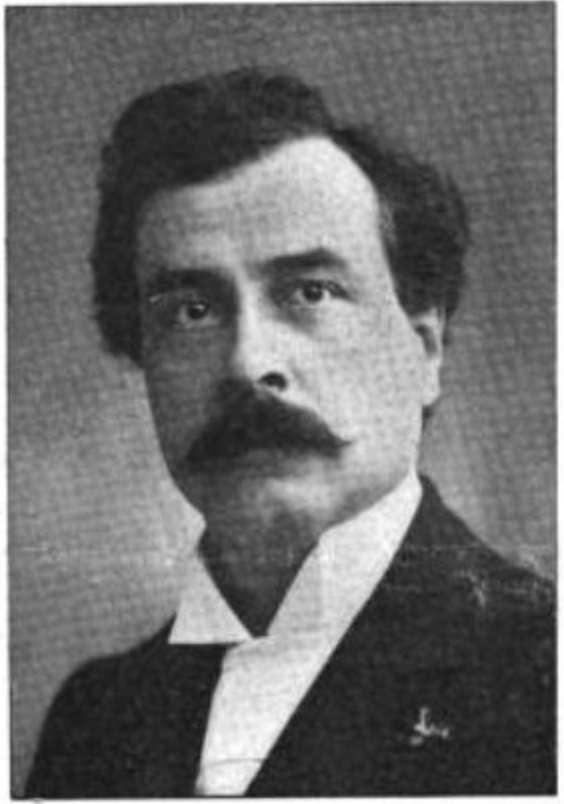
- Dr. William Smith an early Osteopath physician and associate of Andrew Still
- Education: Doctor of Osteopathic Medicine
- Alma mater: American School of Osteopathy, Royal College of Physicians
- Occupation: Osteopathic physician

William Smith (1862–1912) was a Scottish American physician who was an early proponent of osteopathic medicine and an early associate of Andrew Still in Missouri.

William Smith was born in 1862 Jamaica while his Scottish father was working as an engineer on the island. Smith grew up in Scotland attended medical school in Edinburgh, completing his medical training at the Royal College of Physicians. He practiced medicine in Europe before attempting to start a practice in Brooklyn, New York. After finding limited success in New York, he then traveled west and met Andrew Still in Missouri in June 1892. After investigating Still's claims, Smith agreed to serve as the first anatomy professor at Still's new school, which was opening in September, and Smith helped in the founding of several other osteopathic institutions. In 1893 Smith received the first doctor of osteopathy degree from Still's school. In 1900 Smith briefly served as president of the Atlantic School of Osteopathy in Pennsylvania. In 1912 he returned to Scotland after several unsuccessful attempts at starting a practice in the United States. He died of pneumonia in Dundee, Scotland in 1912.
