= A.T. Still University School of Osteopathic Medicine in Arizona =

Private medical school in Mesa, Arizona, US

Coordinates: 33°22′58″N 111°42′18″W

A.T. Still University - School of Osteopathic Medicine in Arizona
- Type: Private medical school
- Established: 2007
- President: Craig M. Phelps
- Dean: Sharon Obadia
- Academic staff: 176 full-time 469 part-time
- Students: 425
- Location: Mesa, Arizona, United States
- Campus: 22 acres (8.9 ha)
- Website: atsu.edu/soma

A.T. Still University - School of Osteopathic Medicine in Arizona (ATSU-SOMA) is a private medical school in Mesa, Arizona. It was established in 2007 as the Arizona campus of A.T. Still University. A.T. Still University (ATSU) is the original founding institution of osteopathic healthcare, established in 1892 by Andrew Taylor Still in Kirksville, Missouri.

SOMA is accredited by the Commission on Osteopathic College Accreditation (COCA) of the American Osteopathic Association (AOA).

== Campus ==
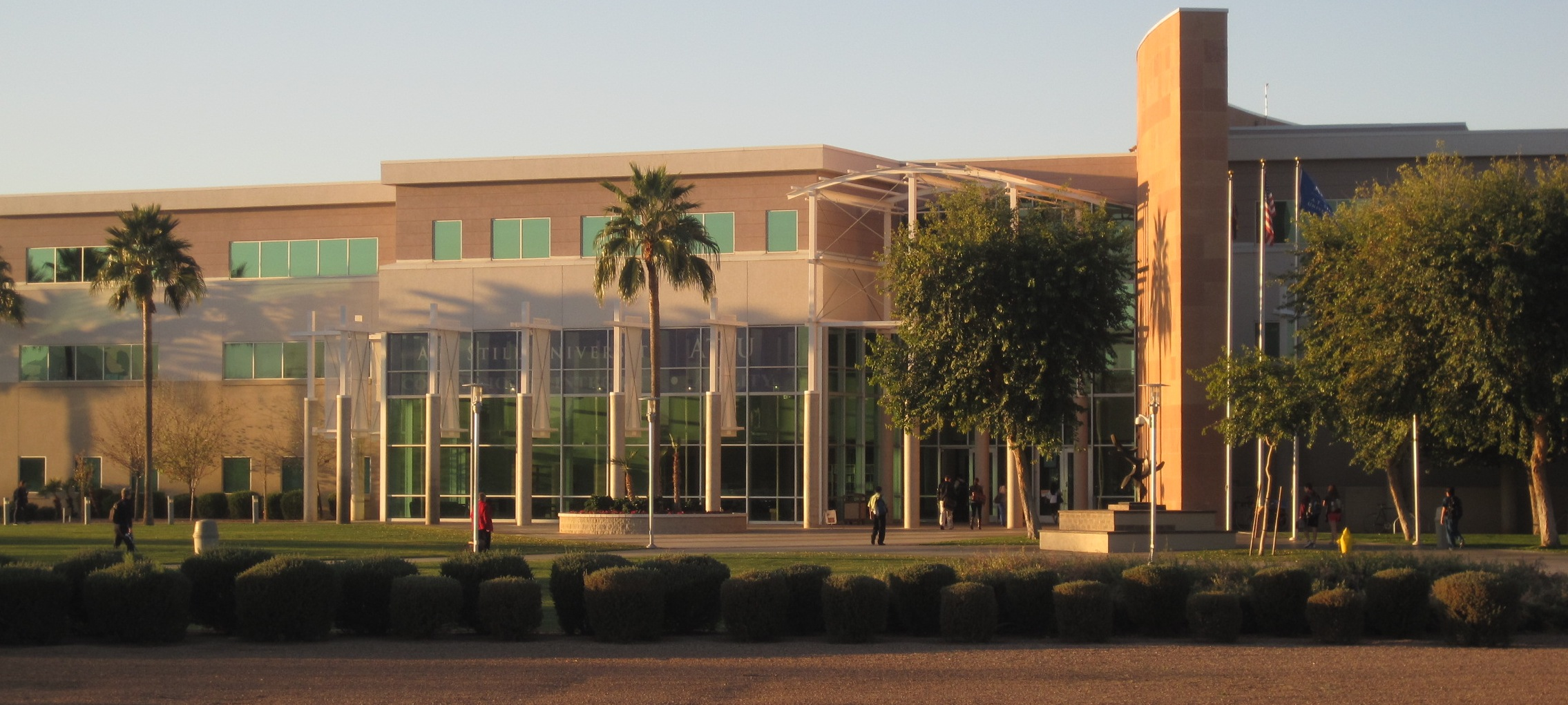
ATSU SOMA Main Building

The medical program operates out of a 100,000-square-foot (9,300 m^{2}) building on the 22-acre (89,000 m^{2}) campus of A.T. Still University in Mesa. The campus is the anchor of the Arizona Health & Technology Park, a 132-acre (0.53 km^{2}) education, healthcare, and technology triangle owned by ATSU and Vanguard Health Systems. The master plan for the new park includes hospitals, long-term care facilities, professional offices, and product development research facilities.

The campus is also home to the ATSU-Arizona School of Health Sciences, ATSU-Arizona School of Dentistry and Oral Health, and the 32,000-square-foot (3,000 m^{2}) East Valley Family YMCA.

== Academics ==
The school offers the following Doctoral degree programs:

Doctor of Audiology

Doctor of Dental Medicine

Doctor of Occupational Therapy

Doctor of Physical Therapy

Doctor of Osteopathic Medicine

The school offers the following Master's degree programs:

Master of Science in Biomedical Sciences

Master of Science in Orthodontics

Master of Science in Occupational Therapy

Master of Science in Physician Assistant Studies

Master of Science in Speech-Language Pathology

== Doctor of Osteopathic Medicine ==
The curriculum at ATSU-SOMA previously had a unique approach in that all of the clinical education is based at one of twelve community health centers throughout the country.

=== Training ===
ATSU-SOMA uses the Clinical Presentation Educational Model which teaches that there are about 120 different ways that a patient can present themself to a physician. The teaching method was based on a method developed in 1994 by the University of Calgary. Basic sciences are coupled with clinical sciences so that the students have a more comprehensive and practical foundation for each medical discipline. The curriculum design emphasizes clinical competencies which allows students to enter residency programs with greater experience with chronic disease than students educated in the majority of tertiary care-oriented academic health centers.

=== Community Health Center locations ===
ATSU-SOMA previously had a unique approach in that the first year was spent at the Mesa campus and the last three years at one of many community health centers. Currently, however, the medical school has converted back to the traditional approach of the first two years being spent in the classroom and the second two years in clinics. As of 2021, ATSU-SOMA offered 16 community health center opportunities:

- Arizona
  - North Country Healthcare – Flagstaff, Arizona
  - Adelante Healthcare – Phoenix, Arizona
  - El Rio Community Health Center – Tucson, Arizona
- California
  - Community Health Center of the Central Coast, Inc – Santa Maria, California
  - San Ysidro Health Center – San Ysidro, California
  - Family Healthcare Network – Tulare County, California
- Hawaii
  - Waianae Coast Comprehensive Health Center – Wai'anae, Oahu, Hawaii
- Illinois
  - Southern Illinois Healthcare Foundation – Centreville, Illinois
  - Near North Health Service Corporation – Chicago, Illinois
- New York
  - Sunset Park Family Health Center – Brooklyn, New York
- Ohio
  - HealthSource of Ohio – Mt Orab, Ohio
- Oregon
  - Northwest Regional Primary Care Association – Portland, Oregon
- Pennsylvania
  - The Wright Center for Community Health – Scranton, Pennsylvania
- South Carolina
  - Beaufort-Jasper-Hampton Comprehensive Health Services – Ridgeland, South Carolina
- Washington
  - Health Point (previously Community Health Centers of King County) – Suburban Seattle, Washington

== See also ==
- A.T. Still University
- List of medical schools in the United States
