= Waiʻanae Coast Comprehensive Health Center =

Community health center in Hawaii, United States

- Industry: Federally Qualified Health Center (FQHC)
- Founded: 1972
- Headquarters: Waiʻanae, US
- Number of locations: 1 main center and four satellite clinics
- Area served: Waiʻanae to Kapolei, Ewa Beach to Waipahu
- Key people: Richard Bettini, CEO, Stephen Bradley, MD, Chief Medical Officer, Scott Padovan, MD, ER Director, Regina P. Nguyen, DDS, Dental Director
- Services: Ambulatory Health Care Facilities
- Owner: Waiʻanae District Comprehensive Health and Hospital Board, Inc.
- Number of employees: 540
- Website: www.wcchc.com

Waiʻanae Coast Comprehensive Health Center (WCCHC), founded in 1972, is a community health center located in Waiʻanae on the west side of Oʻahu in the state of Hawaii. When it was first established, WCCHC had one doctor and five staff members. WCCHC has then expanded to over 540 employees at the main center in Waiʻanae and four satellite clinics in surrounding areas, including Kapolei and Waipahu.

In 2024, WCCHC served over 36,000 patients. In addition to its conventional primary medical and dental care, WCCHC offers exercise/fitness programs utilizing a gym and walking paths, a farmers' market in Waiʻanae and Kapolei, a restaurant, and Native Hawaiian healing services. The native Hawaiian healing center was the first of its kind in the nation. WCCHC also has a 24-hour emergency department, adult day care, health career training, mental health, substance abuse treatment, nutrition counseling, and transportation.

== Clinics and services ==
=== Main campus ===
- Harry and Jeanette Weinberg Dental Clinic – In 1994, the Weinberg Foundation donated $800,000 towards the construction of the laboratory and dental building. The new facility expanded the Health Center's capability to provide additional dental care to the community and additional workspace for laboratory services.
- Harry and Jeanette Weinberg Family Building – Completed in July 2008. Houses pediatrics and women's health practices.
- Malama Ola – The Malama Ola (integrative medicine) Clinic offers primary care, pain management, lifestyle enhancement, acupuncture, chronic disease management, sports medicine, employee wellness and research activities. A fitness gym is also a part of the Clinic.
- Makai Clinic – Offers primary care pediatric services.
- Mauka Clinic
- Ohana Clinic
- Specialty Clinic
- Emergency Medicine – Offers 24-hour emergency, lab, and x-ray services.
- Native Hawaiian Healing – Native Hawaiian Healing Practitioners provide traditional healing services from this building. A Kupuna Council (Native Hawaiian elders who are also Native Hawaiian traditional healers) provides input on cultural and traditional services to be offered through the Health Center.
- WIC (Women, Infant and Children) Program – W.I.C. (Women, Infants & Children) is a supplemental nutrition program which provides nourishing supplemental foods, nutrition education, breastfeeding promotion and health and social service referrals. Participants of WIC are either pregnant, breastfeeding, or postpartum women, and infants and children under age five who meet income guidelines and have a medical or nutritional risk.
- Behavioral Health Services – Behavioral health services for adults and children are provided by psychiatrists and psychologists and include psychiatric diagnostic or evaluative interview procedures, insight-oriented, behavior modifying and/or supportive psychotherapy, and medication management. Additional behavioral health services are integrated with the primary care clinics.
- Adult Day Care – Adult Day Care service is available for adults, 18 years and older, in need of protection, supervision and/or socialization. Services are provided in a home-like setting and include exercise, arts and crafts, music, games and meals.

=== Other locations ===
- Waiola Clinic – Offers primary care services. Located in Waiʻanae Shopping Center.
- James and Abigail Campbell Clinic – Offers primary care services. Located in Nānākuli, HI.
- Kapolei Health Care Center – Offers primary care services. Located in Kapolei, HI.
- Waipahu Family Health Center – Offers primary care services. Located in Waipahu, HI.
- Waiʻanae Health Academy (WHA) – The Waianae Health Academy was formed in 1992 as a partnership between Leeward Community College, Kapiʻolani Community College and the WCCHC. It began in response to a request from the WCCHC Board of Directors that the center provide training opportunities for Waiʻanae Coast residents. Since that time, the WHA has been providing health career certificate programs such as Nurse Aide, Medical Assisting, Practical Nursing, Community Health Worker, Phlebotomy, Dental Assisting, Medical Reception, Medical Coding, Pharmacy Technician, Occupational Therapy Assistant, Plant Landscaping, Agricultural Technology, and Pre-Health/Bridge courses. The Waianae Health Academy also offers comprehensive Haumana Kokua (student support services) to assist people enter and succeed in the programs they choose. This support includes assistance in completing the application process, applying for scholarships and financial aid, and having access to an assigned Education Specialist who is available to help the student find resources which address other barriers to education.
- Substance Abuse Program
- Pearl City Hale Adult Day Care
- Hale Kakoʻo Adult Day Care – Hale Kakoʻo is an adult care facility in ʻĀlewa Heights, a neighborhood in Honolulu, for people with Alzheimer's disease and dementia. It is the only adult day care in Hawaiʻi offering night care, filling a need for such patients and providing respite for their caregivers.
- Accounting and Purchasing
- Human Resources
- Health Patient Accounting Services (HPAS) – Offers practice management services, including claims and statement processing.

== History of the WCCHC ==
=== Before the health center, 1946–1970 ===
1946: Healthcare on the Waiʻanae Coast was provided by the Waiʻanae Sugar Mill dispensary. The population averaged 6,000 people. When Waiʻanae's sugar mill closed, leaving Waianae Coast residents without medical facilities. Residents were forced to travel to Honolulu to see a doctor; the journey took 1 1/2 hours each way. Only the very ill sought care.

1964: State statistics identified Waiʻanae as having a poor health and disease profile and a high infant mortality rate. The State began delivering part-time maternal and infant care from a small building in Nānākuli. There were two part-time MDs practicing in Waiʻanae. Kaiser Clinic opened in Māʻili (for Kaiser members).

1966: Concerned residents formed a Health Task Force (HTF) to plan for better health services and more doctors on the Coast to meet the needs of the growing population, then estimated at 18,000 people.

1968: The federal Department of Housing and Urban Development designated Waiʻanae and Nānākuli for the Model Cities Program.

1969: The State Legislature guaranteed a salary of $25,000 per year to any doctor who would practice in Waiʻanae (Act 299). The HTF was successful in bringing a doctor to the Coast who practiced in the Māʻili Ola Clinic. The doctor left within the year. The HTF, with assistance from the University of Hawaiʻi School of Medicine, developed a program concept that identified the needs of the community: a comprehensive health center, home health care, and a hospital. This document was the basis for acquiring Model Cities Program aid. The HTF incorporated into the Waiʻanae District Comprehensive Health and Hospital Board, Inc. The Board was intended to be the policy-making body for the Waianae Coast Comprehensive Health Center.

1970: A public election was held for the first Board of Directors of the Waiʻanae District Comprehensive Health and Hospital Board, Inc. Membership in the corporation was and continues to be open to all residents 18 years and older who have an interest in health. The Model Cities Program provided $84,000 in seed money for the Waiʻanae Coast Comprehensive Health Center project, and the board hired a core planning staff in late 1970. The planning objective was to secure land and obtain funds to build and operate the health center. The health center site was acquired through the Hawaiian Home Lands and Department of Land and Natural Resources. Funding to build the first phase of the health center was obtained through the Model Cities Program. Project Directors were Robert Lawton and Ray Lilly. There were two more doctors practicing in Waiʻanae—still not enough for the growing population of some 24,000 people.

=== A difficult beginning, 1972–1974 ===
1972: Ground was broken to build the first phase of the health center. In October, Dr. Paul Barry, the center's first employed doctor, and a staff of five, began delivery of services from a temporary location across from Waiʻanae's McDonald's restaurant. Waiʻanae qualified as a medically underserved area under federal guidelines and operational funds were granted through the United States Public Health Service (PHS). The health center's first Administrator was David Pali.

1973: In August, Phase I was completed and services were delivered from the health center's present location. the center had two physicians, who worked 9 to 5, Monday through Friday. Shortly after opening, there was a period of turmoil when the PHS stopped funding the center until it complied with certain conditions. The Board included representation from the University of Hawaiʻi School of Medicine and School of Public Health, and the Department of Health. the center had 33 employees. Administrators included Clem Hauanio (Acting), Gilbert Bishop (Interim), and Ed Kelleher.

1974: USPHS funds were reinstated in February 1974, upon compliance by the center's Board of Directors. the center's new Administrator was Brian Riordan.

=== The health center is firmly established, 1975–1984 ===
1975: In January, Dr. Frederick Dodge was hired to be the center's first Medical Director. Weekend emergency room services began, supported by a State Department of Health subsidy.

1976: The outpatient clinic was built and family practice services to the community continued to increase. Administrators were Edgar Molleta/Diane Muri (Acting) and John Volanti. The center's Radiology (x-ray) department opened.

1977–1984: The health center enjoyed continued growth. The WIC (Women, Infants, Children) Program was initiated. Three portable buildings were added. More services and programs were added to serve a growing patient population. the center named Dr. Richard Banner as its new Medical Director. Two babies were delivered in the emergency room during Hurricane Iwa in 1982 (while the center operated on emergency power). The back driveway was completed by military personnel as a firebreak, after a fire threatened the safety of the center. Staffing was increased to 160 employees. Michael Tweedell was named as Administrator.

=== A period of growth, 1985–1993 ===
1985–1986: The First Annual Run For Your Life 2-mile walk/4-mile run was held. Proceeds were used to purchase emergency equipment. With assistance from Aloha United Way, the center's emergency department opened 24-hours a day, 365 days a year.

1987: The first class of nurses’ aides graduated. the center celebrated its 15th anniversary. the center began Pacific Regional Training activities to Palau, Guam, Pohnpei, the Marshall Islands, and Saipan. The Adult Day Care Program was started.

1989: the center's Waiʻanae Diet pilot project was launched.

1990: Chevron USA began their scholarship program with the center, awarding 19 scholarships. the center received a grant from the National Cancer Institute (NCI) in response to the high incidence and mortality rates of breast and cervical cancer among Hawaiian women. Patient transportation services began through funding assistance from the Office on Aging. the center began Outreach Services for the homeless and AIDS/HIV patients. Hawaii Patient Accounting Services, Inc. (HPAS), a for-profit subsidiary, began providing billing and collection services for the center.

1991: The Baby S.A.F.E. program was started to provide substance abuse prevention & treatment services to pregnant women. A Health Emergency Liaison Program (HELP) was initiated to provide 24-hour assistance to families and victims experiencing crises in the center's emergency department. the center began outstationing Medical Income Maintenance Workers to minimize barriers to patients needing financial assistance. The Waiʻanae Diet pilot project results were published in the American Journal of Clinical Nutrition and the project began receiving national and international attention. the center opened its first satellite clinic in the Nānākuli Pacific Shopping Mall.

1992: Waiʻanae Community Health Academy (Ola Loa Ka Naʻauao) was realized with the signing of a cooperative agreement between Kapiʻolani Community College, Leeward Community College, and the center. the center was one of three clinics selected to participate in a 5-year, $6 million grant from the Kellogg Foundation to support community-based health professional education by the University of Hawaiʻi Schools of Medicine, Nursing, Public Health, and Social Work. the center was the first outpatient facility on Oahu to use Eminase, a drug for breaking up blood clots in heart attack patients. Major renovations began on the emergency department. In September, Hurricane Iniki struck the islands and the center once again operated on emergency power. the center celebrated its 20th anniversary.

1993: The first Aloha United Way Day of Caring activity with Hawaiian Dredging and Construction was held, with equipment and labor donated to complete unfunded capital projects for the center.

=== Adjusting to a changing healthcare environment, 1994–1997 ===
1994: the center opened its second satellite clinic, located in Waiʻanae Town. State Medicaid health reform (Med-QUEST) pushed the center to move toward Managed Care. The enter's Administrator and Medical Director resigned to take positions with AlohaCare; an HMO formed by Hawaii's community health centers in response to QUEST. the center named Richard Bettini as its Executive Director and Dr. Melanie Ho as its Interim Medical Director.

1995: To ease crowded space, the center's Business Services, Personnel, Patient Services, and HPAS were relocated to leased space in the Waiʻanae Mall. the center received a grant from the Harry & Jeanette Weinberg Foundation to build a Laboratory and Dental building. A grant from the James & Abigail Campbell Family Foundation provided significant expansion for the center's Nānākuli Clinic, now named the James and Abigail Campbell Clinic.

1996: the center's Adult Day Care Department was awarded a contract to manage the Hale Kakoʻo Respite Center in ʻĀlewa Heights. The Respite Center offers day respite care and provides a program to enhance the lives of memory-impaired adults who have Alzheimer's disease and other related disorders. In a partnership with the State Department of Health, the center assumed operation of the Rural Oʻahu Family Planning Project in Waipahu. The Project provides family planning services and expanded primary care. Dr. Richard Friedman joined the health center as medical director. The Army MAST services replaced their smaller helicopters with the larger Blackhawk helicopter to handle the center's emergency evacuations. Pacific Business News names the center as the largest Hawaii non-profit service provider in the State. The first Tom Dwyer Memorial Scholarship was awarded (Dr. Dwyer was an emergency department physician).

1997: the center opened an Urgent Care and Occupational Medicine clinic. An affiliation agreement with Kapiʻolani Health was signed. The agreement included a Kapiʻolani perinatologist to serve as consultant for Waiʻanae obstetrical services, and for the center's Medical Director to assist Kapiʻolani with its ambulatory care services redesign; a joint exchange of management systems; joint planning teams to work on preventive health initiatives; facility improvements at Waianae; and the development of research activities. The center received the Waiʻanae Rotary Employer of the Year award.

=== Providing care into the new millennium, 1998–2000 ===
1998: the center names Dr. Gerard Akaka as its Medical Director. E Komo Mai – the center's telephone help line offering health information and advice to callers – is launched with the help of a grant from the Chamber of Commerce of Hawaiʻi and Kapiʻolani Children's Miracle Network. Center holds its First Annual Golf Tournament fundraiser and raises more than $5,000 to provide health services. Hawaiian Dredging volunteers continue to support the center as their AUW Day of Caring project.

1999: An Infant Intensive Care System is installed in the center's 24-hour Emergency Department, providing state-of-the-art care services on site. A grant from the First Hawaiian Bank Foundation provides the funding. the center opened an integrative medicine clinic, integrating Western healing technology with native Hawaiian and other healing practices. the center moves to high-tech with the installation of telemedicine equipment which allows providers and students access to specialists and services at the University of Hawaiʻi.

2000: This year marked the center's 15th Annual Run For Your Life fundraiser. The Event raises approximately $10,000 annually to assist the center in purchasing supplies and equipment. The center's Adult Day Care celebrated its 13th anniversary. MAST continues into its 27th year of service at the center. the center now employs over 350 people, many who are residents of the community. The Waiʻanae Coast Comprehensive Health Center is community-owned and community-operated non-profit medical facility serving in a Waiʻanae Coast community of some 50,000 residents.

=== Continuing history/heritage, 2001–2007 ===
2001: With the July 11, 2001 kickoff of the health center's capital campaign, led the way through their generous donations. Within 38 days, employees donated an amazing $65,000. The James and Abigail Campbell Foundation is the first major donor of the health center's capital campaign to build a multi-story health and training facility at its main campus. The $500,000 donation will be used specifically for the pediatric floor of the new building. The Waiʻanae Health Academy graduated its 20th Nurse Assistant class.

2002: A call for artists was announced for a design that would represent the health center's capital campaign theme of "Sharing Traditions, Generation to Generation". The design submitted by Sean Browne, Native Hawaiian artist, was selected. His design is of a fountain with three calabashes that represent a family generation of kupuna, makua and keiki. Dr. Ricardo (Ric) Custodio, M.D., M.P.H., is hired as the new medical director. Dr. Custodio is a pediatrician and grew up in Hawaii. He received his undergraduate degree from Stanford University, his medical degree from University of Hawaiʻi and a graduate degree for Harvard University. The Waiʻanae Health Academy celebrates its 10th anniversary. The Academy has trained 20 Nurse Assistant classes, 3 Community Health Worker classes, 14 Early Admission programs (for high school students interested in a health career) and 1 Practical Nursing program. The health center celebrated its 30th anniversary on the grounds of the newly dedicated Native Hawaiian Healing Gardens and Amphitheater. The Chamber of Commerce presented the health center a Noelo Poʻokela award – the Hawaiʻi State Award of Excellence.

2003: After contracting out pharmacy services for many years, the health center decided to operate its own pharmacy – Waiʻanae Professional Pharmacy. The health center was visited by top federal officials from the Department of Health and Human Services, including Dr. Sam Shekar, assistant surgeon general and Elizabeth "Betty" Duke, administrator for the Health Resources and Services Administration. The Honolulu Club generously donated state-of-the-art exercise machines to the health center. The ten FreeMotion Fitness strength training machines are included as part of the Integrative Health Lifestyle Enhancement Program. The health center is the first community health center in the state of Hawaiʻi to implement an electronic medical record system. Two hale, built by master hale builder Francis Senenci of Hana Maui, completed on the grounds of the health center. Hale Hoʻola O Waiʻanae, a traditional Hawaiian hale, is used by Native Hawaiian healing practitioners. Hale Halawai is located in the garden area and used as a gathering/meeting area. The 2nd Annual Waiʻanae Conference on Primary Care and Board Leadership Development was attended by 200 individuals from Hawaiʻi, the continental United States and the Pacific.

2004: The health center won the Leadership Award for Non-Profit Corporations in Hawaii. The award, presented by Pacific Business News, recognized the health center for maintaining a positive financial position for many years by continuously increasing productivity, developing revenue generating services, initiating technological innovations and promoting community involvement. The KidFit program established by Preventive Health Department to address growing obesity rates among children. The program includes fun physical activities such as kick-boxing, weight-strength training, cardio-dance, relay races, etc. Pearl City Adult Day Care Center opens at the Pearl City Hongwanji. This adult day care site is the largest of the other four sites which are located in Waiʻanae, ʻĀlewa Heights, Waialua and Wahiawa.

2005: The health center received federal recognition as a formal research review board to protect and provide oversight for community-based research. The Waipahu Clinic moves into larger facilities, from the Waipahu Civic Center to its new location at the Waipahu Filipino Community (Fil-Com) Center. The health center generated $300,000 at its first fundraising event, A Tribute to the Spirit of Community. The event was held to raise funds for its three-story medical and training building. The event honored Senator Daniel Inouye, Stephen MacMillan (CEO of the James and Abigail Campbell Foundation), Bill Wilson (President of Hawaiian Dredging Construction Company) and Chuck Wothke (one of the founders of the health center). Champion golfer Vijay Singh donates $25,000 to the health center. He was also the winner of the Sony Open.

2006: The health center held a blessing and open house for its newest clinic, Malama Ola, which is a model of clinic redesign providing integrative health services. Services include primary care, acupuncture, nutrition management, behavioral health and a fitness gym. A new employee training graduated competencies program was initiated to focus on upgrading skills and promoting career ladder advancement. The Hawaii Psychological Association awarded the health center its Psychologically Healthy Workplace Award. The health center was ranked as the largest non-profit service provider in the state of Hawaii. The 2nd annual Spirit of Community fundraiser honored Senator Daniel Akaka and his wife Millie Akaka who has served as the Capital Campaign chairs for the health center's capital campaign. Also honored was one of the founders of the health center, Aunty Agnes Cope. Scenic Hawaii presented the health center with the 2006 Betty Crocker Landscape award of excellence in the Professional Gardens category. First Hawaiian Bank Foundation provides a $150,000 grant to the health center for its three-story medical and training building capital campaign. McInerny Foundation grants $100,000 award to the health center's capital campaign.

2007: The Waiʻanae Health Academy increased its reach by partnering with Windward Community College to bring Agricultural Technology Program to the community. WCCHC was also selected to be one of 10 community health centers throughout the nation to house the new medical school program for A.T. Still University School of Osteopathic Medicine in Arizona. Ten medical students began their 3 years of community based training on site in July 2008. Medical student candidates are identified from the community with the hope they will return to practice medical care in their hometown. Kupuna Council and Native Hawaiian Traditional Healers recognized by State Legislature for perpetuating the art of Native Hawaiian Healing. Groundbreaking took place for the 3-story Harry and Jeanette Weinberg Family Medical Building.
