= Craig M. Phelps =

- Education: Doctor of Osteopathic Medicine
- Alma mater: A.T. Still University (DO)
- Occupations: Physician, University President
- Known for: Physician for the NBA Phoenix Suns.

Craig M. Phelps is the president and provost of A.T. Still University, a professional health science school located in Kirksville, Missouri, and Mesa, Arizona. As provost, Dr. Phelps oversees the A.T. Still University School of Osteopathic Medicine in Arizona, Arizona School of Health Sciences and the Arizona School of Dentistry and Oral Health. Phelps graduated medical school from A.T. Still University KCOM in 1984. Dr. Phelps is the recipient of the 2006 KOAA Distinguished Service Award, ATSU’s George Windsor Award in 2007, and Health Care Heroes Finalist in 2008. Also in 2008 he was a Living Tribute Award Recipient.

On February 4, 2012, the board of trustees of A.T. Still University named Phelps as the next president of the university to replace W. Jack Magruder effective July 1, 2012. An announcement sent to the university stated, in part, "Dr. Phelps, a 1984 graduate of ATSU’s Kirksville College of Osteopathic Medicine, became Provost of the University’s Arizona campus in 1998, where he led the team that developed the campus and its three academic units: the Arizona School of Health Sciences, the Arizona School of Dentistry & Oral Health, and the School of Osteopathic Medicine in Arizona. In 2010, Dr. Phelps became the University’s first Executive Vice President for Strategic Initiatives; he has been working with Dr. Magruder and key ATSU leaders to develop the Missouri School of Dentistry & Oral Health, as well as other programs."

In addition to his ATSU responsibilities, Phelps serves on the American Osteopathic Academy of Sports Medicine, the Society of NBA (National Basketball Association) Team Physicians, the Greater Phoenix Economic Council, and the Greater Phoenix Leadership Council. He was the primary care team physician of the NBA Phoenix Suns and the WNBA Phoenix Mercury, the company physician of the Ballet Arizona and team physician of several Phoenix-area colleges. He also serves on the board of directors of the Valley of the Sun YMCA and the Board of Managers of the Ross Farnsworth-East Valley YMCA.

Dr. Phelps was named the National Basketball Athletic Trainers Association (NBATA) Physician of the Year for 2010-2011. The award is an annual honor voted on by the members of the NBATA, designed to recognize a team physician for exceptional service and care for his/her respective team and visiting NBA teams, and also a commitment to the serve in the community and to NBATA charities.
