= Chattanooga Medical College =

Private college in Chattanooga, Tennessee, US

- Type: Private medical
- Active: 1889–1910
- Parent institution: U.S. Grant University
- Location: Chattanooga, Tennessee, United States

Chattanooga Medical College was an American private medical college located in Chattanooga, Tennessee. It was established in 1889 and closed in 1910. The medical college was affiliated with U.S. Grant University.

== History ==
Chattanooga Medical College was a private medical school that opened in September 1889 in Chattanooga, Tennessee. It had twenty students. Its faculty were local physicians and a local pharmacist. It was overseen by dean E. A. Cobleigh under the loose administration of U.S. Grant University. Its first class graduated in January 1890.

The college helped form the Southern Medical College Association in 1892. Its students came from across the United States and Canada. J. R. Rathmell took over the leadership of the college as its dean in 1905 after Cobleigh died.

Administrative changes at U.S. Grant University, which had been renamed the University of Chattanooga, gave the university more control over the medical school. The university decided to close Chattanooga Medical College in 1910 to focus its resources on the accreditation of undergraduate programs. A long-term faculty member noted that it was no longer practical or feasible for the small medical college to keep up with the rising standards of medical education. Specifically, the Carnegie Foundation Fund Association's standards for equipment and an endowment of "class A" medical schools were out of reach for the Chattanooga Medical College, which lacked an endowment.

Before it closed, Chattanooga Medical College had more than 700 graduates.

== Campus ==
Chattanooga Medical College opened in the former Howard School building on Ninth Street in Chattanooga, Tennessee. It then moved to a leased building at the corner of East Ninth Street and Georgia Avenue for six years. It moved to the west end of Old Main on the campus of U.S. Grant University in 1896. A new building was constructed near the corner of Vine and Baldwin Streets and was dedicated in 1903.

== Academics ==
Chattanooga Medical College taught anatomy and medicine, initially awarding an M.D. degree after two years of coursework. After the formation of the Southern Medical College Association in 1892, the college changed its requirements to three years of coursework for an M.D., and encouraged four years of study. The college had a relationship with the Baroness Erlanger Hospital and also had a public clinic.

== Student activities ==
Chattanooga Medical College had a chapter of Phi Chi medical fraternity from 1906 to 1910.

== See also ==
- List of defunct medical schools in the United States
