= S. S. Still =

American osteopath (1851–1931)

Summerfield Saunders Still
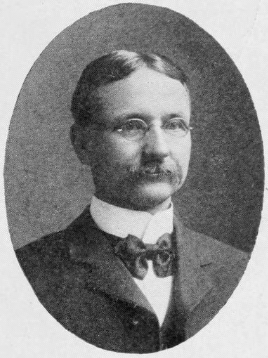
- Born: December 7, 1851; Macon County, Missouri
- Died: November 20, 1931 (aged 79); Kirksville, Missouri
- Education: A.T. Still University
- Occupation: Osteopath
- Known for: Founder of Des Moines University
- Spouse: Ella Daugherty (m. 1877)

Summerfield Saunders Still (1851–1931), nephew of Andrew Taylor Still, was an osteopath and founder of a school of osteopathy.

== Early life ==
Still was born in Macon County, Missouri, the son of James Still, a medical doctor trained in Chicago, Illinois, and Rahab Saunders Still. The Still family moved to Kansas, where S. S. Still was educated in Blue Mound, Eudora, and at Baker University at Baldwin.

== Education ==
At the age of 15, Summerfield Still enrolled at Baker University, a Methodist college in Baldwin, Kansas where he was studying from 1876 to 1878. After graduating, he taught school in Douglas County, Kansas. Upon marrying, Still and his wife moved to Maryville, Missouri and then on to Kirksville in 1893.

In 1893, he enrolled at the American School of Osteopathy (now the A.T. Still University) in Kirksville, which was founded by his uncle, Andrew Taylor Still, the developer of osteopathic medicine in the United States and the president of the school. He and his wife both studied osteopathy at the American School of Osteopathy and in 1895, S. S. Still graduated with a Diploma of Osteopathy, and then stayed at the school in Kirksville to teach. Still was considered an expert in anatomy. Still studied law at Drake University, receiving degrees in 1903 and 1904.

== Founding a medical school ==
In 1898, after Iowa legalized the practice of osteopathy, Still and his wife, Ella Daugherty Still, established an osteopathic medical school in Des Moines, the Dr. S. S. Still College of Osteopathy, the second such osteopathic school in the United States. Throughout its history, the school has been renamed several times and was renamed the Des Moines College of Osteopathy and Surgery in 1945, and in 1958 was renamed again to the Des Moines College of Osteopathic Medicine and Surgery. The College of Osteopathic Medicine and Surgery went on to become part of the University of Osteopathic Medicine and Health Sciences in 1981, and is now known as the Des Moines University College of Osteopathic Medicine. While his being a president of the college, Still entered Drake University's law school, graduating in 1903 and although he never practiced law he took an active part in politics.

== Later career ==
In 1905, Still sold his interests in the school and devoted himself to private practice until 1913. He then became an anatomy professor at the Kirksville school and, after his son's accidental gunshot death in 1922, succeeded him as president of the facility, serving two years. He had a wide range of interests in different branches of science the likes of astronomy, mathematics, archaeology and anthropology. From 1924 on, Still contributed a column to the Kirksville Graphic newspaper, with his last column published the day of his death. He was an honorary member of the Woman's Christian Temperance Union and a member of the Anti-Saloon League. He also contributed as an editor in the American Journal of Physiologic Therapeutics. Dr. Still died in Kirksville on November 20, 1931, and his body was brought back to Des Moines the following day for burial at Woodland Cemetery.

== Personal life ==
On October 3, 1877, Summerfield married Ella Daugherty in Lawrence, Kansas. They raised two children: George and Delia.

== See also ==
- Andrew Taylor Still—uncle of S. S. Still. Founder of osteopathy and of A. T. Still University, the first osteopathic school
