= Agnes Kalaniho'okaha Cope =

Hawaiian cultural expert

- Born: November 7, 1924; Honolulu
- Died: November 16, 2015; Kapolei
- Education: Farrington High School, University of Hawaiʻi

Agnes Kalanihoʻokaha Cope (November 7, 1924 – November 16, 2015) was an expert in traditional Hawaiian culture. A spiritual healer, Cope helped establish the Waianae Coast Comprehensive Health Center after recognizing barriers Native Hawaiians faced in receiving healthcare. She was also a hula master and founded the Waianae Coast Culture and Arts Society to preserve traditional Hawaiian knowledge and practice. She also went by Aunty Aggie Cope.

== Early life and education ==
Agnes Kalaniho‘okaha Mengler was born on November 7, 1924, in Honolulu. Her parents were Henry T. Mengler, a German man, and Sarah Kalaniho’okaha Hakuole Mengler, a native Hawaiian from Maui. Cope learned to speak Hawaiian from her mother and studied hula under kumu (teacher) Lokalia Montgomery. She grew up in Honolulu and attended Farrington High School.

Cope graduated from Honolulu Business College and the University of Hawaiʻi at Mānoa, where she studied education. She began her career teaching English at Waianae High School, and later taught at Waianae and Nanaikapono elementary schools.

== Work preserving Hawaiian culture ==
Cope was a kumu hula, a master teacher in the art of hula, as well as a teacher of the Hawaiian language. She encouraged the practice and teaching of traditional Hawaiian arts and culture throughout her life.

In 1967 she founded the Waianae Coast Culture and Arts Society, seeking to practice and preserve Hawaiian culture. She was the Society's Executive Director for many years, encouraging the community to learn from cultural practitioners and artists. As director of the organization, Cope was instrumental in the research and publication of the 1986 book Ka Poe Kahiko o Waianae: Oral Histories of the Waianae Coast of Hawaii, documenting the rich history of Hawaii from the perspectives of kupuna.

== Efforts in health care ==
Cope was a practitioner of lā'au kāhea, Hawaiian spiritual healing.

After recognizing some Hawaiians in Waianae were not able to afford hospital treatment, Cope worked with other residents to help found the Waianae Coast Comprehensive Health Center. The center and its two satellite clinics practice Western medicine, but the treatment regime is complemented with traditional Hawaiian healthcare practices. A group of traditional healers work out of the Dr. Agnes Kalaniho‘okaha Cope Traditional Hawaiian Healing Center, which was built in 2009. Cope led the center's Kūpuna Council, a group of Native Hawaiian master healers who advise on cultural and traditional services.

For ten years she served on the board of Ke Ola Mamo, a health care system in O‘ahu for the Native Hawaiian community. Core was an original member of the original Kupuna Council of Healers, established in 1988, bringing her perspective as a traditional Hawaiian healer.

== Death, honors, and legacy ==
Cope died November 16, 2015, in Kapolei.

In 1987 Cope was named one of the Living Treasures of Hawaiʻi by the Honpa Hongwanji Mission of Hawaii. In 2000 she received the Ka‘ōnohi Award in honor of her significant contributions to improving the health and well-being of Hawaiians. She was awarded an honorary Doctor of Humane Letters from the University of Hawaiʻi at Mānoa in 2009. Governor Neil Abercrombie proclaimed April 8, 2011, as Agnes Kalaniho‘okaha Cope Day in Hawaii.

The Kamehameha Schools system announced plans in 2018 to build a community learning center in Nānākuli to be named after Cope.
