= Suzanne Steinbaum =

American cardiologist

- Born: Cherry Hill, New Jersey
- Education: Tufts University, Kirksville College of Osteopathic Medicine (DO)
- Occupations: Cardiology, women's health, author
- Medical career
- Sub-specialties: Cardiovascular disease

Suzanne Steinbaum is a cardiologist, a director of the Women's Heart Health at the Heart and Vascular Institute, at Lenox Hill Hospital, and an author. She is a national spokesperson for the Go Red for Women initiative of the American Heart Association, and the prior chairperson of Go Red in New York City (2012–15). She was a board director of the American Heart Association in New York City in 2014. She hosts a weekly news show, Focus on Health, broadcast on WLNY-TV.

Steinbaum has authored material on various topics of cardiac health and nutrition.

== Early life and education ==
Steinbaum was born in Cherry Hill, New Jersey, to Eleanor and Frederick Steinbaum. Prior to her 10th birthday, the family moved to Livingston, New Jersey. She graduated from Livingston High School in 1986.

Steinbuam graduated from Tufts University with a B.A., and then completed medical school at Kirksville College of Osteopathic Medicine. She had further training at Beth Israel Medical Center in internal medicine and cardiology. She subsequently completed fellowships in both preventive cardiology and non-invasive cardiology, with a subspecialty focus in preventive heart disease in women. She is a fellow of the American College of Cardiology.

== Career ==
Upon completion of her training, Steinbaum joined Lenox Hill Hospital, in 2006, to head the Women and Heart Disease Program. She also authored a book, Dr. Suzanne Steinbaum's Heart Book: Every Woman's Guide to a Heart-Healthy Life.

Steinbaum has appeared, as a guest, on health segments on ABC News and Good Morning America, NBC, CNN and CBS News. She has also appeared on segments of The Early Show, The Doctors, Good Morning America, Inside Edition, and The Dr. Oz Show. Some of her work has been cited in Self, Glamour, More, Fitness, Forbes, The Wall Street Journal and Family Circle.

Stienbaum served as medical director for the Young Professionals division of the American Heart Association from 2000 to 2012.

She is an active national spokesperson for the Go Red for Women campaign of the American Heart Association.

Steinbaum recommends Transcendental Meditation to her patients.

== Awards and honors ==
- 2010: Young Hearts Award (AHA) – for achievement in Cardiovascular Science and medicine.
- 2012: Women of Heart award.
- Castle and Connolly's Top Doctors – 2013 and 2014.
- Named Super Doctor by the New York Times in 2013 and 2014, and New York Magazine’s selection of Top Doctors in 2013 and 2014.

== Author ==
- "The Metabolic Syndrome: An Emerging Health Epidemic in Women" (article)
- "Dr. Suzanne Steinbaum's Heart Book: Every Woman's Guide to a Heart-Healthy Life," published by the Penguin Group. (book)
- "Lowering Your Blood Pressure Naturally: Drop Pounds and Slash Your Blood Pressure in 6 Weeks Without Drugs." (book co-author).
