= A.T. Still University =

Medical school in Kirksville, Missouri, US

- Former names: American School of Osteopathy (1892–1922) A.T. Still College of Osteopathy and Surgery (1922–1924); Kirksville Osteopathy College (1924–1926); Kirksville College of Osteopathy and Surgery (1926–1971) Kirksville College of Osteopathic Medicine (1972–2003)
- Type: Private medical school
- Established: 1892; 134 years ago
- Accreditation: Higher Learning Commission
- Endowment: US $53.6 million (2006)
- President: Craig M. Phelps, DO
- Faculty: 234 full time 511 part time
- Students: 3,717
- Location: Kirksville, MO, USA; 40°11′37″N 92°34′46″W
- Campus: Kirksville, MO Mesa, AZ San Luis Obispo, CA
- Colors: Blue; Aqua
- Website: atsu.edu

A.T. Still University (ATSU) is a private medical school located in Kirksville, Missouri, with a second campus in Arizona and third campus in San Luis Obispo, California. It was founded in 1892 by Andrew Taylor Still and was the world's first osteopathic medical school. It is accredited by the Higher Learning Commission. ATSU includes three campuses on 200 acres with seven schools and colleges.

== History ==
=== Missouri ===
In 1892 in Kirksville, Missouri, Dr. Andrew Taylor Still founded the first osteopathic medical school in the world. Originally known as the American School of Osteopathy (ASO), the inaugural class of 21 students graduated in 1894. In 1892 Still hired William Smith, a formally trained Scottish physician, to serve as the first anatomy professor of the school. Several other early osteopathic schools eventually merged with Still's school including the Atlantic School of Osteopathy (1898–1905), which had been based in Wilkes Barre, Pennsylvania and then Buffalo, New York.

In 1908, the school established a nursing program. In 1922, the school was renamed the "A.T. Still College of Osteopathy and Surgery." Two years later, in 1924, ASO merged with another osteopathic medical school (Andrew Taylor Still College of Osteopathy and Surgery), becoming the Kirksville Osteopathic College. In 1925, the school was renamed the Kirksville College of Osteopathy and Surgery. In 1949, the first rural clinic was established in Gibbs, Missouri. As of 1960, the rural clinics program operated 10 clinics and served 43,000 patients. In 1960, the Rockefeller family donated resources to build the Timken-Burnett Research building. In 1971, the school was again renamed to the "Kirksville College of Osteopathic Medicine." In 1999, the College of Graduate Health Sciences opened (ATSU-CGHS). In 2001, the schools were organized under the new name AT Still University. In 2013, a dental school opened at the Kirksville campus (ATSU-MOSDOH).

=== Arizona ===
In 1995, the university established the Arizona School of Health Sciences. In 2000, a second ATSU campus opened in Mesa, which became the primary Arizona campus for ATSU. In 2003, the Arizona School of Dentistry and Oral Health opened and began accepting students. In 2006, the School of Osteopathic Medicine in Arizona (ATSU-SOMA) opened and began accepting students the following year. In 2014, the Center of Advanced Oral Health opened at the Mesa campus. It provides dentistry for those with advanced oral health needs, and developed in response to the complex needs of patients in underserved communities.

=== California ===
In September 2021, the university initiated the Central Coast Physician Assistant program in Santa Maria, California, matriculating 90 students in the inaugural class. In January 2022, the Higher Learning Commission approved ATSU's third campus, the College for Health Communities, in Santa Maria, California.

== Campus and locations ==
ATSU operates three campuses (Kirksville, MO, Mesa, AZ, and Santa Maria, CA) on more than 200 acres with seven schools, offering degree programs in a wide spectrum of health sciences.

=== Missouri campus ===
ATSU's main campus is located on 150 acres in Kirksville, Missouri. Kirksville's population is more than 17,000 and is approximately 180 miles to Kansas City and 214 miles to St. Louis. The campus houses the Kirksville College of Osteopathic Medicine, and includes a human patient simulation lab, study rooms for standardized patient encounters, classrooms, and labs. It also houses the Gutensohn Clinic, the Museum of Osteopathic Medicine, the A.T. Still Memorial Library, the Northeast Missouri Area Health Education Center, and the A.T. Still Research Institute.

The university runs the Museum of Osteopathic Medicine at its Kirksville campus. The museum was founded in 1934 and holds more than 80,000 artifacts, documents, and books relating to osteopathic medicine.

=== Arizona campus ===
A.T. Still University School of Osteopathic Medicine in Arizona, located in the city of Mesa, was established in the 1990s and is located on a 59-acre campus approximately 25 miles from Phoenix. The School of Osteopathic Medicine in Arizona (ATSU-SOMA) is housed at the Mesa campus, which includes a 100,000-square-foot (9,300 m2) building on the 22-acre (8.9 ha) campus of ATSU in Mesa, Ariz. The campus is the anchor of the Arizona Health and Technology Park, a 132-acre (53.4 ha) education, healthcare, and technology triangle owned by ATSU and Vanguard Health Systems. Long terms for the new park include hospitals, long-term care facilities, professional offices, and product development research facilities.

=== California campus ===
The university's San Luis Obispo campus is a 65,000 square feet (6,000 m^{2}) facility with a 400 space parking structure. The campus primarily supports the university's Physician Assistant program as part of ATSU's College for Healthy Communities.

The campus was previously the headquarters for Mindbody, Inc. A.T. Still University occupied the building in October 2026, after having operated out of a smaller facility in nearby Santa Maria, California.

== Patient care ==
A.T. Still University provides patient care in several locations in Missouri and Arizona. At the Mesa campus, ATSU provides medical, dental, balance and hearing services. The university provides primary care services in Kirksville and dental services in St. Louis, Missouri.

== Academics ==
College	Founded	Accreditation
ATSU	1892	Higher Learning Commission
Health Sciences	1995	American Speech-Language-Hearing Association (ASHA); American Physical Therapy Association; Accreditation Review Commission on Education for the PA; Accreditation Council for Occupational Therapy Education; Commission on Accreditation of Athletic Training Education
Dental Medicine	2003	American Dental Association
Osteopathic Medicine	1892	American Osteopathic Association COCA

ATSU currently offers 30 graduate and post-professional programs among its schools and colleges. All programs at ATSU are post-baccalaureate and focused on health sciences. ATSU-KCOM is accredited by the Higher Learning Commission, a commission of the North Central Association of Colleges and Schools (NCA). Individual programs also hold accreditation by their respective national accrediting bodies.

Doctoral degrees include the Doctor of Audiology, Doctor of Dental Medicine, Doctor of Occupational Therapy, Doctor of Physical Therapy, and Doctor of Osteopathic Medicine. Master of Science programs are offered in Athletic Training, Biomedical Sciences, Orthodontics, Occupational Therapy, and Physician Assistant Studies. Several certificate programs are offered in various subjects, including athletic sciences, global health, education and leadership. Several degree programs are offered online.

=== Community health centers and medical education ===
SOMA educates osteopathic medicine students under a relatively new medical educational model, which links osteopathic training to community health centers in the U.S. A partnership exists between ATSU and the National Association of Community Health Centers. The ATSU-ASDOH implemented a model integrating state of the art training with patient care needs in community health centers (CHCs). ATSU-SOMA works in partnership with eleven sites to integrate medical education with preparation for the most complex healthcare careers. A hometown program exists to offer an opportunity for medical students previously connected to CHCs to gain admission.

== Research ==
Through the AT Still Research Institute, the university conducts research in several areas. In cooperation with the National Center for Community Health Research, ATSU conducts research on social determinants in health, particularly in regions served by community health centers. ATSU also conducts research on assessing trainees skills in the subject of osteopathic manipulative medicine. The Center for Oral Health Research conducts research in the field of dentistry. Research is funded in part by the National Institute for Health.

== Student life ==
ATSU has an average annual enrollment of more than 3,100 students from 35 countries. In the 2018–19 academic year, a total of 3,717 students were in attendance at ATSU, from 35 countries. In that academic year, 77% of students were full time, while 23% were enrolled on a part-time basis. 57% of students were female and 43% were male. 56% were White, 14% Asian, 9% Hispanic/Latino, 7% black or African-American, 1% Native American, 1% Native Hawaiian, 5% two or more races, and the remaining students were of unknown ethnicity (6%).

Students at ATSU participate in 143 clubs and extracurricular organizations on campus. Organizations include an active student government association and the professional fraternities Sigma Sigma Phi and Delta Sigma Delta. The Still-Well Student Wellness Program is designed to encourage students' health and wellness. Additional clubs and organizations on campus include:

- American Association of Public Health Dentistry
- American College of Osteopathic Family Physicians
- American Medical Student Association
- American Medical Women's Association
- American Student Dental Association
- DOCARE
- Student Osteopathic Medical Association

== Gallery ==
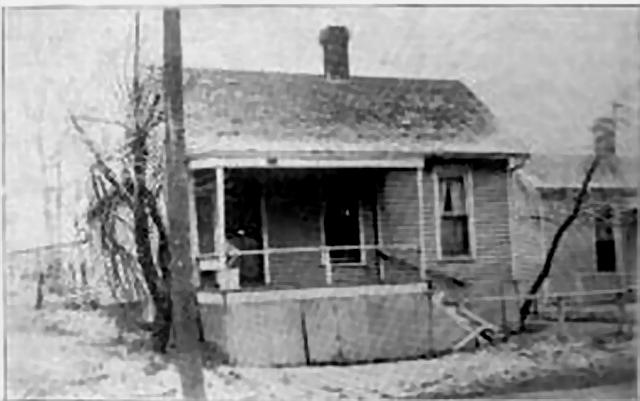
The first building of the American School of Osteopathy in Kirksville, Missouri. Dr. A.T. Still taught the first classes here in 1892.

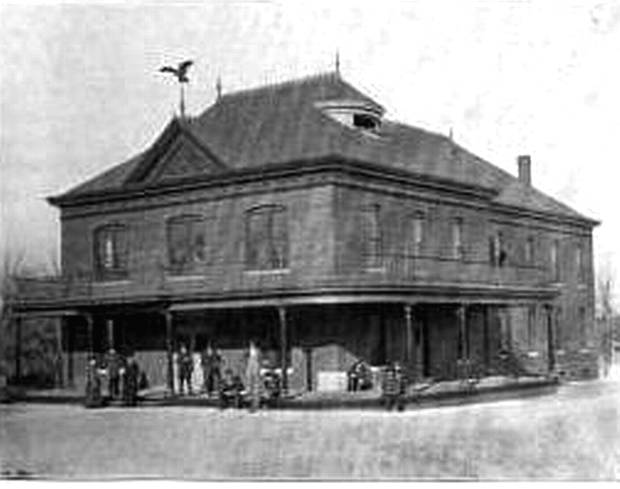
The second A.S.O. building in Kirksville. Rapid growth in school enrollment soon outgrew the first building.

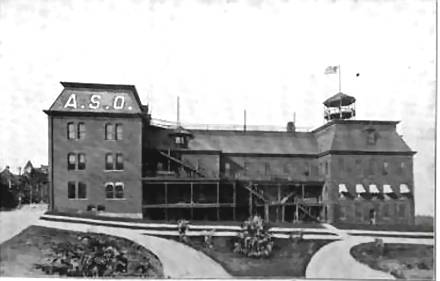
A third building, with more classrooms and surgical areas, was constructed in 1906.

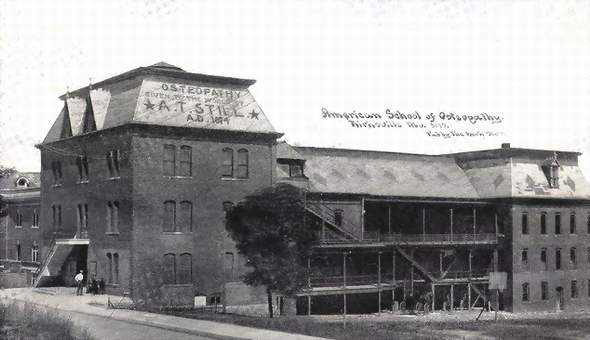
A slightly different angle and closer view of the third A.S.O. building.

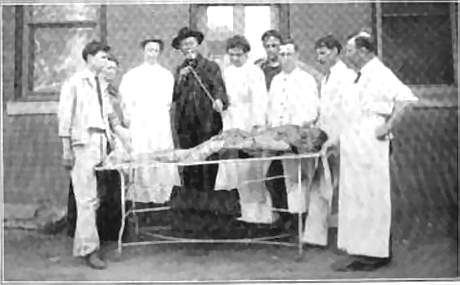
Dr. A.T. Still and students examine a cadaver as part of a human anatomy class.

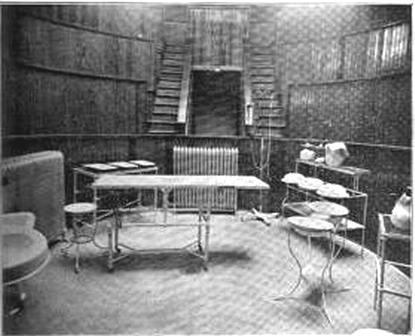
Surgical pit in the third A.S.O. building. Students would stand on platforms on surrounding walls to observe surgeries.

== People ==
ATSU employs 234 full time faculty and 511 part time faculty. Some notable alumni, faculty and staff include:

- Capt. Sean Barbabella, DO, White House Physician (2025-)
- Jenette H. Bolles, DO first woman to have a career as an osteopath and first woman faculty member at ASO
- Jane Craven, doctor, prize-winning tennis player, World War I ambulance driver and medic, nun.
- Cecil Ferguson, DO professional baseball player
- Mary Maxwell Hathorn DO (1884–1935), osteopath from Mississippi, practiced in Texas, Louisiana, and New York
- Masajiro Miyazaki, DO Japanese Canadian physician for Japanese Canadian internment camp and coroner for Lillooet, British Columbia
- Craig Phelps, DO, previous provost and current president of A.T. Still University, and primary care team physician of the NBA Phoenix Suns
- Frederick Smith, DO, a Republican member of the U.S. House of Representatives for Ohio
- Suzanne Steinbaum DO, cardiologist, author, and national spokesperson for the American Heart Association
- S. S. Still, DO founder of Des Moines University and nephew of Andrew Taylor Still
- William Sutherland, DO
- Sherri Tenpenny DO, noted anti-vaccine activist and 5G conspiracy theorist
- Kelli Ward, MPH and Arizona politician and chair of the Arizona Republican Party
- Stephen Ward, DO, an English osteopath and artist

== See also ==
- List of dental schools in the United States
- List of medical schools in the United States
- Osteopathic medicine in the United States
