= American Association of Public Health Dentistry =

The American Association of Public Health Dentistry (AAPHD), founded in 1937, focuses upon addressing the public health challenges to oral health at the population level. Its open membership for everyone who seeks improvement in oral health of the general public. supports developing and supporting effective programs of oral health promotion and disease prevention. It is headquartered in Springfield, Illinois.

== Mission ==
Public health dentistry is defined as by TheFreeDictionary.com as "that specialty of dentistry concerned with the prevention and control of dental diseases and promotion of oral health through organized community efforts."

== Organization ==
The American Association of Public Health Dentistry was founded in 1937. AAPHD publishes a newsletter for AAPHD members and a journal, the Journal of Public Health Dentistry. It offers online continuing education courses for public health dentists in oral health literacy, dental public health policy and advocacy, and professional dental ethics.

Since October 2014, Julie Frantsve-Hawley, PhD, has been the executive director of AAPHD. She had been with American Dental Association before and had edited journals in evidence-based dentistry.

Each year it plans a National Oral Health Conference® (NOHC) in the United States, which next will be held from April 16–18, 2018 in Louisville, Kentucky.

AAPHD student chapters are found in major US dental schools.

Similar national dental student groups (with chapters in dental schools) include:

- Alpha Omega (AO) - Alpha Omega International, an international Jewish dental fraternity founded in Baltimore, Maryland in 1907 by a group of dental students originally to fight discrimination in dental schools. It now claims about 5000 members in 105 chapters worldwide.
- American Association of Women Dentists (AAWD)
- American Student Dental Association (ASDA)
- Asian Dental Student Organization (ADSO)
- Hispanic Student Dental Association (HSDA)
- Omicron Kappa Upsilon - the National Dental Honors Society
- Student National Dental Association (SNDA)
