= Atlantic School of Osteopathy =

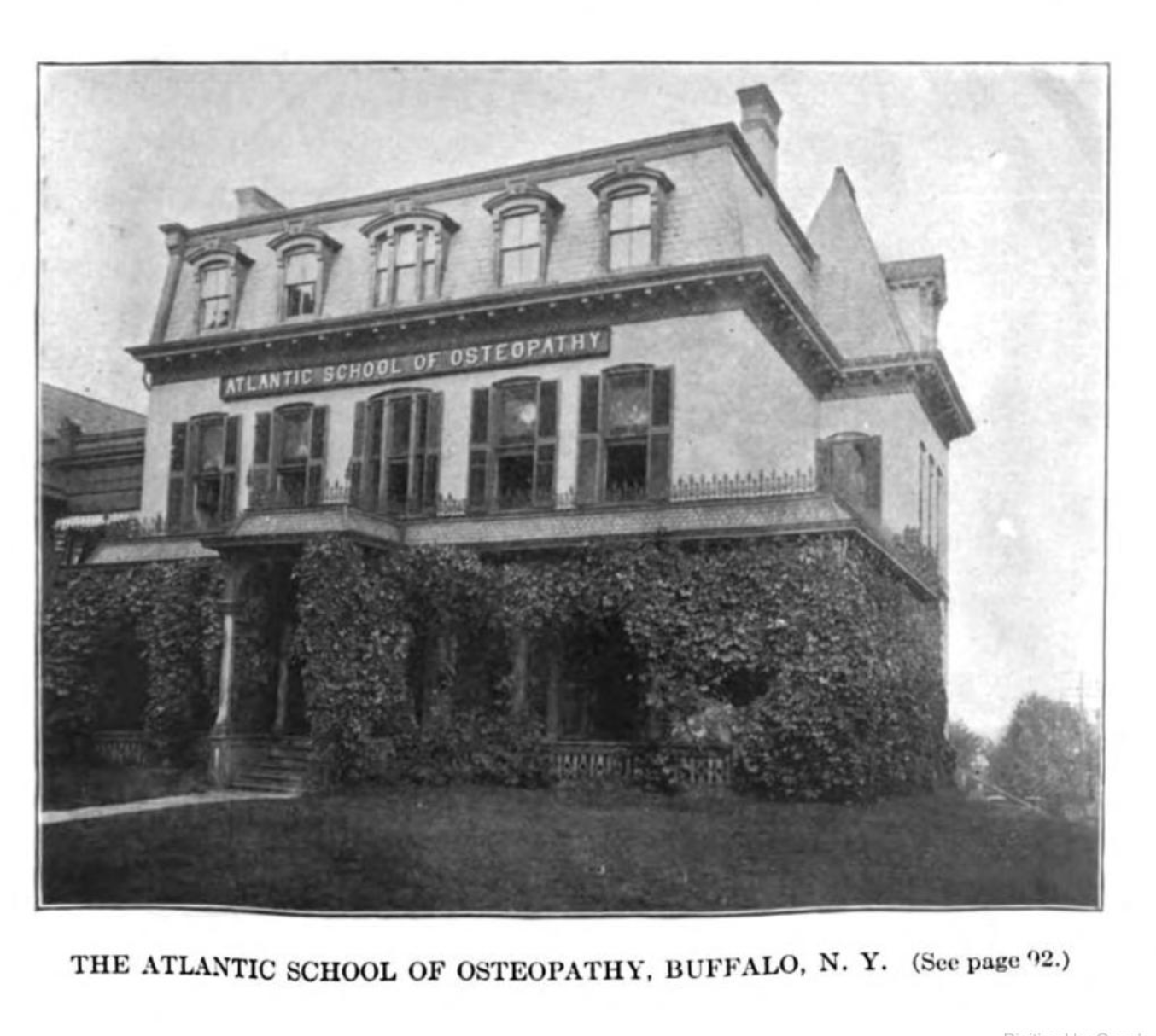
Atlantic School of Osteopathy in Buffalo New York

Atlantic School of Osteopathy was a school of osteopathy founded in Wilkes-Barre, Pennsylvania in 1898. It moved to Buffalo, New York in 1904 and in 1905 merged into the American School of Osteopathy in Kirksville, Missouri, which is now known as A.T. Still University.

== History ==
In 1898, Dr. Schuyler C. Mathews and Dr. Virgil A. Hook recruited several influential philanthropists, formed an organization, and then received a charter for the Atlantic School of Osteopathy on February 21, 1899. The first presidents of the school were "Dr. V. A. Hook, Mr. J. C. Bell, and Dr. [John] W. Banning" and the first term began in February 1899. Dr. William Smith, a Scottish physician, briefly served as president in 1900.

The school was originally located in the Simon Long Building in Wilkes-Barre until the school purchased and remodeled the Central Methodist Episcopal Church in that same city. In 1904, the school moved to Buffalo, New York. In 1905, the Buffalo Municipal Court issued a warrant for Banning's arrest due to his issuing diplomas without approval from the state board of regents.

By 1906, the Atlantic School of Osteopathy merged with the American School of Osteopathy.

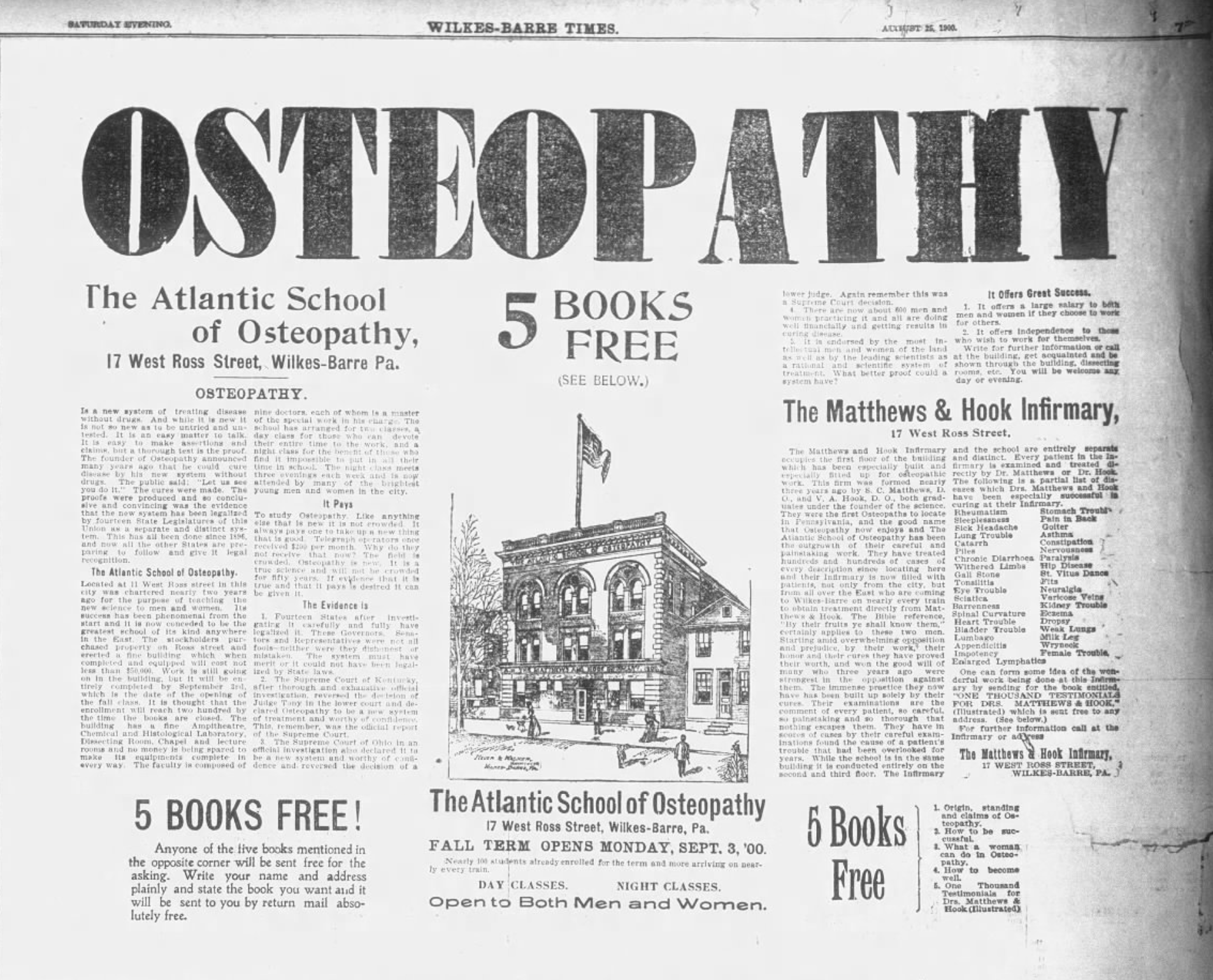
Advertisement for the Atlantic School of Osteopathy in Wilkes-Barre Pennsylvania (1900) with Matthews & Hook Infirmary shown at bottom of building with Atlantic School of Osteopathy labeled at the top

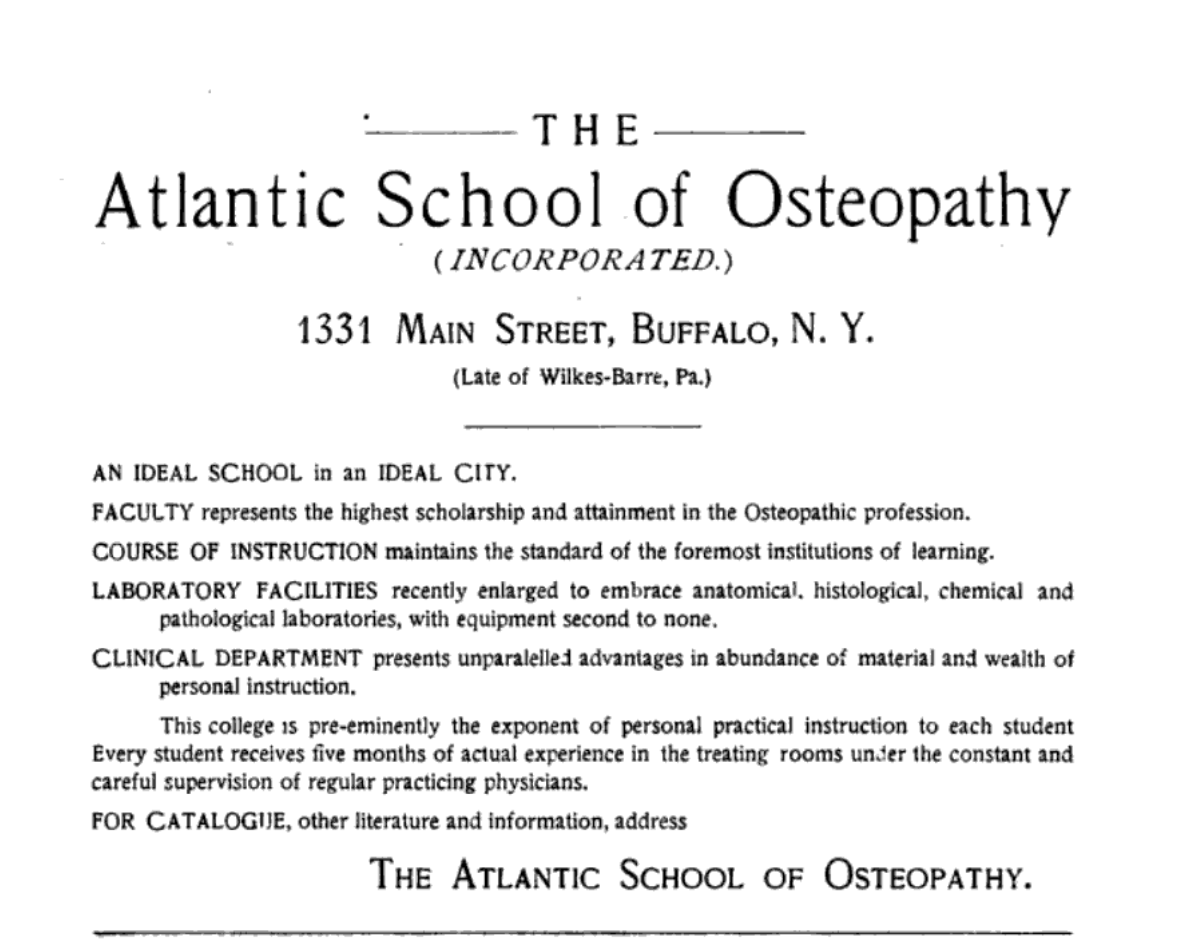
Advertisement for the Atlantic School of Osteopathy from The Journal of the American Osteopathic Association, Volume 4 (1905)
