= Andrew Taylor Still =

American physician, politician, and founder of osteopathy (1828–1917)

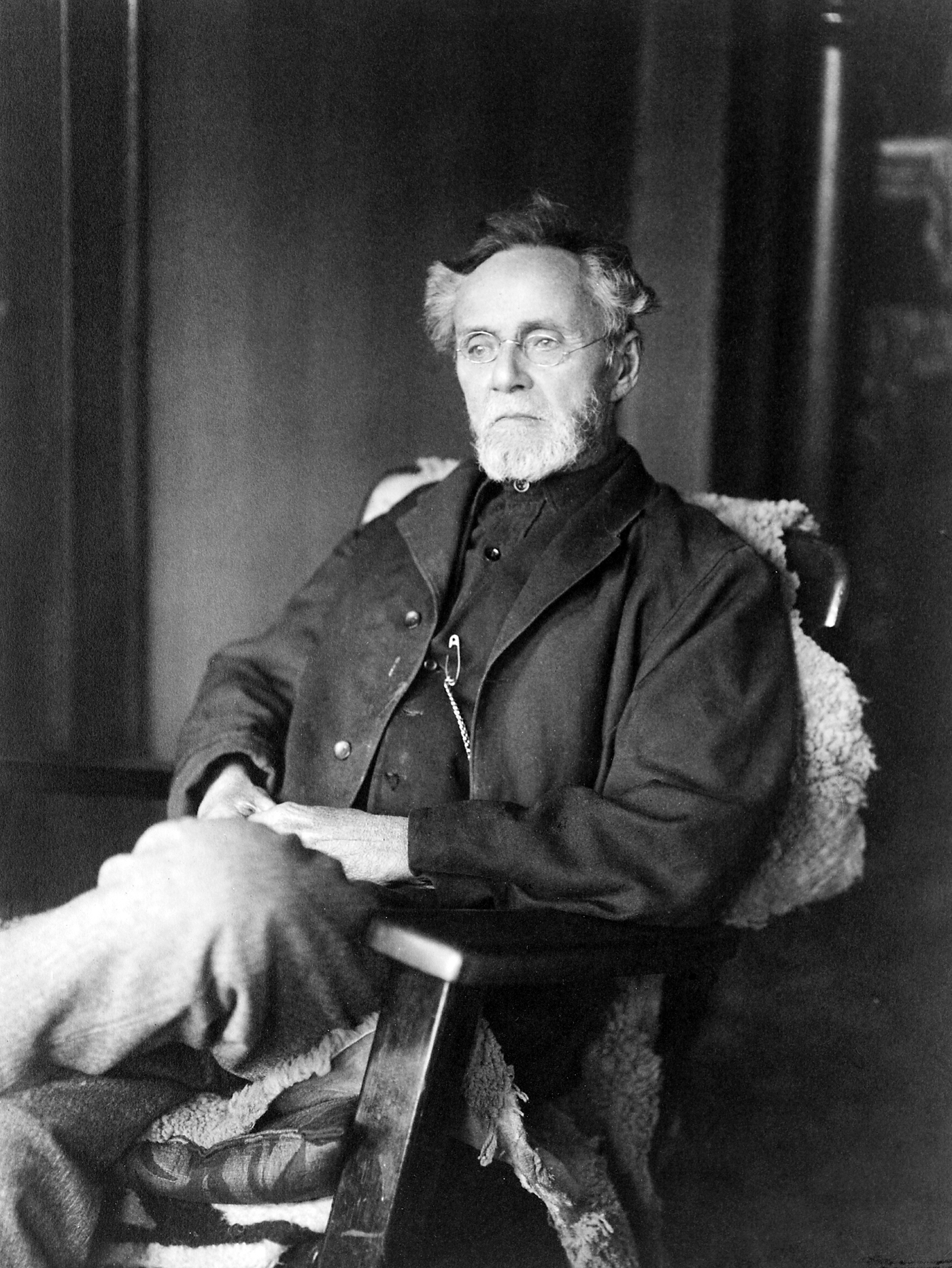
- Andrew Taylor Still in 1914
- Born: August 6, 1828; Lee County, Virginia, U.S.
- Died: December 12, 1917 (aged 89); Kirksville, Missouri, U.S.
- Other name: Still
- Education: College of Physicians and Surgeons, Kansas City, MO (MD)
- Father: Abraham Still
- Scientific career
- Fields: Medicine; Osteopathy; Osteopathic medicine
- Workplaces: Baker University; A.T. Still University

Signature
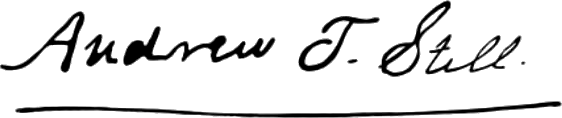

Andrew Taylor Still (August 6, 1828 – December 12, 1917) was the founder of osteopathic medicine. He was also a physician and surgeon, author, inventor and Kansas territorial and state legislator. He was one of the founders of Baker University, the oldest four-year college in the state of Kansas, and was the founder of the American School of Osteopathy (now A.T. Still University), the world's first osteopathic medical school, in Kirksville, Missouri.

== Early life and interests ==
Still was the son of a Methodist minister and physician. At an early age, Still decided to follow in his father's footsteps as a physician. After studying medicine and serving an apprenticeship under his father, he entered the Civil War. He served as a hospital steward assigned to Company F of the Cass County Home Guard of the Missouri Cavalry (Union), but later stated in his autobiography that he served as a "de facto surgeon."

At the time, the hospital stewards of the Army had many responsibilities, including maintaining hospital stores, furniture, and supplies for the sick. Since pharmacists were not provided for the hospitals, the hospital stewards also filled prescriptions, and when the medical officers were not present, they took care of the patients. Hospital Stewards were sometimes rewarded with promotions to surgeon or assistant surgeon.

In his autobiography, Still says he served in the Civil War in Company F of the 9th Kansas Cavalry. His military service record for the Missouri regiment says that his company was transferred to the 9th Kansas Infantry, not cavalry, but that the transfer was made "without proper authority." The judge advocate general then orders that these men not be given credit for this unauthorized service.

After the Civil War and following the death of his wife, three of his children, and an adopted child from spinal meningitis in 1864, Still concluded that the orthodox medical practices of his day were frequently ineffective and sometimes harmful. The use of Calomel, also known as mercury chloride, was one such medical practice Still took particular issue with. At the time, there were no standardized dosages for the drug so practitioners of heroic medicine would often deliver dosages that were too large, resulting in mercury poisoning. Still devoted the next thirty years of his life to studying the human body and finding alternative ways to treat disease; his methods involved meticulous anatomical dissection to discover its structure and, therefore, function. This involved exhuming corpses which, while controversial, was a widespread practice among many medical schools in the United States and abroad during that time. During this period, he completed a short course in medicine at the new College of Physicians and Surgeons in Kansas City, Missouri, in 1870.

Still adopted the ideas of spiritualism sometime around 1867, and it "held a prominent and lasting place in his thinking."

== Kansas territorial and state legislator ==
Still was active in the abolition movement and a friend and ally of the Free State leaders John Brown and James H. Lane. He became deeply embroiled in the fight over whether Kansas would be admitted to the Union as a slave state or a free state. The Kansas–Nebraska Act of 1854 provided that the settlers in those two territories would decide the question for themselves. Civil war raged in Kansas as both sides tried to gain control of the territorial government. In October 1857, Still was elected to represent Douglas and Johnson counties in the Kansas territorial legislature. Still and his brothers took up arms in the cause and participated in the Bleeding Kansas battles (between the pro and anti-slavery citizens). By August 1858, a free-state constitution had been passed; Kansas was admitted to the Union as a free state on January 29, 1861.

== Inventor and patents ==
Still was fascinated by machines, and whenever faced with a mechanical problem, his answer was always to devise a better approach. In the 1870s, he patented an improved butter churn. He made improvements to a mowing machine designed to harvest wheat and hay, but before a patent could be submitted, his idea was stolen by a visiting sales representative from the Wood Mowing Machine Co. In 1910, he patented a smokeless furnace burner but had "some difficulty producing a full-sized working model. Heartbroken after his wife, Mary Elvira's, death in May 1910, he did not have the will to pursue the matter further, and the invention was never successfully marketed."

== Baker University ==
Still and his family were among the founders of Baker University in Baldwin City in 1858, the first four-year university in the state of Kansas. Still was involved in selecting the location for the site of Baker University's first building. Along with his brother, Still donated 640 acres of land for the university campus. While maintaining his medical practice, where he treated patients afflicted with small-pox and cholera, Still spent five years building the facilities.

== Osteopathy ==
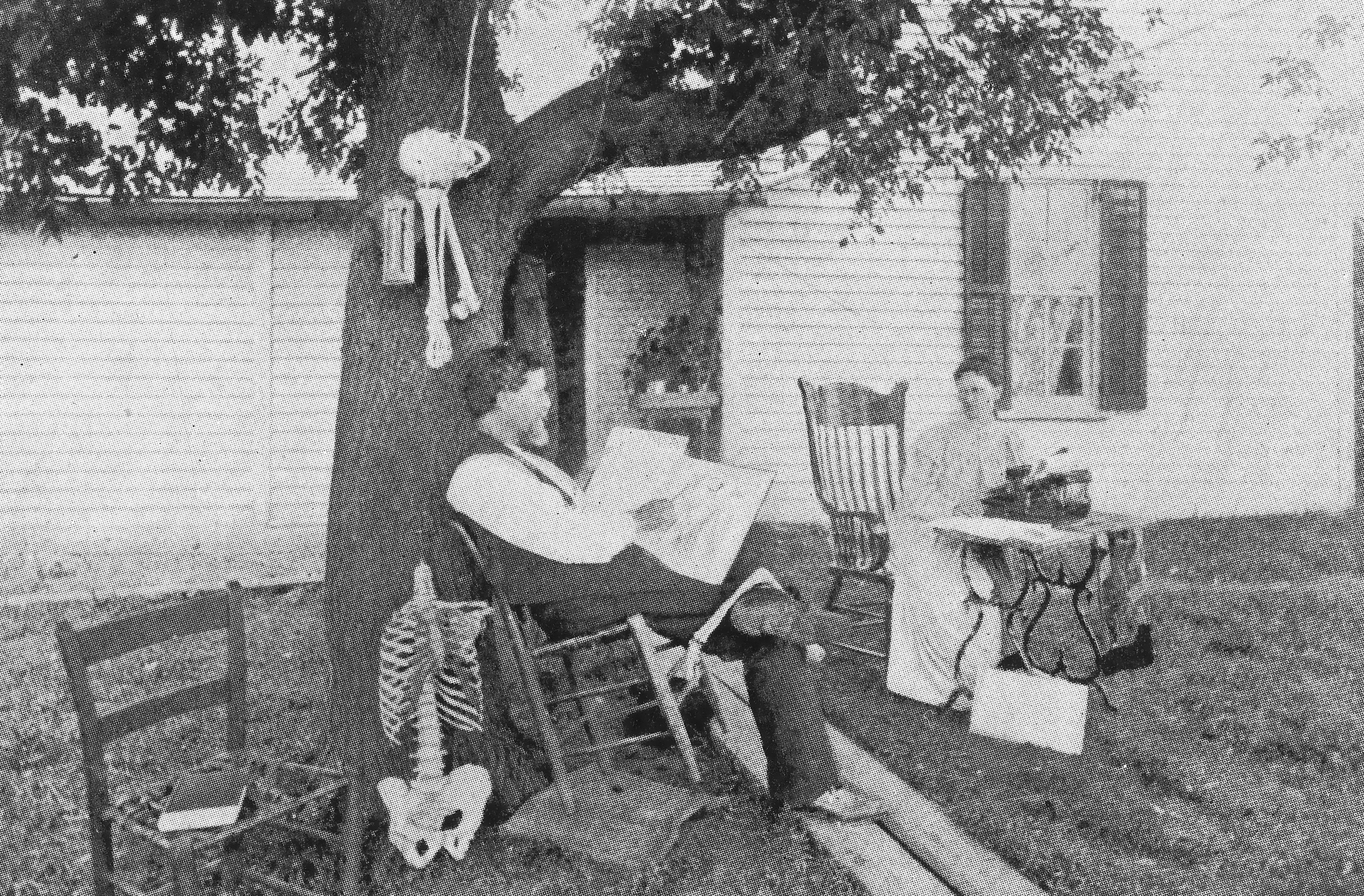
Andrew Taylor Still with Mrs. Annie Morris, his amanuensis, who is at a typewriter

Still believed that osteopathy was a necessary discovery because the current medical practices of his day often caused significant harm and conventional medicine had failed to shed light on the etiology and effective treatment of disease. At the time Still practiced as a physician, medications, surgery and other traditional therapeutic regimens often caused more harm than good. Some of the medicines commonly given to patients during this time were arsenic, castor oil, whiskey and opium. Additionally, unsanitary surgical practices often resulted in more deaths than cures.

Still sought to reform existing 19th-century medical practices. Still investigated pseudoscientific and alternative treatments, such as hydropathy, diet, bonesetting, and magnetic healing. Still found appeal in the relatively tame side effects of those modalities and imagined that someday "rational medical therapy" would consist of manipulation of the musculoskeletal system, surgery and very sparing use of drugs, including anesthetics, antiseptics and antidotes. He invented the name osteopathy by blending two Greek roots osteon- for bone and -pathos for condition in order to communicate his hypothesis that disease and physiologic dysfunction were etiologically grounded in a disordered musculoskeletal system. Thus, by diagnosing and treating the musculoskeletal system, he believed that physicians could treat a variety of diseases and spare patients the negative side-effects of drugs.

Still founded the first school of osteopathy based on this new approach to medicine; the school was called the American School of Osteopathy (now A.T. Still University) in Kirksville, Missouri, in 1892.

Still was also one of the first physicians to promote the idea of preventive medicine and the philosophy that physicians should focus on treating the disease rather than just the symptoms.

Still defined osteopathy as:

that science which consists of such exact, exhaustive, and verifiable knowledge of the structure and function of the human mechanism, anatomical, physiological and psychological, including the chemistry and physics of its known elements, as has made discoverable certain organic laws and remedial resources, within the body itself, by which nature under the scientific treatment peculiar to osteopathic practice, apart from all ordinary methods of extraneous, artificial, or medicinal stimulation, and in harmonious accord with its own mechanical principles, molecular activities, and metabolic processes, may recover from displacements, disorganizations, derangements, and consequent disease, and regained its normal equilibrium of form and function in health and strength.

In a 1907 interview by the Topeka Daily Capital newspaper, A.T. Still's son, Charles Still, D.O., described his father's philosophy that the body would operate smoothly into old age, if properly maintained and that every living organism possessed the ability to produce all the necessary chemicals and materials to cure itself of ailments.

== Publications ==
Still published four books during his life. His first book, published in 1897, was entitled Autobiography of Andrew Taylor Still with a History of the Discovery and Development of the Science of Osteopathy. A revised edition of the book was re-published in 1908 after a fire damaged the original printing plates. In 1899, Still published his second book, Philosophy of Osteopathy.

Still published his third book, The Philosophy and Mechanical Principles of Osteopathy, with publication date 1902, and copyright date 1892. He published Osteopathy Research and Practice, his fourth and final book in 1910.

== See also ==
- S. S. Still—nephew of Andrew Taylor Still, and an osteopath on the faculty of A. T. Still University
