= Physicians in the United States =

U.S. physicians per 10,000 people, 1850-2009

Physicians are an important part of health care in the United States. The vast majority of physicians in the US have a Doctor of Medicine (MD) degree, though some have a Doctor of Osteopathic Medicine (DO) or Bachelor of Medicine, Bachelor of Surgery (MBBS).

The American College of Physicians uses the term physician to describe specialists in internal medicine, while the American Medical Association uses the term physician to describe members of all specialties.

There is a physician shortage in the U.S., which is in part a result of lobbying by the American Medical Association to restrict supply of physicians. Around a quarter of physicians in the US are international medical graduates, meaning recent attempts at reducing H-1B and J-1 visas are also contributing to the physician shortage problems in the US. International graduates provide comparable care versus US medical school graduates, and are a critical part of the workforce.

Physicians in the United States are generally better-paid than physicians in other advanced economies. U.S. physicians' annual earnings average $350,000, with variations across specialties and disciplines.

== Working conditions ==
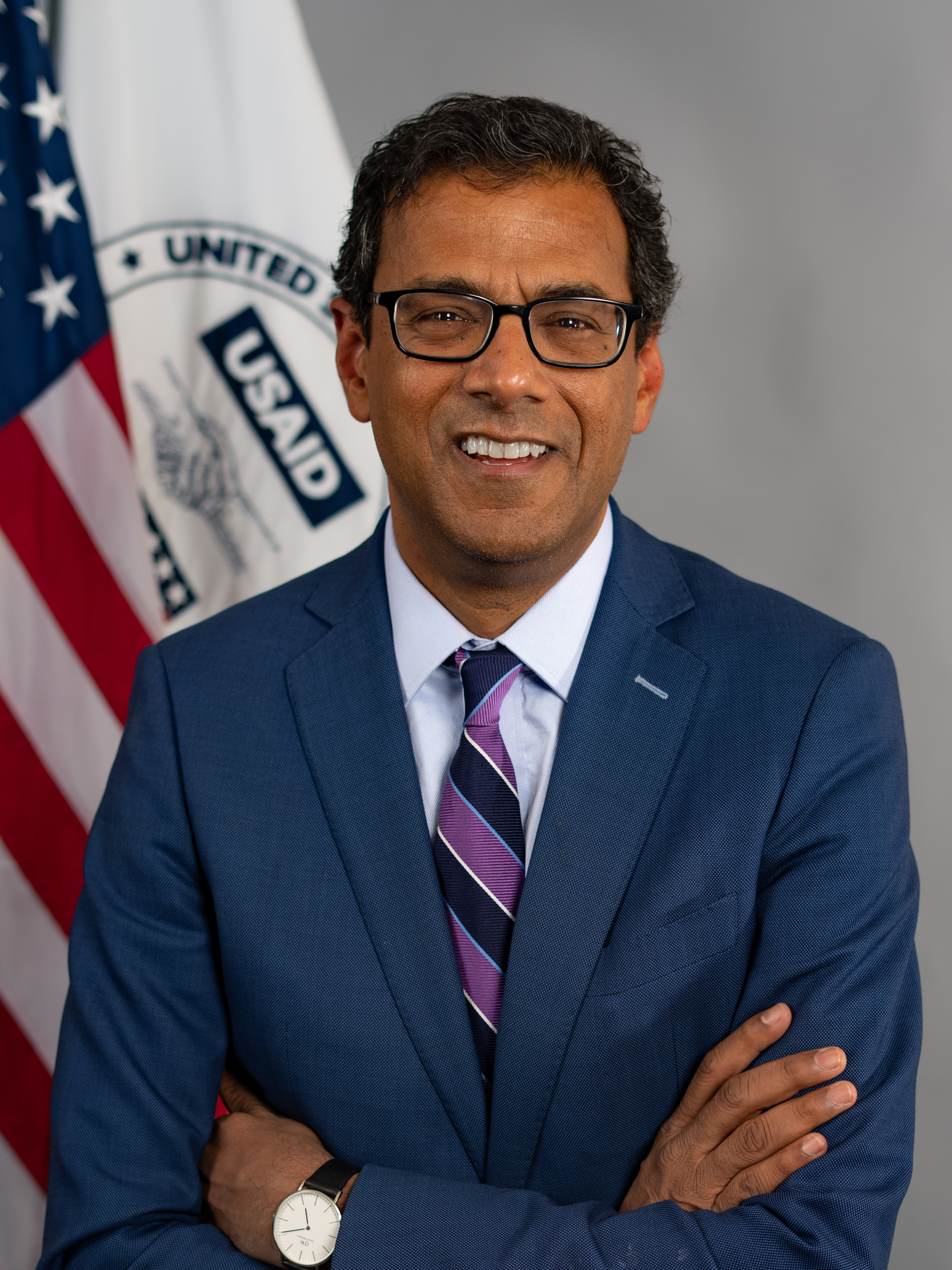
A surgeon, writer, and public health researcher, Dr. Gawande is known for his contributions to healthcare quality, patient safety, and end-of-life care. He has authored several bestselling books and articles on healthcare reform and medical ethics.

Doctors may work independently, as part of a larger group practice, or for a hospital or healthcare organization. Independent practices are defined as one in which the physician owns a majority of his or her practice and has decision making rights. In 2000, 57% of doctors were independent, but this decreased to 33% by 2016. Between 2012 and 2015, there was a 50% increase in the number of physicians employed by hospitals. 26 percent have opted out of seeing patients with Medicaid and 15 percent have opted out of seeing patients with health insurance exchange plans.

According to a 2025 study, U.S. physicians' annual earnings average $350,000. The earnings vary across specialties and regions. Primary care physicians, the most common specialty, have the lowest earnings. The highest earners tend to be specialists who perform procedures and surgeons. Physician salaries in the United States comprise 8.6% of total national healthcare spending.

On average, physicians in the US work 55 hours each week. 25% of physicians work more than 60 hours per week.

== Demographics ==
While an impending "doctor shortage" has been reported, from 2010 to 2018, the actively licensed U.S. physician-to-population ratio increased from 277 to 301 physicians per 100,000 people. Additionally, the number of female physicians, and osteopathic and Caribbean graduates have increased at a greater percentage.

As of 2018, there were over 985,000 practicing physicians in the United States. 90.6% have an MD degree, and 76% were educated in the United States. 64% were male. 82% were licensed in a medical specialty. 22% held active licenses in two or more states. The percentage of females skews younger. In 2018, 33% of female physicians were under 40 years old, compared with 19% of male physicians. The District of Columbia has, by far, the largest number of physicians as a percentage of the population, with 1,639 per 100,000 people. Additionally, Among active physicians, 56.2% identified as White, 17.1% identified as Asian, 5.8% identified as Hispanic, 5.0% identified as Black, and 0.3% identified as American Indian/Alaska Native.

== Specialists ==
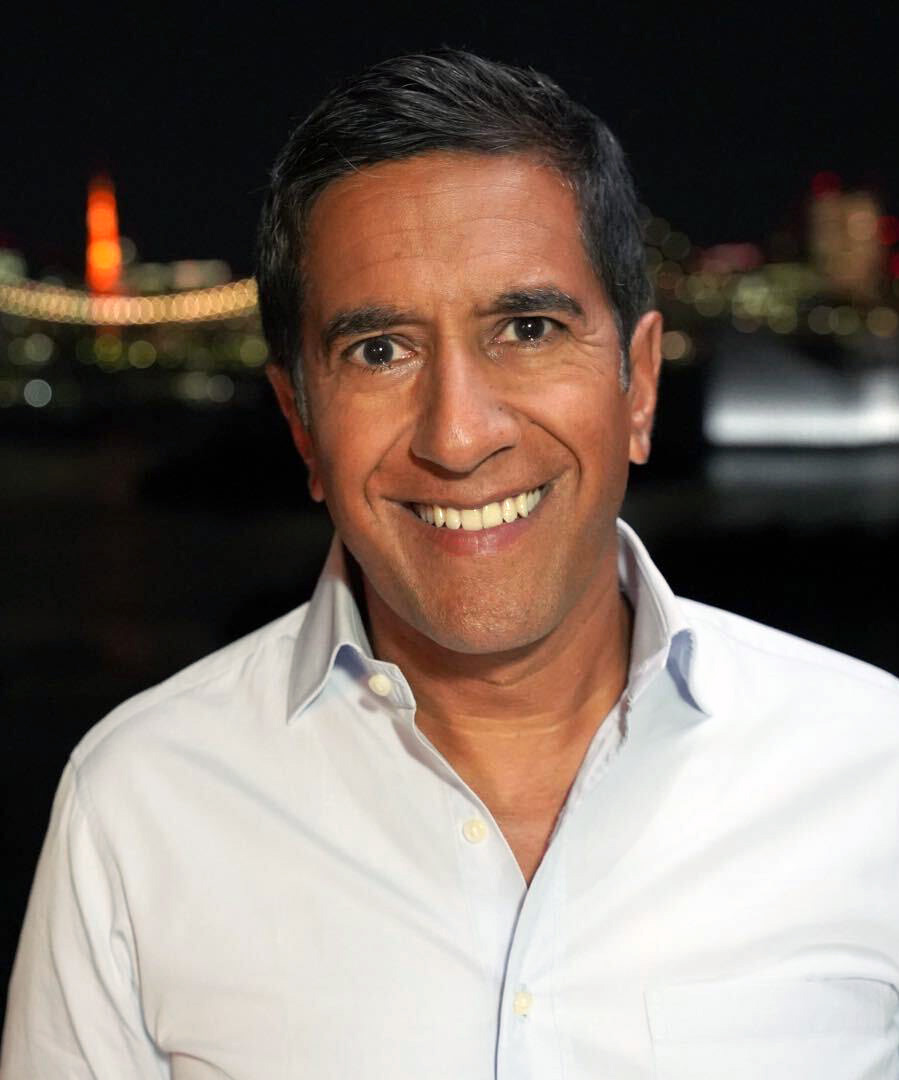
A neurosurgeon, medical reporter, and CNN's chief medical correspondent, Dr. Gupta is known for his ability to communicate complex medical information to the public.

The term hospitalist was introduced in 1996, to describe US specialists in internal medicine who work largely or exclusively in hospitals. Such 'hospitalists' now make up about 19% of all US general internists.

There are three agencies or organizations in the United States which collectively oversee physician board certification of medical and osteopathic physicians in the United States in the 26 approved medical specialties recognized in the country. These organizations are the American Board of Medical Specialties and the American Medical Association; the American Osteopathic Association Bureau of Osteopathic Specialists and the American Osteopathic Association; the American Board of Physician Specialties and the American Association of Physician Specialists. Each of these agencies and their associated national medical organization functions as its various specialty academies, colleges, and societies.

All boards of certification now require that medical practitioners demonstrate, by examination, continuing mastery of the core knowledge and skills for a chosen specialty. Recertification varies by particular specialty between every eight and ten years.

== Salaries ==
=== Pay gap by gender and race ===
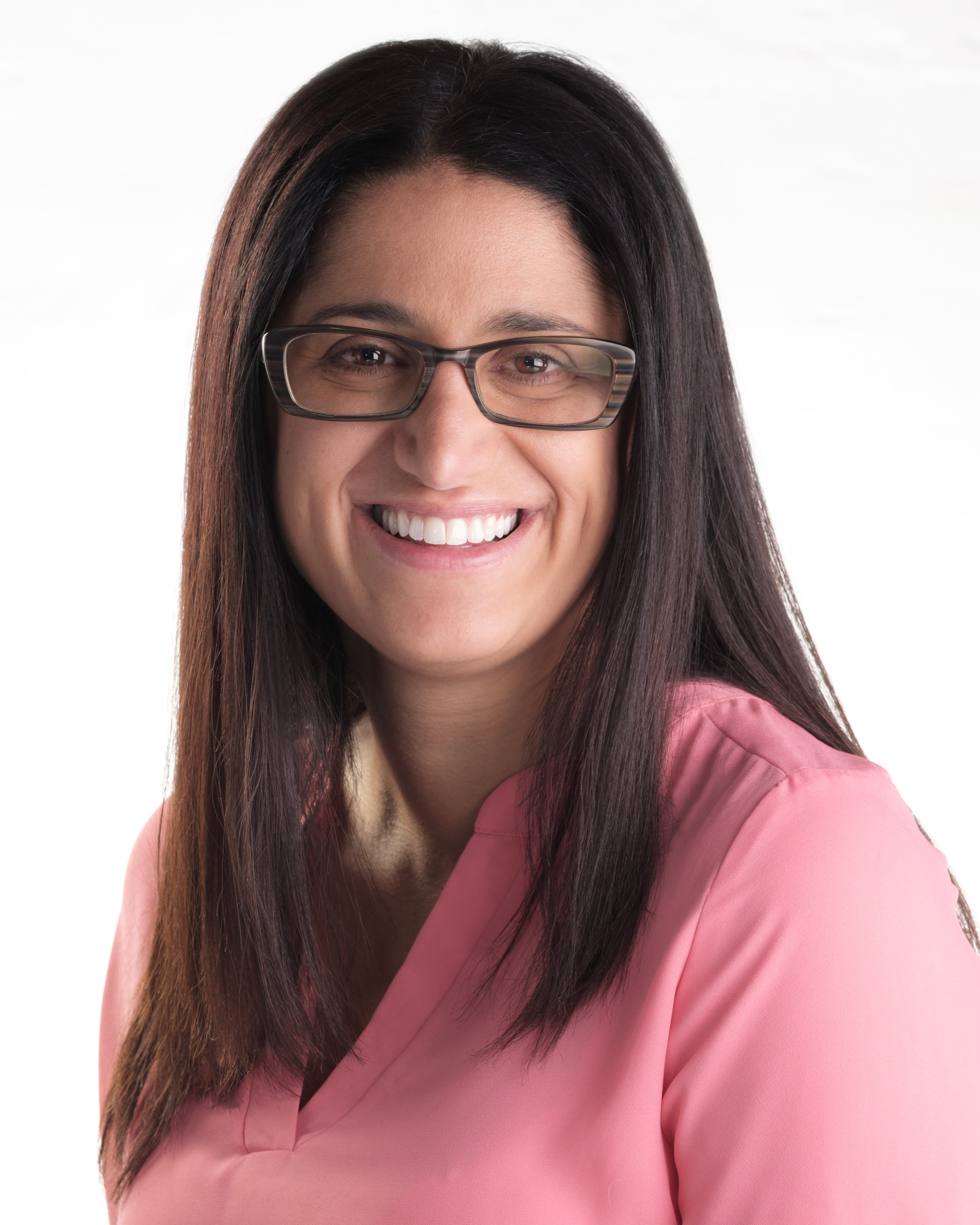
Mona Hanna-Attisha pediatrician and public health advocate, Dr. Hanna-Attisha played a crucial role in uncovering the Flint water crisis and advocating for the health of children affected by lead poisoning.

The average salary for white male physicians was $253,000 compared with $188,230 for black male physicians, $163,000 for white female physicians, and $153,000 for black female physicians.

Medscape's 2019 Physician Compensation Report found that "males out-earned their female counterparts in both primary care and specialist positions with men earning 25% and 33% more, respectively." A 2011 survey of 15,000 physicians practicing in the United States reported that, across all specialties, male physicians earned approximately 41% more than female physicians. Female physicians were more likely to report working fewer hours than their male counterparts.

The AMA has advocated to reduce gender bias and close the pay gap. The AMA said that "significant sex differences in salary exist even after accounting for age, experience, specialty, faculty rank, and measures of research productivity and clinical revenue." A 2015 study of gender pay disparities among hospitalists found that women were more likely to be working night shifts despite having lower salaries. In 2018, the AMA delegates advocated for transparency in defining the criteria for initial and subsequent physician compensation, that pay structures be based on objective, gender-neutral objective criteria, and that institutes take a specified approach using metrics for all employees to identify gender disparity.

The AMA has also advocated to move USMLE Step 1 to pass/fail to decrease racial bias. A 2020 study showed lack of diversity within specialities and that that underrepresented students were more likely to go into specialities that have lower Step 1 cut offs like Primary Care.

=== Pay cuts due to COVID ===
One in five physicians reported having a pay cut during the COVID-19 pandemic. The majority of the monetary loss was a result of low volume of patients and lack of elective surgeries.

=== Compared to foreign countries ===
The United States has the highest paid general practitioners in the world. The US has the second-highest paid specialists in the world behind the Netherlands. Public and private payers pay higher fees to US primary care physicians for office visits (overall 27 percent more for public and 70 percent more for private) than in Australia, Canada, France, Germany and the United Kingdom. US primary care physicians also earn more (overall earning $186,000 yearly) than the foreign counterparts, with even higher numbers for physician compensation for medical specialists. Higher fees, rather than factors such as higher practice costs, volume of services, or tuition expenses, mainly drive higher US spending.

=== Variations within the US ===
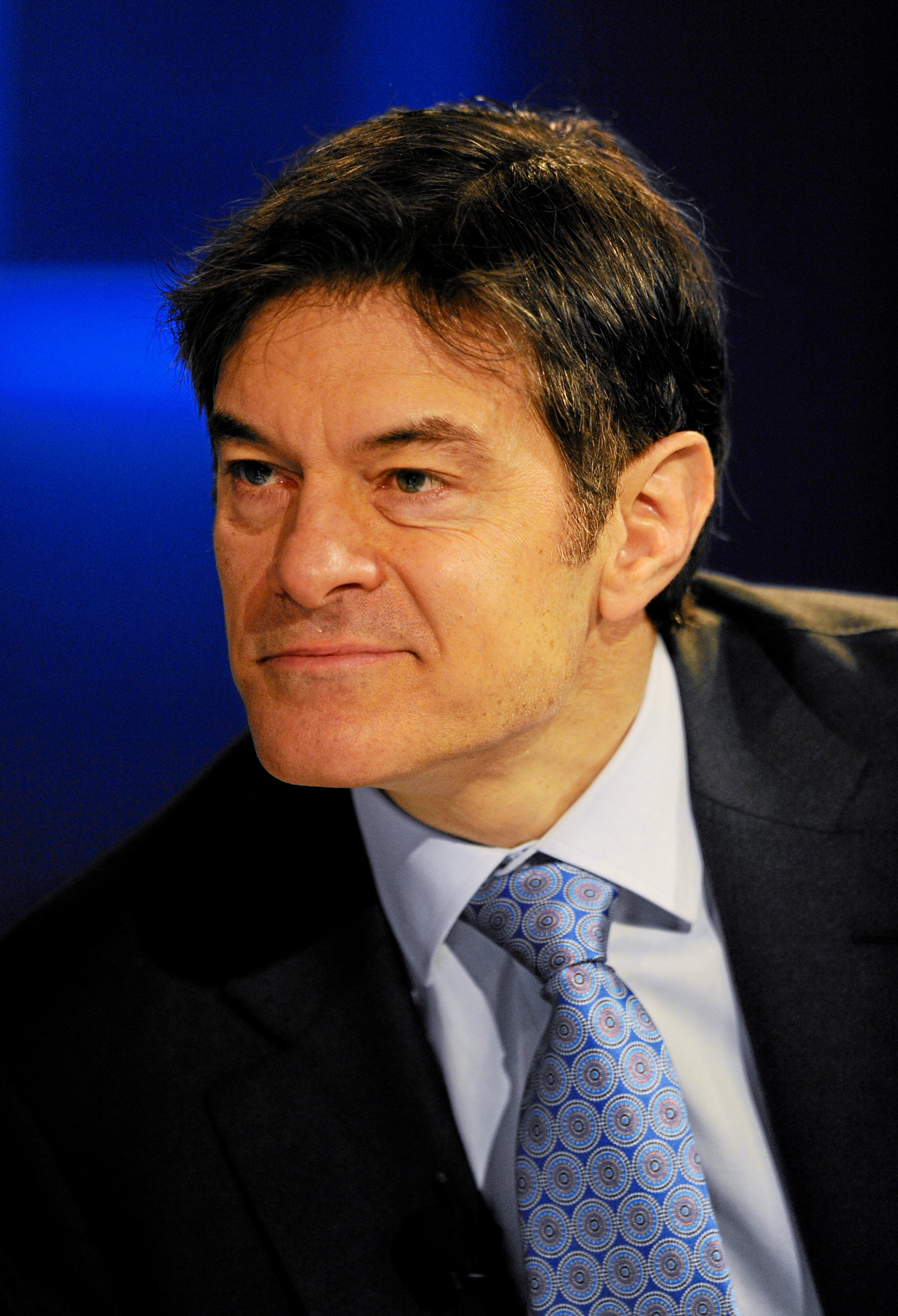
Mehmet Oz cardiothoracic surgeon and host of The Dr. Oz Show, Dr. Oz is known for his advocacy of alternative medicine and holistic health practices.

A 2011 survey of 15,000 physicians practicing in the United States found that the highest-earning physicians were located in North Central region, comprising Kansas, Nebraska, North and South Dakota, Iowa, and Missouri, with a median salary of $225,000 per year, as per 2010. The next highest earning physicians were those in the South Central region, comprising Texas, Oklahoma, and Arkansas, at $216,000. Those physicians reporting the lowest compensation levels were located in the Northeast and Southwest, earning an across-specialty median annual income of $190,000.

The survey concluded that physicians in small cities (50,000–100,000) earned slightly more than those living in community types of other sizes, ranging from metropolitan to rural, but the differences were only marginal (a few percent more or less). Other results from the survey were that those running a solo practice earned marginally less than private practice employees, who, in turn, earned marginally less than hospital employees.

== Medical education ==
The US medical education for physicians includes participation in a US medical school that eventually grants a US form of Doctor of Medicine (M.D.) degree or a Doctor of Osteopathic Medicine degree. During the process of medical school, physicians who wish to practice in the U.S. must take standardized exams, such as the United States Medical Licensing Examination steps 1, 2 and 3 or Comprehensive Osteopathic Medical Licensing Examination Level 1, 2, and 3.

In addition, the completion of a residency is required to practice independently. Residency is accredited by the ACGME and is the same regardless of degree type. After residency, physicians can become board certified by their specialty board. Physicians must have a medical license to practice in any state.

== See also ==
- Health policy
- Health workforce
- Healthcare in the United States
- Medical deserts in the United States
- Medical education in the United States
- Physician shortage in the United States
- Primary care service area
