= Physician supply =

Supply of doctors in a system

Medical doctors per 1,000 people in 2018.

The physician supply is the number of licensed physicians working in a health care system or active in the labor market. The supply depends not only on the number of graduates of medical schools in a country or jurisdiction, but also on the number continuing to practice medicine as a career path and remaining in their country of origin. The number of physicians needed in a given context depends on several different factors, including the demographics and epidemiology of the local population, the numbers and types of other health care practitioners working in the system, and the policies and goals in place of the health care system. If more physicians are trained than needed, supply exceeds demand. If too few physicians are trained and retained, some people may have difficulty accessing health care services. A physician shortage is a situation in which there are not enough physicians to treat all patients in need of medical care. That can be observed at the level of a given health care facility, a province/state, a country, or worldwide.

Globally, the World Health Organization (WHO) estimates a shortage of 4.3 million physicians, nurses, and other health workers worldwide, especially in many developing countries. Developing nations often have physician shortages because of limited numbers and capacity of medical schools and because of human capital flight to higher income countries. Many developed countries also report doctor shortages, which traditionally happened in rural and other underserved areas. Shortages exist and are growing in the United States, Canada, the United Kingdom, Australia, New Zealand, and Germany.

Several causes of the current and anticipated shortages have been suggested, but not everyone agrees that there is a true physician shortage, at least in the United States. On the KevinMD medical news blog, for example, it has been argued that inefficiencies introduced into the healthcare system, often driven by government initiatives, have reduced the number of patients physicians can see. By forcing physicians to spend much of their time on data entry and public health issues, the initiatives have limited the available time for direct patient care by physicians.

== Determinants ==
=== Economic theory and trends ===
Supply and demand curves with equilibrium

Anything that changes the number of available physicians or the demand for their services affects the supply and demand balance. If the number of physicians is decreased or the demand for their services increases, an undersupply or shortage can result. If the number of physicians increases or demand for their services decreases, then an oversupply can result.

Substitution factors can significantly affect the production of physician services and the availability of physicians to see more patients. For example, an accountant can replace some of the financial responsibilities for a physician who owns their own practice and allow for more time to treat patients. Disposable supplies can substitute for labor and capital (the time and equipment needed to sterilize instruments). Sound record keeping by physicians can substitute for legal services by avoiding malpractice suits.

However, the extent of substitution of physician production is limited by technical and legal factors. Technology cannot replace all skills possessed by physicians, such as surgical skill sets. Legal factors can include allowing only licensed physicians to perform surgeries but nurses or doctors to administer other surgical care.

The demand for physicians is also dependent on a country's economic status. Especially in developing nations, health care spending is closely related to the growth of the gross domestic product (GDP). Theoretically, as GDP increases, the health care labor force expands and, in turn, physician supply also increases. However, developing countries face additional challenges in retaining competent physicians to higher-income countries such as the United States, Australia, and Canada. The emigration of physicians from lower-income and developing countries contribute to Brain drain and creates issues on maintaining sufficient physician supply. However, higher-income countries can also experience an outflow of physicians who decide to return to their naturalized countries after they have received extensive education and training, and such nations never benefit from their gained medical knowledge and skill set.

=== Number of physicians trained ===
Increasing the number of students enrolled in existing medical schools is one way to address physician shortage, and another is increasing the number of schools, but other factors may also play a role.

Becoming a physician requires either several years of training beyond undergraduate education or a professional undergraduate degree with a duration longer than that of a typical undergraduate degree. Consequently, physician supply is affected by the number of students eligible for medical training. Students who do not finish earlier levels of education, including high school dropouts and in some places those who leave university without an undergraduate or associate degree, do not qualify for entrance to medical school. The more people that fail to complete the prerequisites, the fewer people become eligible for training as physicians.

In most countries, the number of placements for students in medical schools and clinical internships is limited, reasons include a limited number of teachers, limited funding provided by governments and doctors voting to restrict numbers of medical students. In many countries that do not charge tuition payments to prospective physicians, public funding is the only significant limitation on the number of physicians trained. In the United States, the American Medical Association says that federal funding is the most important limitation in the supply of physicians. The high cost of tuition combined with the cost of supporting themselves during medical school discourages some people from enrolling to become a physician. Limited scholarships and financial aid to medical students may exacerbate that problem, and low expected pay for practicing physicians in some countries may convince some that the cost is not appropriate.

It has been speculated that politics and social conditions may motivate medical student placements. For example, racial quotas have been cited in some places as preventing some people from enrolling in medical school. Racial discrimination and gender discrimination, either overt or disguised, have also been cited as resulting in people being denied the opportunity to train as a physician on the basis of their race or gender.

=== Number of physicians working ===
Once trained, the current supply of physicians can be affected by the number of those who continue to practice that profession. The number of working physicians can be affected by:

- The number of medical school graduates who:
  - Choose to practice as a physician for their career; for example, some might choose instead to work in medical research, public policy, or other areas in which medical expertise is required, or they may choose a job in which no medical knowledge is required.
  - Fail to obtain or requalify for their license or other professional requirements for legal practice.
  - Are unable to find work of their choice; studies in Mexico have found high levels of unemployment among trained physicians in urban areas even while large rural populations remain medically underserved.
- The number of physicians who:
  - Exit the workforce, such as by retiring.
  - Migrate abroad for better economic and social conditions, also referred to as "brain drain."
  - Work part-time; in particular, the number working only part-time does not affect the overall number of physicians, but it affects the supply of physician services (e.g. in terms of full-time equivalents). Many physicians may retain their professional license while they work part-time or after they retire. Consequently, the reported number of active physicians is probably overstated in many jurisdictions.
- Changes in the specialty balance; for example, in many countries, the balance is shifting away from medical students becoming general practitioners (GP) because of more attractive pay for medical specialists, which leads to shortages of physicians for primary care.
- Changes in the practice environment; for example, changing legal conditions have been cited in the US, Canada and elsewhere as inciting physician attrition, notably the adoption of laws that require doctors to refer for certain procedures (such as abortion or sex change) with which the doctors disagree on moral or religious grounds.

=== Demand for physician services ===
The demand for physician services is influenced by the local job market (e.g. the number of job openings in local health care facilities), the demographics and epidemiology of the population being served, the nature of the health policies in place for health care delivery and financing in a jurisdiction, and also the international job market (e.g. the increasing demand in other countries puts pressure on local competition). As of 2010, the WHO proposes a ratio of at least one primary care physician per 1000 people to sufficiently attend the basic needs of the population in a developed country.

For example, population aging has been attributed with increased demand for physician services in many countries, as more previously young and healthy people become older with increased likelihood of a variety of chronic medical conditions associated with ageing, such as type 2 diabetes mellitus, hypertension, osteoporosis, and some types of cancers and neurodegenerative diseases.

==== US Patient Protection and Affordable Care Act ====
In the United States, the Patient Protection and Affordable Care Act has expanded health insurance coverage and access to an estimated 32 million United States citizens, increasing the demand of physicians, especially primary care physicians, across the country. Expanded coverage is predicted to increase the number of annual primary care visits between 15.07 million and 24.26 million by 2019. If stable levels of physicians' productivity are assumed, between 4,307 and 6,940 additional primary care physicians would be needed to accommodate that increase.

The Act may have also affected the supply of Medicaid physicians. Incentives and higher reimbursement rates may have increased the number of physicians accepting Medicaid patients up to 2014. With the expansion of Medicaid and a decrease in incentives and reimbursement rates in 2014, the supply of physicians in Medicaid may drop substantially and cause the supply of Medicaid physicians to fluctuate. A study examining variation between states in 2005 showed that the average time for Medicaid reimbursements was directly correlated with Medicaid participation, and physicians in states with faster reimbursement times had a higher probability of accepting new Medicaid patients.

== Effects ==
Physician shortages have been linked to a number of effects, including:

- Lower quantity of medical care for patients, which limits the ability of health systems to meet primary health care goals, such as the Millennium Development Goals.
- Lower quality of medical care for patients because of shorter doctor visits.
- Increased workload and too many patients per doctor resulting in overworked and sleep-deprived doctors, which compromises patient safety.
- Unnecessary patient deaths while waiting for health care.
- Higher prices for practicing physicians because of less competition by the rules of supply and demand in market-driven health care economies.
- The shortage of obstetricians in parts of the United States has led to coining of the phrase "maternity desert."

== Maternity deserts ==
There are thousands of women in the United States who live in counties that do not have obstetrical care available. Arizona has two counties with no care available for pregnant women. Awareness to the lack of access to care is increasing in Arizona, and the Phoenix area seems to be heading toward a maternity desert. From 2009 to 2019, there was a 12% reduction in obstetricians delivering babies in Arizona despite a growth in the general population.

== Proposed solutions ==
A number of solutions, including short-term fixes and long-term solutions, have been proposed to address physician shortages. Some have been tested and applied in national health workforce policies and plans, while others remain subject to ongoing debate.

- Increase the number of medical graduates, number of medical schools and classroom sizes.
- To address physician shortages in rural areas, develop, organize, and locate medical schools to increase the propensity of physicians entering rural practice. Accepting medical school applicants from rural areas can also increase the proportion of rural physicians.
- To address physician shortages in high population growth areas in the United States unfreeze the 1996 Graduate Medical Education (GME) freeze/cap instituted by Congress.
- Higher medical school enrollment limits.
- Brain draining doctors from developing countries (also known as International Medical Graduates).
- Loosen the requirements for entry to medical school, such as eliminating the need for a pre-med bachelor's degree as required in some jurisdictions, thereby making the education path more attractive for potential students.
- Reduce the costs for students to attend medical school, such as through subsidies for (free or reduced) school tuition and more financial aid.
- Legislate tuition-increase caps for medical schools.
- Increase the role of the National Health Service Corps, which help provide debt-relief opportunities for primary care physicians.
- Improve the political, social and economic conditions in developing countries to prevent brain drain, including fewer wars and conflicts.
- Make better use of other categories of health care professionals, including more nurse practitioners, physician assistants, clinical officers, community health workers, and others.
- Improve physician wages, such as through privatization of health care systems thereby enhancing market attractiveness for people to become doctors.
- Improve physicians' perspectives of their future career path, such as though reduced use of temporary employment contracts
- Provide better incentives for physicians to practice in underserved areas – for example, in the U.S., this would include expanding incentives for the National Health Service Corps in rural, urban, and suburban areas experiencing shortages.
- Ensure better practice conditions for physicians – for example, medical liability reforms have been cited as an important factor in the U.S.
- Increase the use of e-mail and telephone consultations, which allow physicians to treat patients seeking more traditional forms of care.
- In the United States, to better accommodate the elderly and their demand for healthcare services, increase medical and nursing training in geriatrics and gerontology.
- Increase use of health care or medical teams (i.e. nurse practitioners and physician assistants) to shift physician workload and allow for increased physician times with patients.

== Global view ==
In the US alone, the Association of American Medical Colleges (AAMC) estimates a shortage of 91,500 physicians by 2020 and up to 130,600 by the year 2025. As previously mentioned, the World Health Organization (WHO) estimates a shortage of 4.3 million physicians, nurses and other health workers worldwide. The WHO produced a list of countries with a “Human Resources for Health crisis”. In these countries, there are only 1.13 doctors for every 1,000 people, while in the United States, there are approximately 2.5 doctors for every 1,000 people. One quarter of physicians practicing in the United States are brain drained from foreign, typically lower income countries with a lower doctor supply. Thousands of foreign doctors come to practice in the United States each year while only a few hundred doctors from the United States leave to practice in foreign countries even short-term.

There are various organizations that assist United States physicians and others in serving internationally. These organizations may be filling temporary or permanent positions. Two temporary agencies are Global Medical Staffing and VISTA staffing. A locum doctor will serve in the temporary absence of another physician. These positions are typically 1-year placements but can vary by location, specialty, and other factors. Agencies that attempt to provide international aid in various ways often have a strong medical component. Some of these organizations helping to provide medical care internationally include Reach Out Worldwide (ROWW), Doctors Without Borders (Médecins Sans Frontières), Mercy Ships, the US Peace Corps, and International Medical Corps.

Additionally, smaller non-profits that work regionally around the world have also implemented task-shifting strategies in order to increase impact. Non profits, such as the MINDS Foundation educated community health workers or teachers to perform simple medicinal tasks, thereby freeing up health professionals to focus on more pressing concerns.

== See also ==
- Artificial scarcity
- Health policy
- Health workforce
- Medical desert
- Nursing shortage
- Physician shortage in the United States
- Primary care service area
