= NHSC (disambiguation) =

NHSC may refer to:

Canada

- National Historic Sites of Canada—also simply called National Historic Sites

United Kingdom

- NHS Connecting for Health

United States

- New Hampshire Supreme Court
- National Health Service Corps
- National Home Study Council, now known as the Distance Education and Training Council
