= Eric Redman =

Eric Redman may refer to:

- Eric Redman (businessman) (born 1948), American author and businessman
- Eric Redman (politician) (born 1946), Idaho state representative
