= Medical education in the United States =

Educational activities training physicians in the United States

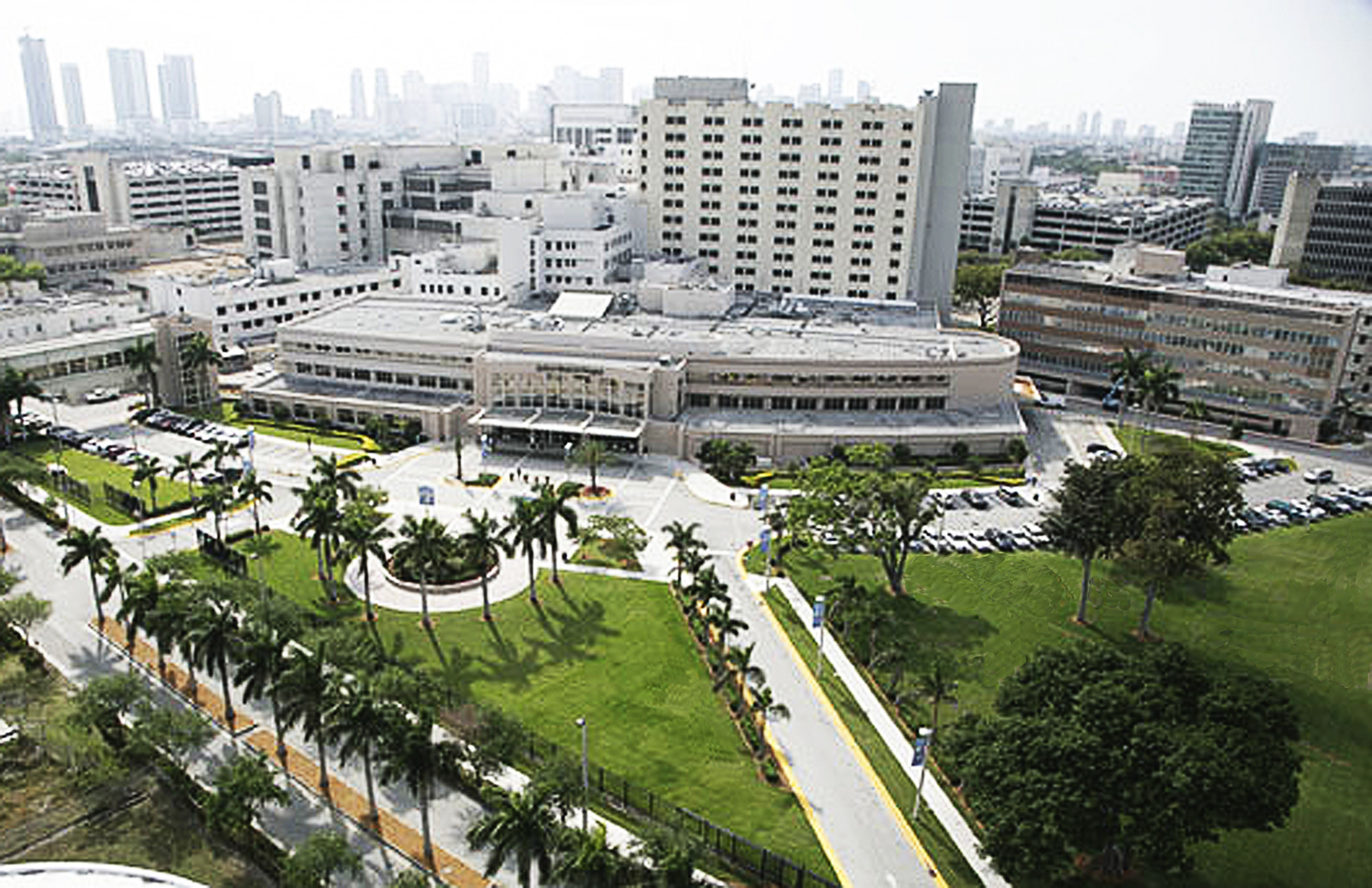
Jackson Memorial Hospital in Miami, Florida, which serves as the primary teaching hospital for the Miller School of Medicine at the University of Miami

Medical education in the United States includes educational activities involved in the education and training of physicians in the country, with the overall process going from entry-level training efforts through to the continuing education of qualified specialists.

A typical outline of the medical education pathway is presented below. Medicine is a diverse profession with many options available. For example, some physicians work in pharmaceutical research, occupational medicine (within a company), public health medicine (working for the general health of a population in an area), or even join the armed forces in America. Others are primary care physicians in private practice and still others are employed by large health systems.

Issues in higher education in the U.S. have particular resonance in this context, with multiple analysts expressing concern about a physician shortage in the nation. Others say maldistribution is a bigger challenge, and medical deserts have been a topic of concern.

== Medical school ==
In the U.S., a medical school is an institution with the purpose of educating medical students in the field of medicine. Most medical schools require students to have already completed an undergraduate degree, although the CUNY School of Medicine in New York City is one of the few in the U.S. that integrates pre-med with medical school.

Once enrolled in a medical school, the usually four years of progressive study (sometimes three years or five years) is often divided into two components: pre-clinical (consisting of didactic courses in the basic sciences) and clinical (clerkships consisting of rotations through different wards of a teaching hospital). Historically, these two parts were roughly equal, but the pre-clerkship phase has been getting shorter in recent years with the clinical phase becoming longer. Many schools have also created meaningful clinical roles for students, starting as early as the first year. This provides clinical context for the foundational concepts and is important in professional identity formation.

Interprofessional education (IPE) is becoming an increasingly important part of medical school. IPE entails students from health care disciplines studying together to enhance teamwork and teaming skills and improve patient care results. This method is especially pertinent as health care services are transitioning to a team oriented approach.

The degree granted at the conclusion of medical school is Doctor of Medicine (M.D.) or Doctor of Osteopathic Medicine (D.O.) depending on the institution. Both degrees allow the holder to practice medicine after completing an accredited residency program.

=== Financing a medical school education ===
Most U.S. medical students fund medical school themselves through a combination of personal and family resources and loans. A total of 73% of medical school graduates have education debt, with $200,000 being the average amount of debt. This cost contributes to the lack of economic diversity among U.S. medical students with nearly a quarter of all medical students coming from families with incomes in the top 5% of the country. Half of all U.S. medical students come from families with incomes in the top quintile.

The various options to defray the costs of medical school include scholarships and service commitments (military or public service). Some medical schools also no longer charge tuition.

== Residency ==
During the last year of medical school, students apply for residencies, also referred to as graduate medical education (GME), in their chosen field of specialization. These vary in competitiveness depending upon the desirability of the specialty, the prestige of the program, and the number of applicants relative to the number of available positions. All but a few positions are granted via a national computer match algorithm. This algorithm prioritizes the preferences of the applicant and pairs them with programs that also prefer them.

Residents are both trainees and employees of the health system hosting the GME program, and the amount of graduate medical education required for licensure as a physician who can practice independently varies by state. A minimum of one year of graduate medical education is required in some states with many states requiring two years or more. International medical graduates may be subject to additional requirements.

In July 2015, the Accreditation Council for Graduate Medical Education, the American Osteopathic Association, and the American Association of Colleges of Osteopathic Medicine signed a memorandum of understanding to work toward a single accreditation system for residencies that would train MD and DO physicians. This process concluded in June 2020, and MD and DO students participate in a single match. The single match increased the match rates for graduates of osteopathic medical schools.

The Accreditation Council for Graduate Medical Education has established Common Program Requirements and a shared competency framework for all accredited residencies, although each specialty defines its own learning objectives and required experiences. Programs range from 3 years after medical school for internal medicine and pediatrics, to 5 years for general surgery, to 7 years for neurosurgery.

== Fellowship ==
A fellowship is a formal, full-time training program that focuses on a particular area within the specialty, with requirements beyond the related residency. Many highly specialized fields require formal training beyond residency. Examples of these include cardiology, endocrinology, oncology after internal medicine; cardiothoracic anesthesiology after anesthesiology; cardiothoracic surgery, pediatric surgery, surgical oncology after general surgery; reproductive endocrinology/infertility, maternal-fetal medicine, gynecologic oncology after obstetrics/gynecology. There are many others for each field of study. In some specialties such as pathology and radiology, a majority of graduating residents go on to further their training. The training programs for these fields are known as fellowships and their participants are fellows, to denote that they already have completed a residency and are board eligible or board certified in their basic specialty. Fellowships range in length from one to three years and are granted by application to the individual program or sub-specialty organizing board. Fellowships often contain a research component.

== Board certification ==
Physicians must pass exams in their specialty in order to become board certified. Some specialty boards also require logs of early practice experiences. Each of the 24 medical specialties has different requirements for practitioners to undertake continuing medical education activities. Doctors don’t need to be board certified to practice, but not being board certified can limit their employment opportunities and increase the cost of their malpractice insurance; some health insurance plans don’t accept them as providers.

== Continuing medical education ==
Continuing medical education (CME) refers to educational activities designed for practicing physicians. Many state licensing boards and specialty certification boards require physicians to earn a certain amount of CME credit in order to maintain their licenses and certifications. Physicians can receive CME credit from a variety of activities, including attending live events, publishing peer-reviewed articles, and completing online courses. There are three major physician credit systems in the United States: that of the American Academy of Family Physicians (AAFP), the American Medical Association (AMA) and the American Osteopathic Association (AOA). The AAFP, AMA (in conjunction with the Accreditation Council for Continuing Medical Education (ACCME), and AOA determines the requirements for CME activities in their respective systems.

There is a growing emphasis on diversity, equity and inclusion (DEI) in education. Tackling health inequities and providing care are vital aspects of medical instruction. Medical institutions are placing importance on DEI efforts, including attracting and supporting minority students integrating competence training and advocating for diversity, among faculty and leaders. These initiatives strive to establish a health care workforce that mirrors the patient communities it serves.

== Trends in medical education ==
=== Diversity, equity, and inclusion ===
There is a growing emphasis on diversity, equity and inclusion (DEI) in education. Tackling health inequities and providing care are vital aspects of medical instruction. Medical institutions are placing importance on DEI efforts, including attracting and supporting students from historically minoritized communities, integrating competence training, and advocating for diversity among faculty and leaders. These initiatives strive to establish a health care workforce that mirrors the patient communities it serves.

In June 2023, the U.S. Supreme Court struck down the use of affirmative action in college admissions, including medical school.

=== Master adaptive learner model ===
In recognition of the exponential growth in medical knowledge, an increasing number of medical schools are incorporating the master adaptive learner model. This metacognitive approach to learning or "learning to learn" is based on self-regulation that fosters the development and use of adaptive expertise in practice. This concept emphasizes the importance of lifelong learning, self-regulation, and adaptability, enabling health professionals to provide high-quality care in an ever-changing environment.

=== Health systems science ===
In recognition of the increasing complexity of the health system, health systems science (HSS) is becoming a more common part of medical education. HSS is a foundational platform and framework for the study and understanding of how care is delivered, how health professionals work together to deliver that care, and how the health system can improve patient care and health care delivery. Some medical schools integrate health systems science throughout all four years. HSS has also been integrated into graduate medical education and continuing professional development.

== See also ==
- Health in the United States
- Issues in higher education in the United States
- The Flexner Report
- Combined internal medicine and psychiatry residency
- Integrated medical curriculum
- List of medical schools in the United States
- History of public health in the United States
- African American student access to medical schools
