= National Health Service Corps =

US medical scholarship program

The National Health Service Corps (NHSC) is part of the United States Department of Health and Human Services, division of Health Resources and Services Administration, Bureau of Health Workforce.

Members are health professionals providing primary health care services in underserved communities since 1972. In exchange, the providers are given either loan repayment or scholarship throughout their medical education, not to exceed four years.

The scholarship program provides for students' reasonable educational expenses (tuition, books and other required services like health insurance) and a monthly stipend for room and board. After school (and residency for medical, osteopathic medical, and dental students) the student must apply for preapproved positions in underserved areas. The student must apply just like any job applicant. Applicants who choose a specialty other than primary care or otherwise do not fulfill the service requirement must repay the government three times the investment with interest.

The loan repayment program works similarly, but students apply for the program after school and the NHSC repays up to $50,000 every two years. There is also the option to work in an NHSC-approved location for five years, which potentially entitles the student to receive $170,000 in loan repayment. Also, there are more available positions because the criteria are less stringent.

The legislative battle to establish the NHSC was the subject of the book "The Dance of Legislation" by Eric Redman.
