= Medical deserts in the United States =

Areas with limited access to healthcare in the United States

The United States has many regions which have been described as medical deserts, with those locations featuring inadequate access to one or more kinds of medical services. An estimated thirty million Americans, many in rural regions of the country, live at least a sixty-minute drive from a hospital with trauma care services. Nearly half of Americans live over 25 miles from one of the nation's top-ranked hospitals, limiting their access to specialized and high-quality medical care. This geographic barrier significantly affects health outcomes, particularly for those in rural areas. Regions with higher rates of Medicaid and Medicare patients, as well those who lack any health insurance coverage, are less likely to live within an hour of a hospital emergency room. Although concentrated in rural regions, health care deserts also exist in urban and suburban areas, particularly in predominantly Black communities in Chicago, Los Angeles and New York City. Racial demographic disparities in healthcare access are also present in rural areas, particularly in Native American communities which experience worse health outcomes and barriers to accessing quality medical care. Limited access to emergency room services, as well as medical specialists, leads to increases in mortality rates and long-term health problems, such as heart disease and diabetes.

Between 2010-2021, 136 hospitals in rural regions closed their doors, unable to bear worker shortages, low patient volume, and financial burdens of the COVID-19 pandemic. In addition to the immediate financial problems facing rural healthcare providers, inequities in rural healthcare are further aggravated by the disproportionately low amount of newly graduated doctors that are willing to work in rural areas. Addressing the doctor shortage in the U.S. remains a challenge in terms of improving healthcare in America. In the 2010s, a study released by the Association of American Medical Colleges (AAMC) projected a shortage of between 37,800 and 124,000 physicians, which impact rural and underserved communities the most directly.

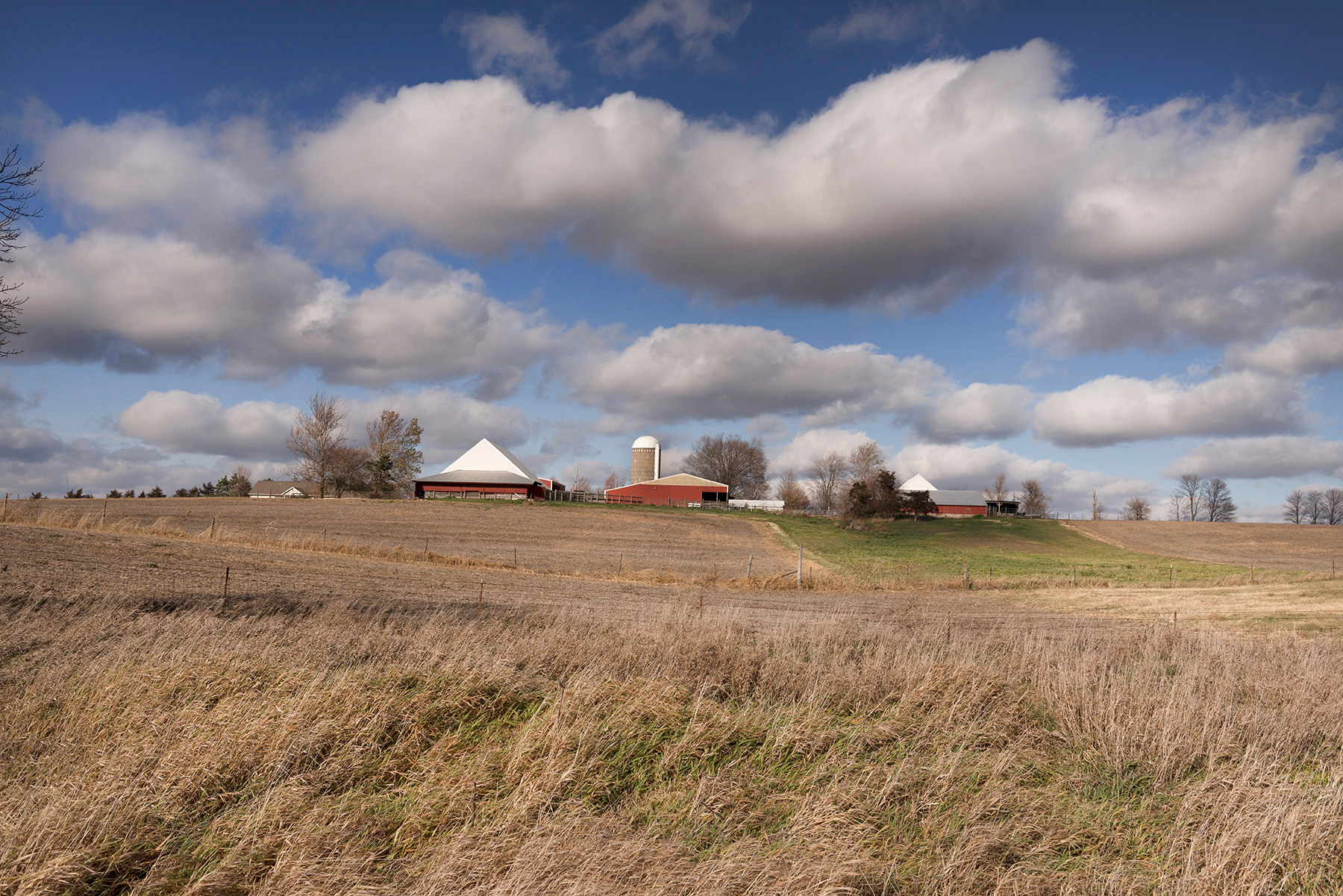
Rural farmland in America

Proposed solutions to US health care deserts include the enactment of a national single payer health care system; adoption of a public option under the Affordable Care Act (ACA); the approval of higher Medicare reimbursements and tax credits for struggling hospitals; the establishment of strategically placed free-standing emergency centers; the expansion of telehealth and telemedicine to remote areas; and increased incentives to recruit doctors to practice in rural and underserved areas.

== In rural areas ==
In 2019, the federal government identified nearly 80 percent of rural America as “medically underserved,” lacking in skilled nursing facilities, as well as rehabilitation, psychiatric and intensive care units. Access to rural healthcare is limited, as there are approximately 5.1 primary care doctors per 10,000 people, whereas there are 8.0 doctors per 10,000 in urban centers. About 8% of rural counties had no doctors in 2019. Rural communities face lower life expectancy and increased rates of diabetes, chronic disease, and obesity. Fewer than half of rural women live within a thirty-minute drive of the nearest hospital able to provide obstetric services, and 12% do not live within a sixty-minute drive of the nearest such hospital, resulting in increased maternal and infant mortality rates.

Rural residents may live on farms, ranches and Indian reservations far from a hospital, forcing residents to take several hours or an entire day off work to drive to a doctor's appointment or follow up care, making rural residents less likely to seek treatment. The Centers for Disease Control and Prevention (CDC) reports that during 1999–2014 rural counties experienced increased mortality rates from the five leading causes of death (1-heart disease, 2-cancer, 3-unintentional injury, 4-chronic lower respiratory disease (CLRD), 5-stroke) compared with metropolitan counties. Unintentional injuries (high speed car accidents; opioid and drug abuse and traumatic brain injuries) mortality rates, were "approximately 50% higher in rural areas than urban areas", with lack of access to adequately staffed healthcare facilities listed as one among several factors leading to this disparity.

There is a disproportionately higher population of older adults over 65 who live in rural areas, with 17.5% of rural populations being over 65 versus 13.8% in urban areas. This means that medical deserts in rural areas have a more significant impact on the older adult population in rural areas since there is a higher ratio than in urban areas. Those over 65 years old are also more likely to require medical services for chronic conditions such as hypertension and heart disease. Living in a rural medical desert for older adults, then, could mean less of a chance to be able to receive treatment for such chronic conditions.

In states that chose not to expand Medicaid programs under the Affordable Care Act–Alabama, Georgia, Missouri, Oklahoma, Texas and Tennessee–rural Americans face limited options as hospitals close their doors. A 2019 study found that participation in Medicaid expansion reduced the likelihood of rural hospital closures by 62% and that of the hospitals deemed most at-risk for closure, 75% were in states that did not expand Medicare.

In 2016, the Kaiser Commission on Medicaid and the Uninsured, in conjunction with the Urban Institute, conducted a case study analysis of three privately owned Southern hospitals to determine the causes and effects of their closures in Kansas, Kentucky and South Carolina. In addition to the challenges of graying, declining and poverty-stricken populations, as well as the preference of privately insured patients to seek treatment at newer hospitals further away, the report said corporate profit-driven decisions, as opposed to local community needs, shuttered the doors of rural hospitals in underserved areas. In a "shift from mission to margin," health systems that owned multiple hospitals, some more profitable than others, closed less-profitable hospitals in Kentucky and South Carolina to concentrate resources on other hospitals in the chain, resulting in communities without acute care and emergency facilities to serve as a safety-net for patients facing challenges with mental health and drug use. The case studies report also notes that decreases in Medicare and Medicaid reimbursements, some the result of federal budget sequestration or across the board cuts, others the result of the Affordable Care Act's lower hospital Medicare readmission reimbursement rates, negatively impacted the finances of the rural hospitals.

=== Physician shortages ===
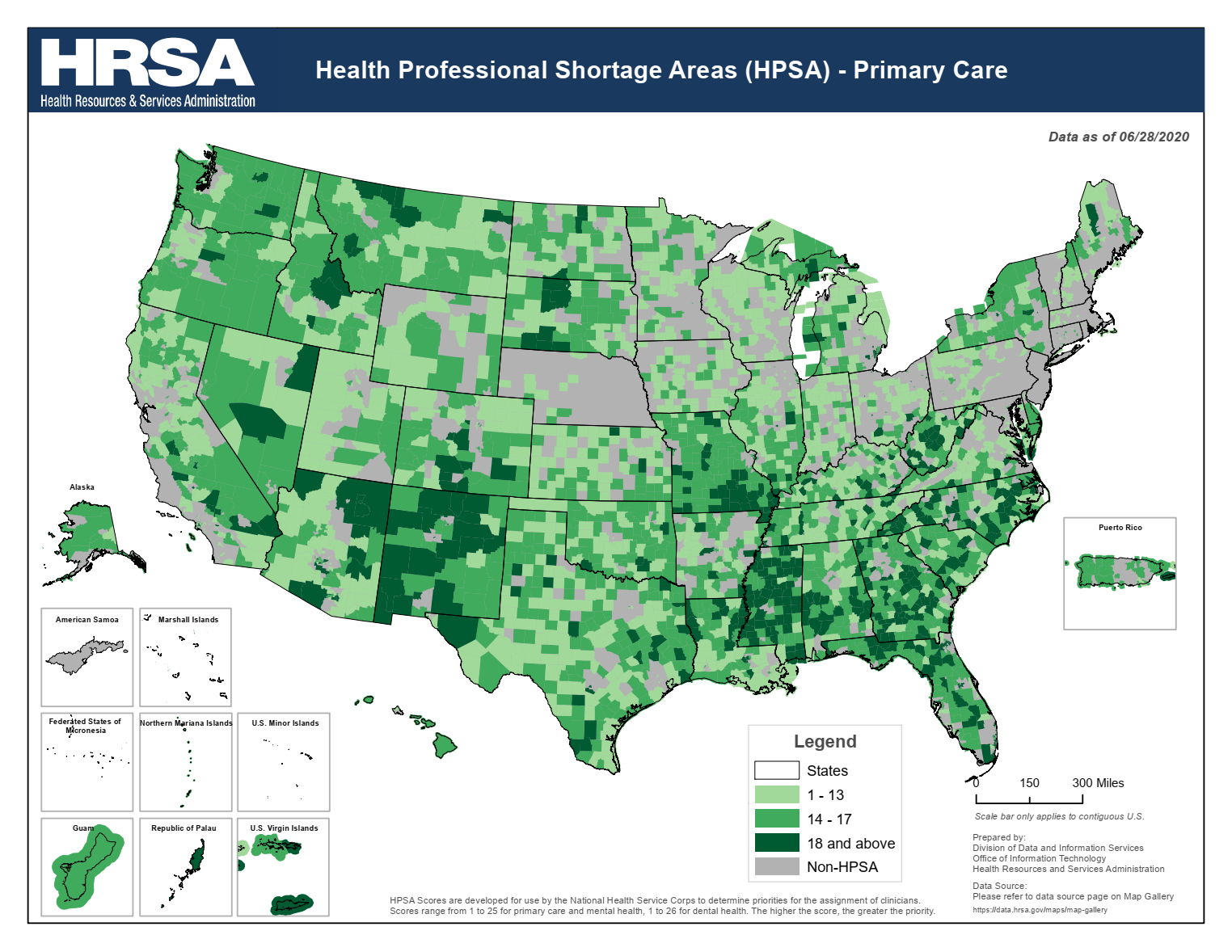
Health Professional Shortage Areas map from the U.S. Federal Government, June 2020

While approximately 20% of Americans live in rural regions, only 9% of the country's doctors practice in rural areas. The average age of doctors in rural areas has increased, with over 50% of rural physicians over the age of 50. In 2019, it was predicted that the number of rural doctors would decline by 23% by 2030 due to these physicians retiring. The Association of American Medical Colleges (AAMC) projects a shortage of 13,500 to 86,000 physicians by 2036, with non-primary care specialties facing the largest gaps. Rural areas, already experiencing limited healthcare access, are expected to be disproportionately affected. An additional contributing factor to this decline is newly graduated doctors' reluctance to move to rural areas. Doctors originally from rural areas are more likely to practice in rural regions, however, a study from the Association of American Medical Colleges found that the percentage of rural Americans enrolling in medical school is declining. A 2023 survey of physicians found that 68% of newly graduated doctors wanted to work in hospitals, rather than jobs in family practices that are more common in rural areas. Additionally, only 4% of resident physicians wanted to work in a community of 25,000 or less, highlighting the difficulty in recruiting new physicians to rural areas.

The lack of entertainment or food diversity, fear of prejudice, and reduced financial prospects associated with rural regions have been cited as factors leading to medical students' reluctance to practice in rural regions, as well as the unique difficulties associated with practice rural healthcare. For example, in parts of rural Alaska, transferring patients to hospital emergency rooms can "depend on the schedules of rickety charter planes" which are often prevented from flying due to the weather. In some states, such as Oklahoma, a lack of available residency programs for prospective doctors directly contributes to a shortage.

US Health Professional Shortage Areas (Facilities), June 2020

=== Impact on Native Americans and Alaskan Natives ===
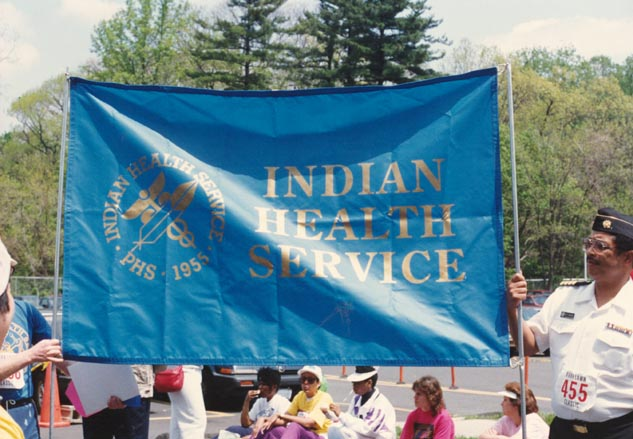
Indian Health Service (IHS) Banner

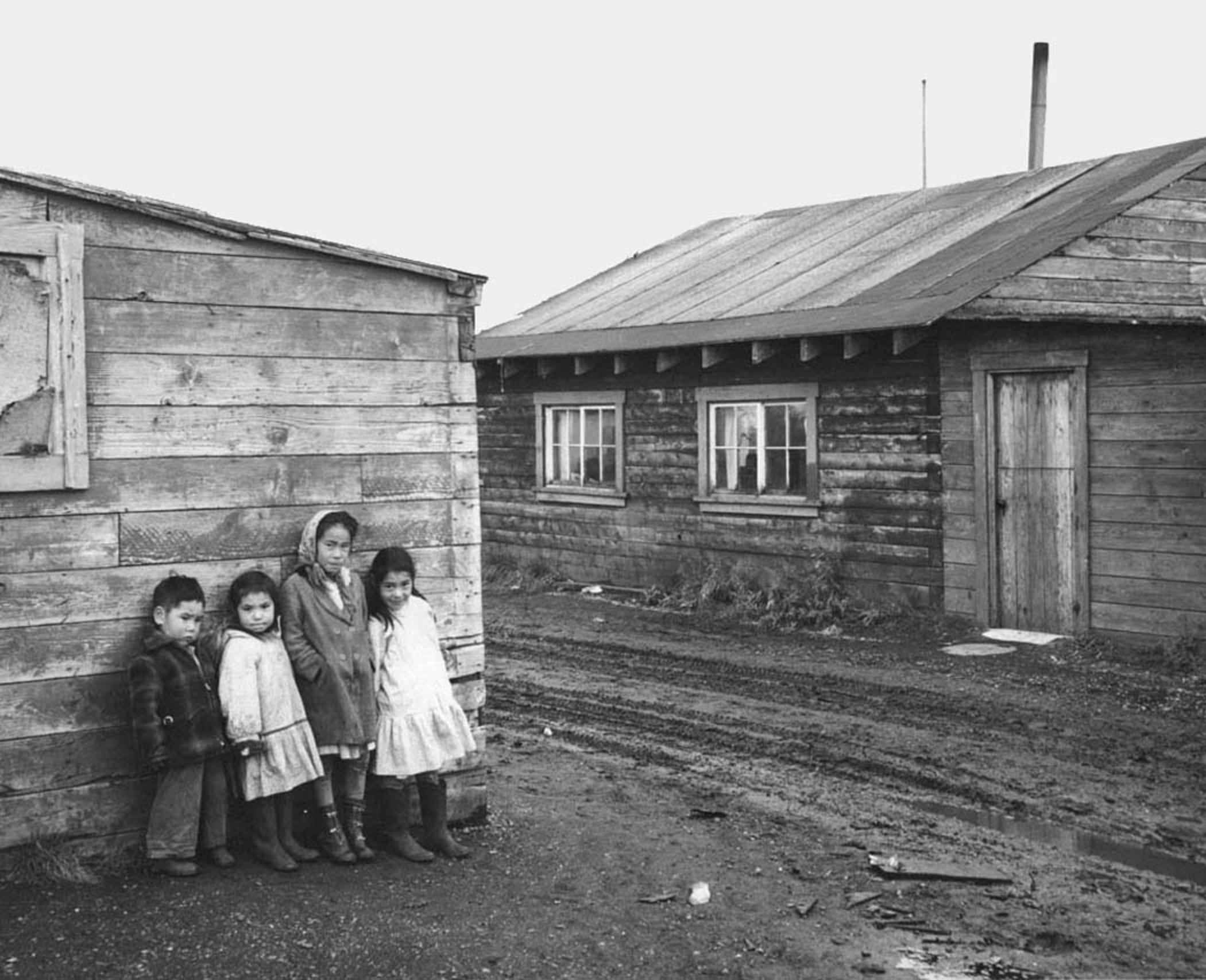
Native Alaskan children standing in front of their homes.

Native American and Alaska Native populations often face even greater healthcare disparities. Many live in remote regions where limited healthcare facilities and insufficient funding for Indian Health Service programs restrict access to essential medical care, resulting in poorer health outcomes. The federal government is legally obligated under treaties to provide medical care to American Indian and Alaska Native Americans through the Indian Health Service (IHS), part of the United States Department of Health and Human Services. Advocates for the Native American community have argued, however, that the government chronically under funds the IHS, resulting in a lack of accessible health care facilities, particularly emergency room departments for those living on reservations. The IHS provides services to 573 tribes and 2.56 million Native Americans primarily living on or near reservations and in rural areas concentrated in Alaska and the western United States. In 2011, the IHS reported that life expectancy for Native Americans was 73, compared to 78 for all other races in the US, as Native Americans and Alaskan natives were dying at higher rates due to chronic liver disease, diabetes, intentional self-harm and suicide, as well as respiratory diseases. In 2016, the Office of Inspector General (OIG) issued reports criticizing the IHS's hospital care for tribal members, citing lack of oversight, outdated equipment and difficulty in recruiting and retaining skilled staff. Administrators at one hospital interviewed by the OIG complained of aging hospital infrastructure with corroded pipes causing sewage to spill into an operating room.

Dissatisfied with the IHS's management of health clinics and hospitals closest to reservations, tribes have demanded greater control over hospital administration. In July, 2019, the Great Plains Tribal Chairman's Health Board representing 18 tribal communities in South Dakota, North Dakota, Nebraska and Iowa, took over the Rapid City's Sioux San Hospital, where, according to government investigators, patients died as a result of misdiagnoses and treatment by staff members not screened for hepatitis and tuberculosis.

In New Mexico, where Native Americans, in 2020, made up six percent of the population but 25% of positive COVID-19 cases, members of the Navajo Nation live without access to running water to frequently wash their hands, as recommended by the CDC.

== In urban areas ==
According to research conducted in 2019 by University of Chicago Medicine, African American census tracts in large US cities—Chicago, Los Angeles, New York City—are more likely than white majority neighborhoods to be located in trauma care deserts that are greater than five miles from a trauma center offering emergency medical services and specialists: neurosurgeons, cardiac doctors, respiratory therapists.

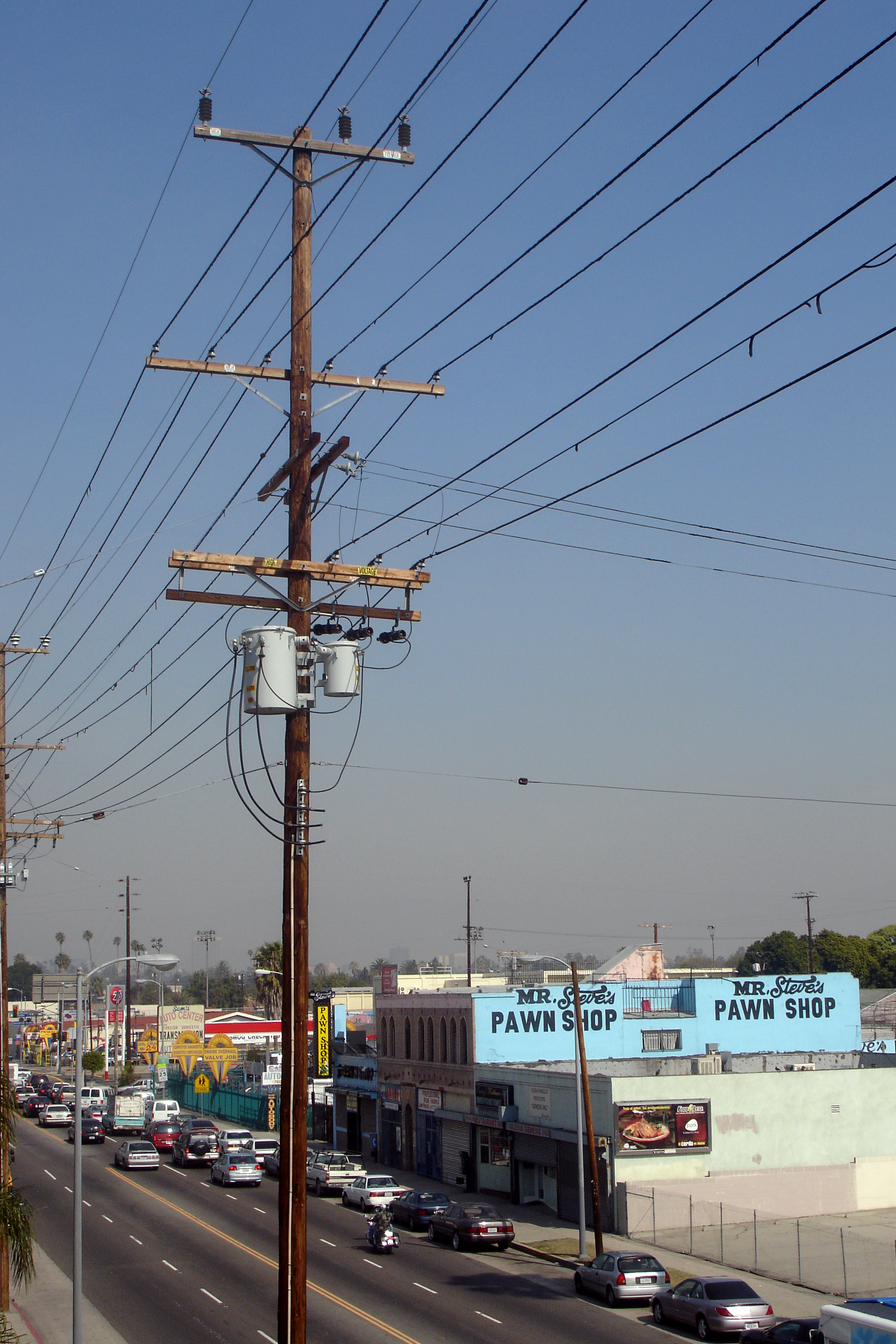
South Los Angeles

A team of researchers found that in Los Angeles 89 percent of Black-majority census tracts were situated in trauma deserts; in Chicago, 73 percent; in New York City 14 percent. In Los Angeles County, South Los Angeles with one-million residents and the highest mortality rate in the county, also has the highest rates of disease and premature deaths from preventable conditions: "coronary heart disease, homicide, diabetes, lung cancer, and motor vehicle crashes." In economically stressed South LA, there are 11 pediatricians for every 100,000 children, whereas in upscale West Los Angeles there are almost 200 pediatricians for every 100,000 children. In West LA, 12 percent of adults are uninsured compared to 30 percent in South LA.

Even as health care delivery models shift from hospitals to community clinics offering Urgent Care in once-vacant retail spaces, poor neighborhoods face inequities with the distribution of community clinics in predominantly wealthier suburban neighborhoods.

=== COVID-19 impacts on urban communities of color ===
African Americans account for a disproportionate number of COVID-19 fatalities due to multiple factors, including greater exposure in use of public transportation and employment in care-giving, sanitation and retail, underlying health conditions, as well as lack of access to nearby medical health clinics and hospitals and inadequate health insurance. In an April 2020 analysis of early data, the Washington Post found that counties with a majority of Black residents faced three times the rate of COVID-19 infections and almost six times the rate of deaths as majority white counties. The American Medical Association (AMA), noting structural inequities gripping communities of color, urged the federal government to collect COVID-19 data by race and ethnicity. Urban communities of color were disproportionately affected by the COVID-19 pandemic. Limited access to primary care, underlying health disparities, and crowded living conditions exacerbated infection rates and worsened outcomes in these populations.

During the COVID-19 crisis, New York Times reporter Michael Schwirtz wrote (April 26, 2020) of the disparities in hospital services and finances between New York's white communities and those of color, with a private hospital closer to Wall Street able to tap reserves and exercise political influence to treat more patients, boost testing and obtain protective gear, even arrange for a plane from billionaire Warren Buffett's company to fly in masks from China, while a Brooklyn public hospital serving patients predominantly poor and of color resorts to plastic and duct tape to separate infectious patients' quarters and launches a Go Fund Me page to raise money for masks, gowns and booties to protect doctors and nurses from a virus that is "killing black and Latino New Yorkers at about twice the rate of white residents."

=== Racial disparities in health care ===
Scholars and researchers trace the roots of African American health care inequities to chattel slavery, Jim Crow laws and institutional racism, with medical schools perpetuating stereotypes of racial inferiority up until the mid 20th century and scientists exploiting African Americans in unethical experimentation without informed consent. Journalist Vann Newkirk writes of Black Codes that led to racially segregated clinics, doctors' offices and hospitals in which African Americans were assigned to separate wings to receive inferior medical treatment. In a 2008 address to the National Medical Association in 2008, Ronald M. Davis, MD, past president of the American Medical Association (AMA), apologized for the organization's history of excluding African-Americans from the AMA, pledging to "right the wrongs perpetrated against African American physicians, their families and patients."

Hundreds of years of geographical segregation left a legacy of segregated and understaffed hospitals serving African American communities. In a departure from the past, the National Association for the Advancement of Colored People (NAACP) in the 1960s won a US Supreme Court victory in Simkins v Moses H. Cone Memorial Hospital, a landmark ruling that barred the use of public funds to expand segregated hospitals. Still, racial segregation in the medical field persists, with African Americans living in black neighborhoods more likely than whites to undergo treatment at hospitals with higher surgical death rates, give birth at hospitals with higher neonatal mortality rates and live in nursing homes with fewer staff members and tenuous finances.

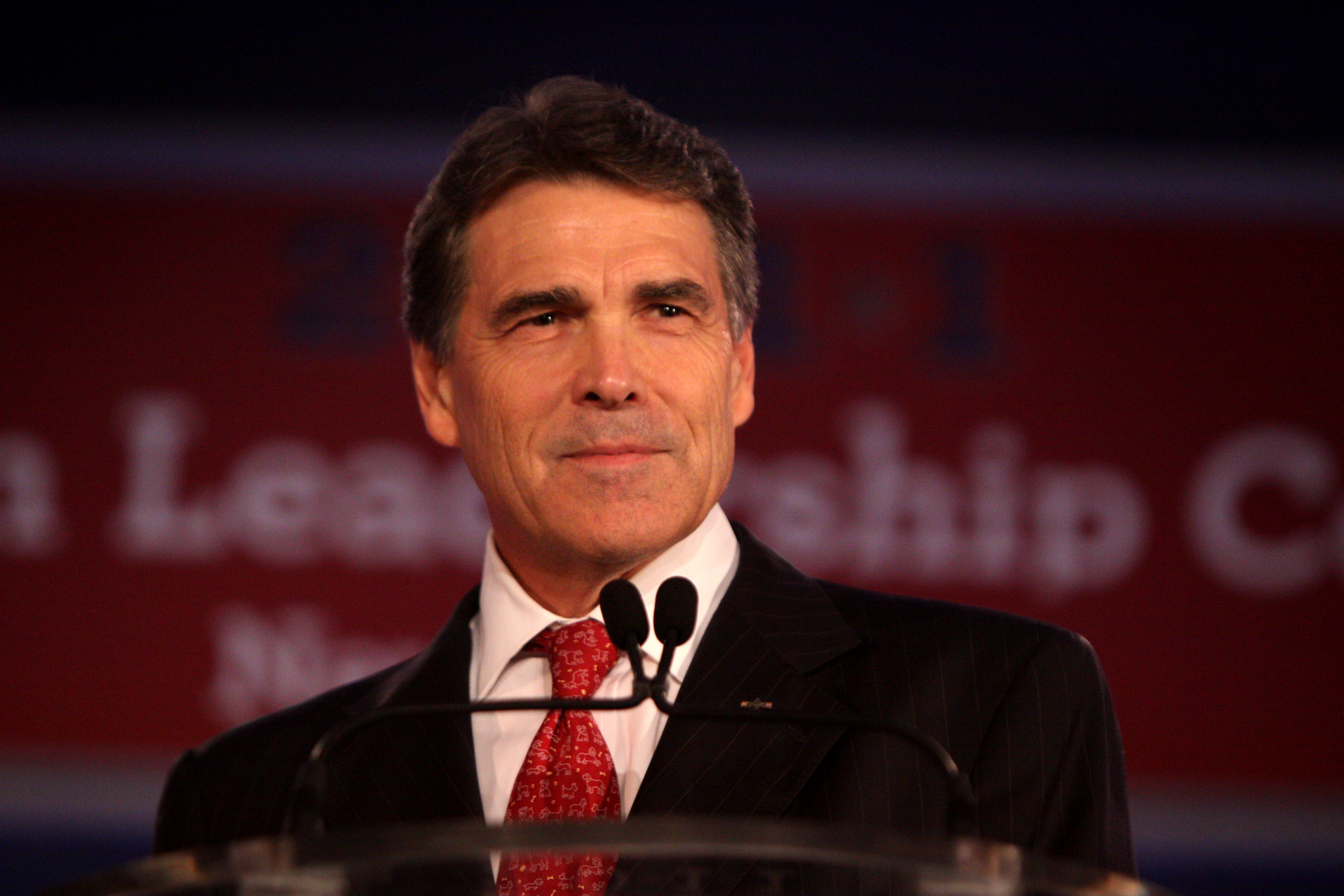
Former Texas Governor Rick Perry speaking at a Republican leadership conference in 2013. Perry opposed Medicare expansion under the Affordable Care Act, resulting in Texas opting out of the expansion.

The 2010 passage of the Affordable Care Act expanded Medicaid eligibility for low income Americans, but several Southern states with large poor black populations opted out of the expansion, its Republican governors opposing the Obama-led initiative as federal over-reach. In rejecting Medicaid expansion—estimated at $100 billion federal dollars over 10 years—then Texas Governor Rick Perry told Tea Party supporters in 2013, "Texas will not be held hostage by the Obama administration's attempt to force us into this fool's errand of adding more than a million Texans to a broken system."

== In suburban areas ==
Though suburbs often conjure images of affluence, a Health Affairs study using national survey data from 2005 to 2015 belies that picture. While suburbs are typically perceived as affluent, around 17 million Americans living in suburban areas experience poverty. Limited public health funding and a lack of accessible healthcare facilities in these regions contribute to gaps in medical care, particularly for uninsured or underinsured residents.

According to the survey, the suburbs, receiving a fraction of public health care funding compared to cities, are home to 17 million Americans who struggle in poverty, exceeding the numbers in urban centers and rural areas and straining hospitals with aging infrastructure. Additionally, the Health Affairs study noted large numbers of uninsured or Medicaid-reliant suburban dwellers either can't find doctors and hospitals who will serve them or must travel great distances to see specialists.

== Proposed solutions ==
=== Single-payer healthcare / Medicare for All ===
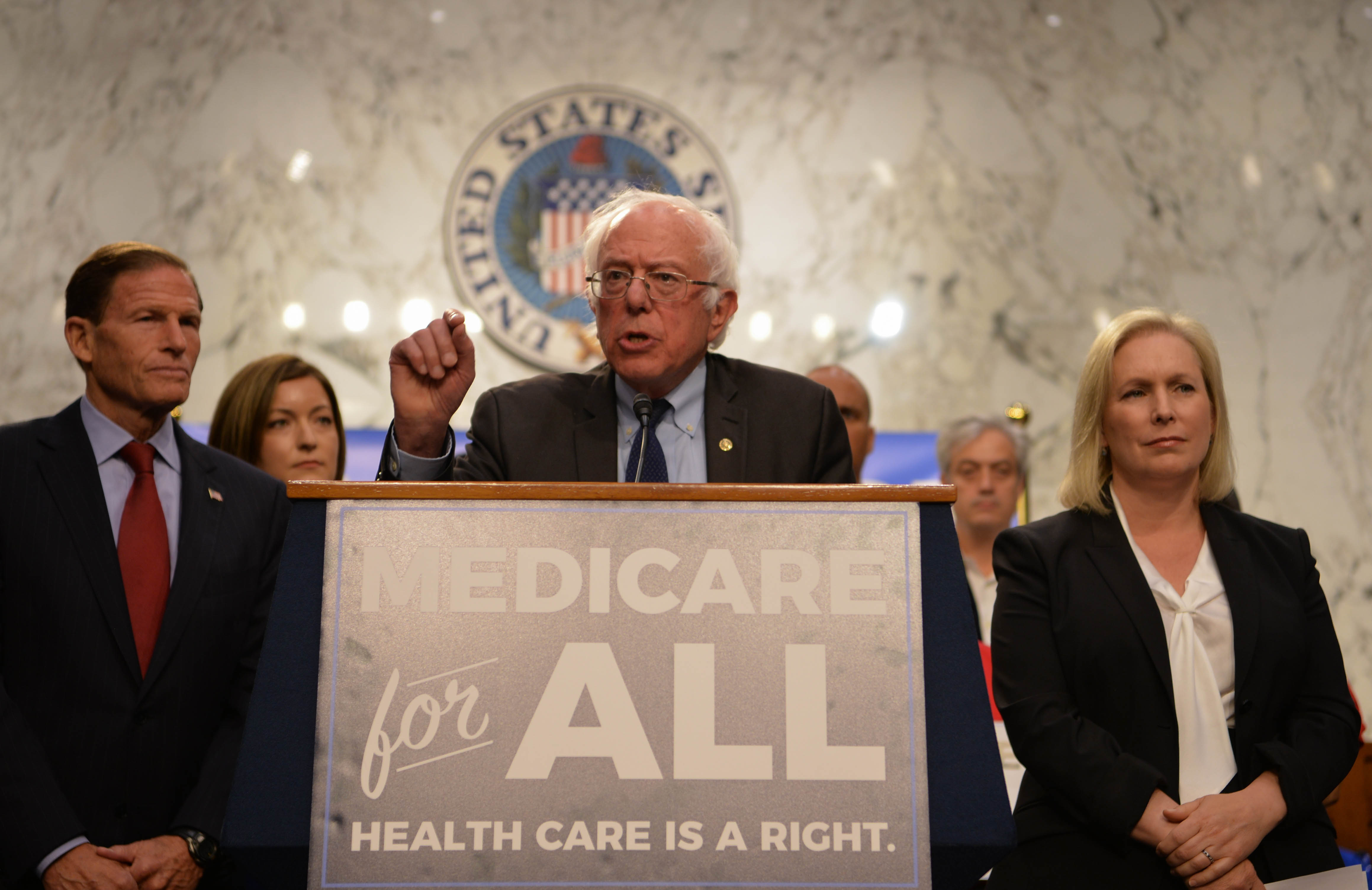
Sept. 13, 2017. Senator Bernie Sanders (I–VT) speaks in favor of Medicare for All. Senator Kirsten Gillibrand (D–NY) is standing to his left.

Proponents of a national health insurance program to replace for-profit health insurance argue adoption of a federally funded single-payer system allowing patients to choose their own doctor would reduce "structural racism" in health care that results in non-white Americans suffering higher mortality rates in underserved communities. Backers of single-payer or Medicare for All note that minorities and the poor, as well as rural residents, in general, are less able to afford private health insurance, and that those who can must pay high deductibles and co-payments that threaten families with financial ruin. In addition, they argue that those with employment-based insurance are tethered to jobs for fear of losing their medical coverage while rural communities with high unemployment lose out on job-based insurance benefits.

Critics of Medicare for All oppose a government funded health care system, wanting to preserve a for-profit model to increase competition, and assert that hospitals, already financially vulnerable in rural America, would lose more money and risk bankruptcy because private insurance, on which they rely for financial stability, reimburses at higher rates than Medicare. Proponents argue, however, that proposed single-payer legislation in the House and Senate would boost hospital reimbursements far beyond current levels, while establishing annual global hospital funds that could be increased to cover unexpected costs and grant applications for capital improvements. Supporters of single-payer point to the closure of over 100 rural hospitals since 2010, with over 400 also at risk of closure, as evidence of the failure of a for-profit health insurance system unaffordable to many rural residents and unsustainable for hospitals that rely on reimbursements from private insurance.

=== Public option to the Affordable Care Act (ACA) ===
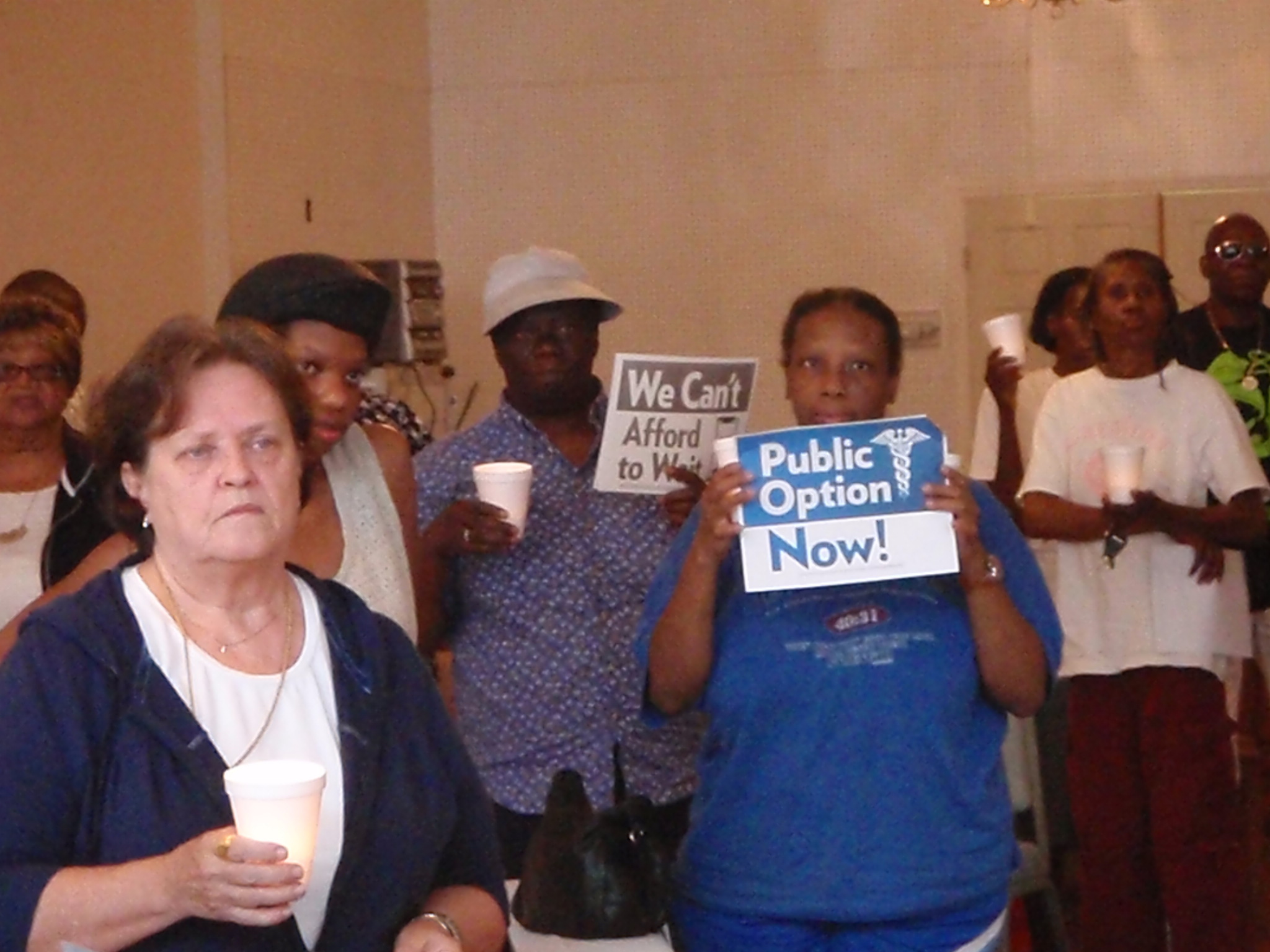
Supporters demand a Public Option be included in the Affordable Care Act.

Proponents of a public option support expanding the Affordable Care Act to give consumers a choice; private for-profit health insurance or Medicare. Backers of the public option say the ACA has not gone far enough, noting that despite the United States spending a greater percentage of its GDP on health care than any other nation, there are still over 28-million people without health insurance, resulting in Americans in underserved communities dying for lack of affordable care or declaring bankruptcy because of mounting medical bills.

While advocates of a public option agree with single-payer proponents that the United States should provide universal health care, they disagree on the solution, asserting that Americans are not interested in a government-run health care system and want to be able to keep their private health insurance. Critics who support single-payer instead charge that offering a public option to compete with private insurance would create a two-tiered system of concierge versus minimal medical services, as private for-profit insurance companies use political muscle to deny coverage to the oldest and sickest Americans, thus shunting the more expensive patients onto a financially vulnerable public option. Medicare for All proponents also say a hybrid system of private insurance coupled with a public option would result in added bureaucracy and paperwork, and therefore fail to lower health care costs.

Those favoring a strictly for-profit health care model claim a public option, with lower hospital reimbursements than private insurance, would bankrupt rural hospitals dependent on higher reimbursements from commercial insurance vendors.

=== Higher medical reimbursements and tax credits for rural hospitals ===
Seema Verma, Administrator of the Centers for Medicare & Medicaid Services (CMS), explains wage index disparities between urban and rural hospitals that led to underfunding rural hospitals will no longer strictly determine Medicare and Medicaid reimbursements. Under new policy rules, struggling rural hospitals may be eligible for higher Medicare reimbursements which, according to CMS, can be used to attract more highly skilled medical professionals. In addition, CMS will expand rural telehealth services under Medicare Advantage, a privatized insurance program, and relax supervision requirements for physician assistants and radiologist assistants.

On the state level, in 2016 Georgia established a $60 billion tax credit program to allow hospital donors to write off 100% of their donation to support a rural hospital. An investigation by the state's Department of Audits and Accounts found, however, the donations were not benefiting the rural hospitals that need the funds the most because too much money was deposited in the bank accounts of third party partners. Lawmakers have also complained that tax credits have benefited at least one rural hospital with a $60 million profit margin.

=== Free standing emergency centers (FECs) ===
In light of large numbers of hospital closures, particularly in rural America where the lack of emergency room services spawn health care deserts, proponents of 24-hour free standing emergency centers (FECs) advocate for more FECs that, unlike Urgent Care centers, would expand offerings beyond primary care to include:

- Advanced laboratory equipment (x-rays; CT scans)
- Emergency trained doctors and nurses
- Pre-arranged transfer for patients requiring hospitalization
- Prolonged 24-hour observation care

FECs can function as outpatient departments for existing hospitals or as independently owned entities. One obstacle to the establishment of additional independently run FECs is the inability to receive Medicare and Medicaid reimbursements afforded only to licensed hospitals. Some FECs have overcome this barrier by establishing licensed micro-hospitals with eight to ten inpatient beds in underserved regions. Another obstacle to growth of FECs in underserved areas is the preference of for-profit health systems to place FECs in dense urban communities that will attract more patients and generate more money while replacing hospital-based emergency services and primary care. Advocates of the FEC model for hard-pressed communities argue the federal government should expand the recognition of independent FECs as Medicare and Medicaid participants in underserved areas.

=== Telehealth ===
To address the rural health care crisis, advocates of telehealth promote the use of digital information and communication technology—cell phones and computers—that can be accessed from home or work without encumbering the patient with long travel times to hospitals at least 60 miles from their residence. Telehealth has emerged as a viable solution to address healthcare access gaps in medical deserts. By providing remote consultations, telehealth reduces the need for patients to travel long distances for medical care. Studies show that telehealth can be particularly effective in managing chronic conditions and improving mental health services in underserved areas. Proponents say telehealth or remote medical attention can provide patients in health care deserts with greater access to specialists unavailable in rural communities while encouraging patients to assume a greater role in managing their own health care and improving communication between them and their team of doctors. For example, with telehealth a diabetic patient might:

- Video conference with a doctor or other medical professional
- Download an app to estimate, based on diet and activity, the amount of insulin needed.
- Use a cell phone to upload food diaries and blood sugar levels for review by medical professionals
- Watch a video on carbohydrate counting to better control glucose levels
- Access an on-line patient portal to view test results, request pharmacy prescriptions, email a doctor or schedule an appointment
- Receive email reminders to obtain a flu shot or other preventative care

The Heritage Foundation, a think tank advocating limited government, advocates for removal of federal obstacles in order to classify telehealth as preventative care under high deductible insurance plans, provide reimbursements for telehealth visits equal to in-person doctor visits and permit doctors licensed in one state to practice telemedicine across state lines.

Critics of telehealth argue on-line doctor visits are no substitute for in-person evaluations which can provide a more accurate diagnosis and that uninsured rural Americans still won't be able to afford quality medical care. In addition, they argue large swaths of rural America may not have access to broadband internet necessary for successful implementation of telehealth. A survey conducted in 2019 found that people living in rural areas are twice as likely to not have access to the internet connection than urban counterparts. Additionally, lack of internet access was more prevalent among the elderly population and within racial and ethnic minority communities, which could contribute to the existing disparities in accessing care.

=== Incentives to recruit skilled medical professionals ===
The federal Office of Rural Health Policy oversees the non-profit National Rural Recruitment and Retention Network to connect medical professionals, hospitals and clinics in rural areas with recruitment and retention resources. The Network lists the following incentives rural legislative and medical entities could offer prospective doctors: health insurance, retirement packages, sabbaticals, sign-on bonuses, low-interest home loans. The Indian Health Service (IHS) offers prospective doctors up to $40,000 for repayment of student loans in exchange for a two-year commitment to serve American Indian and Alaska Native communities. Similarly, the National Health Service Corps (NHSC) offers up to $50,000 toward loan repayment if licensed health care providers agree to practice for two years in an underserved area. Under the federal NIMHD Loan Repayment Program (LRP) health professionals with doctoral degrees can receive up to $50,000 per year for two years to conduct research on health disparities.

== See also ==
- Health in the United States
- Healthcare in the United States
- Physician shortage in the United States
- Poverty in the United States
- Maternity care deserts in the United States
- Rural Health
