= Eric Redman (businessman) =

American lawyer and author (born 1948)

- Born: June 3, 1948 (age 78); Palo Alto, California, U.S.
- Occupations: Author, Lawyer, Climate Sector Professional

Eric Redman (born June 3, 1948, in Palo Alto, California) is an American author, lawyer, and climate sector professional residing in Seattle, Washington. Redman served as a legislative assistant to Senator Senator Warren G. Magnuson for two years around 1969–70. He is the author of The Dance of Legislation, a best-seller that chronicles the journey through Congress of the bill that established the National Health Service Corps. Initially published in 1973, with a second edition released in 2001, the book remains in print after more than fifty years and provides a Senate staff person's unique insight into the legislative process.

Redman's writings have appeared in notable publications, including The New York Times, The Washington Post, and Rolling Stone. His article on the climate effects of soot, "A Dirty Little Secret," appeared in the May–June 2005 issue of Legal Affairs.

Educationally, Redman's journey began at Phillips Academy, Andover (1963–66) and Harvard College (1966–1970), followed by a Rhodes Scholarship and master's degree at Oxford University (1970–1972), culminating in a J.D. degree from Harvard Law School in 1975. His professional career took a significant turn in 1983 when he joined Heller Ehrman LLP and established the firm's Energy Practice Group.

After more than three decades specializing in public policy and energy law, Redman transitioned from legal practice to focusing on sustainable energy solutions. He led Summit Power Group Inc. as its president and CEO from 2008 to October 2014, a company known for its work on wind, solar, gas-fired, and carbon-capture power projects, including the Texas Clean Energy Project. Currently, Redman holds positions on the Global Carbon Capture & Storage Institute board, and contributes as a Senior Policy Fellow to the Deep Decarbonization Initiative at the University of California San Diego's graduate School of Global Policy & Strategy.

In a recent venture, Redman joined Aether Fuels Inc. as vice president following its acquisition of Sustainable Syngas LLC, a company he founded. His advisory roles extend to Hydrostor and Cvictus Inc., reflecting his commitment to energy innovation for climate and environmental sustainability. Additionally, he serves on the Northwest African American Museum board, demonstrating his engagement with cultural and community affairs.

Redman has also ventured into detective fiction, with his debut murder mystery, Bones of Hilo, being chosen as one of five finalists for the International Thriller Writers Award for Best First Novel. A sequel, Death in Hilo, continues the adventures of half-Hawaiian police detective Kawika Wong, intertwining homicide investigations with the rich cultural and geographical tapestry of Hawaiʻi.

== Published Works ==
- The Dance of Legislation (1973, 2001)
- Bones of Hilo (2021)
- Death in Hilo (2024)
