= Physician shortage in the United States =

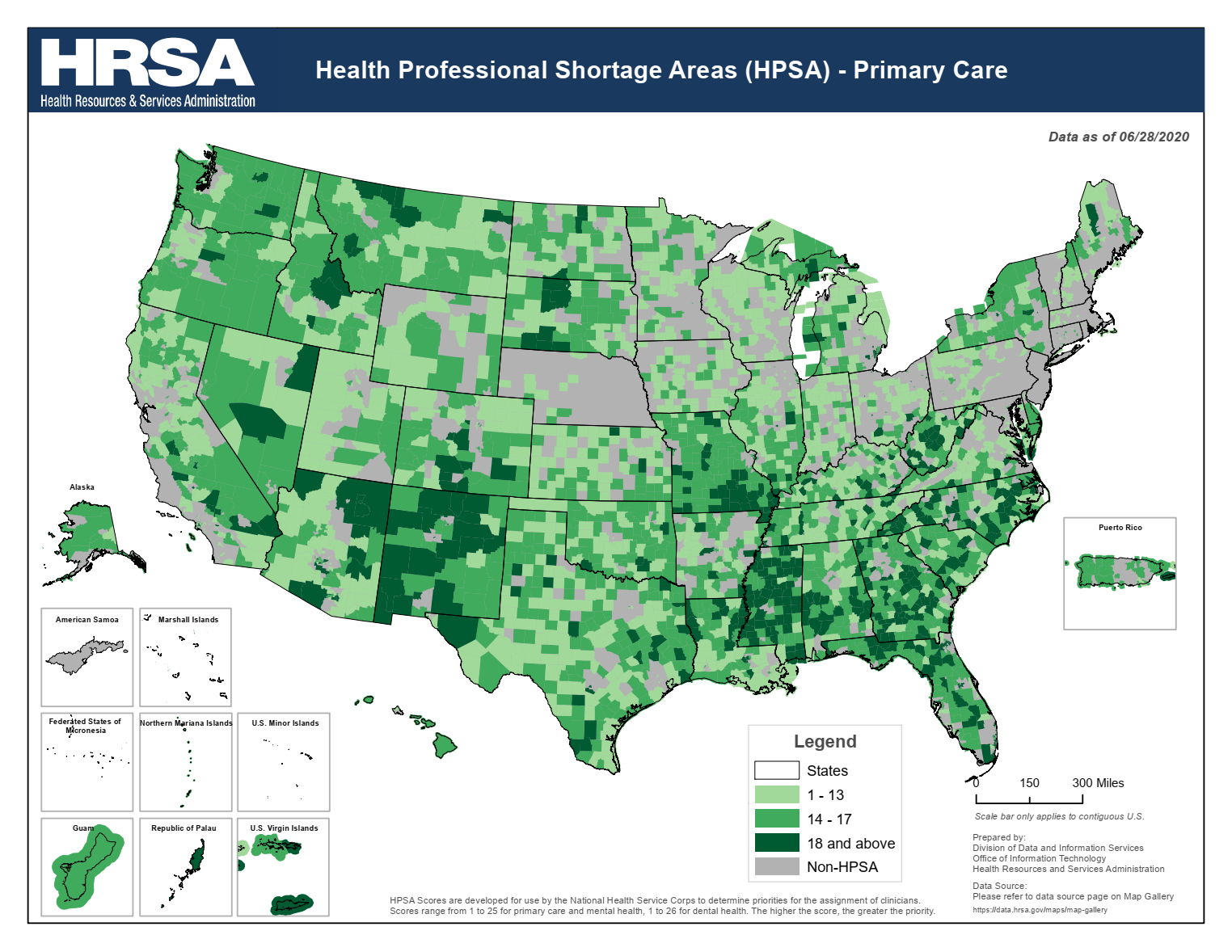
These measurements of healthcare service levels for specific areas of the U.S. came out in June 2020 through the Health Resources and Services Administration (HRSA), an agency of the Department of Health and Human Services (HHS)

Concerns of both a current and future shortage of medical doctors due to the supply and demand for physicians in the United States have come from multiple entities including professional bodies such as the American Medical Association (AMA). The AMA itself has been criticized for creating the shortage in the first place.

The subject has been analyzed as well by the American news media in publications such as Forbes, The Nation, and Newsweek. In 2023, the Association of American Medical Colleges predicted "a shortage of physicians by 2036 between 13,500 and 86,000", as well as showing a current shortage of primary care physicians and surgical specialty physicians.

Healthcare in America itself may deteriorate for certain communities inside particular U.S. states due to such trends, particularly in terms of the lack of access to specialty services in rural locations. For instance, a September 2022 report from the University of Hawaiʻi System found that the collection of islands faces "a severe physician shortage". A piece published that same month by Spectrum News 1 - Ohio described the Midwestern state as featuring a shortage "that's expected to hit rural areas the hardest." Mechanisms of structural inequality in the U.S. affect its national health due to past and current discrimination, particularly efforts to set people apart based on Americans' racial identities.

In the broader context of evaluating peoples' health across the whole planet, worries over a doctor shortage have occurred in multiple countries besides the U.S. For instance, the World Health Organization estimates a "projected shortfall of 11 million healthcare workers by 2030".

== Background and trends ==
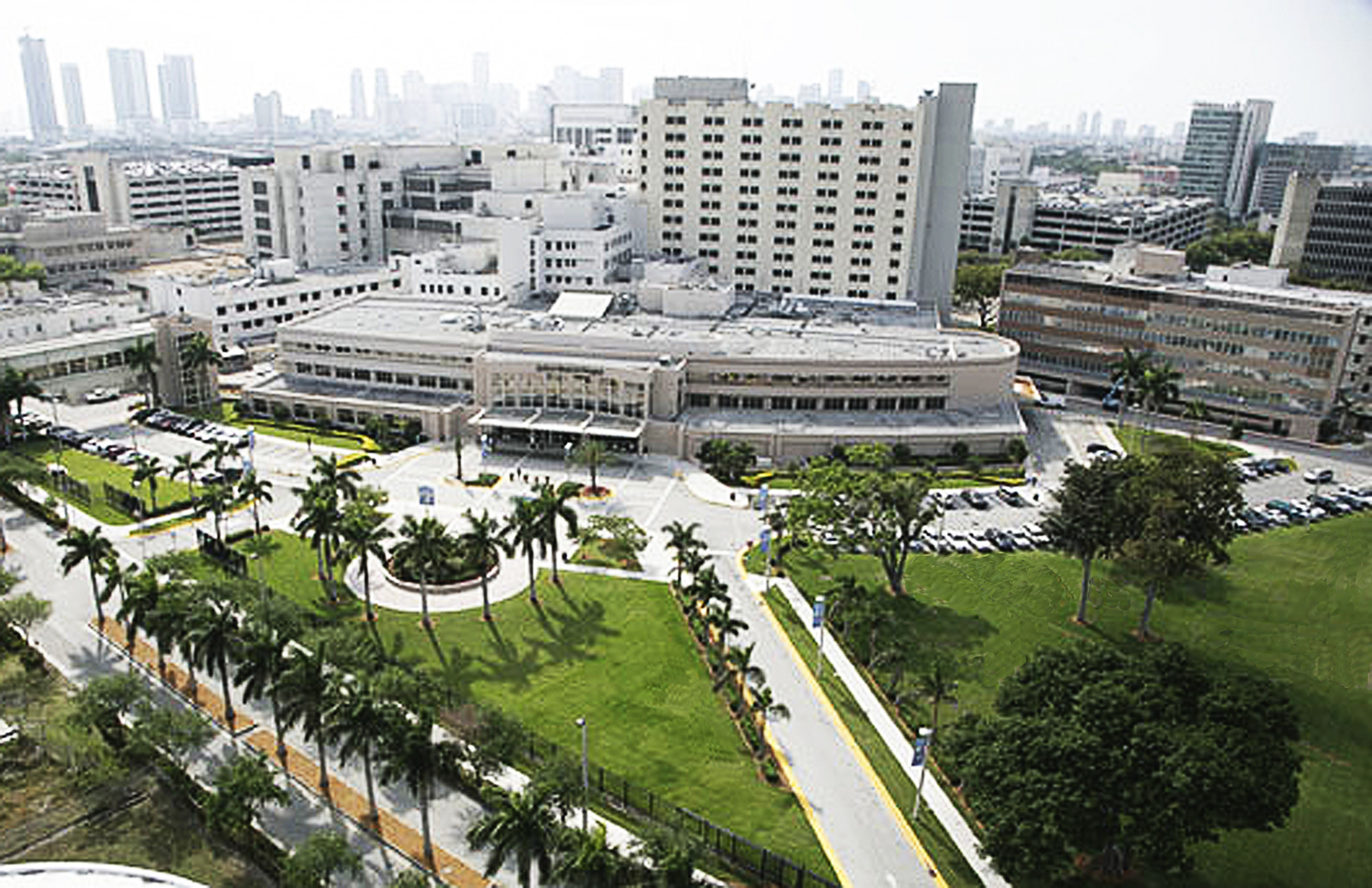
The Jackson Memorial Hospital (MJMH) complex in Miami, which serves as the primary teaching hospital for the Miller School of Medicine at the University of Miami

On September 30, 1980, the Graduate Medical Education National Advisory Committee (GMENAC) sent a statement titled "Summary Report of The Graduate Medical Education National Advisory Committee" to the Secretary of the Department of Health and Human Services (Patricia Roberts Harris at the time), which "estimates a surplus of 70,000 physicians by 1990".

This led to an eventual nationwide voluntary medical school moratorium that would last from 1980 to 2005, intended to prevent a surplus of physicians in the U.S. The moratorium called for the halt of the creation of new medical schools and a reduction or freeze of medical school enrollment. The moratorium was successful, as the number of M.D. annual entrants never surpasses 16,660 (1981) nor did it fall below 15,800 (1989). Additionally, only three new M.D. schools were established during the moratorium.

In February 2010, the news-magazine Newsweek published in a report that the "annual number of American medical students who go into primary care has dropped by more than half since 1997" to the point where it had gotten "hard to get an appointment with the doctors who remain". The journal also commented that "as many as half of primary-care providers have stopped taking new patients." In addition, a 2010s study released by the Association of American Medical Colleges (AAMC) titled The Complexities of Physician Supply and Demand: Projections From 2019 to 2034 specifically projected a shortage of between 37,800 and 124,000 individuals within the following two decades, approximately.

Known for serving as president of the American Academy of Family Physicians (AAFP), Sterling Ransone Jr., M.D., has commented that the demographics of medical professionals in the U.S. will generate noticeable effects as time passes. "By 2032, the U.S. population's going to grow by about 10%, but those of us who are age 65 or older, we’re going to grow by about 47%," he has remarked, adding that by "that same year... probably about one-third of active physicians are going to be over age 65, so our physicians— we’re aging as well". Dr. Ransone has highlighted his specific discipline of family medicine as already affected by these difficulties.

The American Medical Association (AMA), a professional body in the U.S., has cited increasing costs of higher education in the country as a barrier to adequate growth in physician supply. In a 2022 article, the organization stated that "[m]edical school graduates typically finish school with about $200,000 in medical student-loan debt, which is often seen as an influential factor in specialty choice." The discussion of anticipated financial burdens from schooling itself can also result in a self-fulfilling prophecy.

Healthcare in America itself may deteriorate for certain communities due to the shortage of medical professionals; the potential harm caused by the lack of access to specialty services in rural locations has garnered specific attention. The AMA has reported shortages already causing stress among U.S. patients. In December 2021, an article from the financial publication Forbes argued that the "lack of funding for residency slots to expand the pool of physicians in the U.S. has been an issue for more than two decades."

When evaluating specific states inside of the U.S., a September 2022 report from the University of Hawaiʻi System reported that the collection of islands "has a severe physician shortage" to the point that "statistics show the deficit is at least 750 full-time providers, with primary care specialties... [having] the greatest need." A piece published that same month by Spectrum News 1 - Ohio relayed that the Midwestern state features a shortage "that's expected to hit rural areas the hardest." The article noted that the Northeast Ohio Medical University "estimates there are 11.7 physicians per a population of 10,000 in the Buckeye state compared to 38.9 physicians for that same population in a metropolitan area." In a report from the National Center of Health Workforce Analysis, the states with the lowest number of practicing patient care physicians are Mississippi, Oklahoma, and Idaho.

The coronavirus (COVID-19) pandemic had drastically affected the physician shortage worldwide. A survey by the Mayo Clinic observed "the physicians' satisfaction with work-life balance and professional fulfillment declined during the COVID-19 pandemic". The pandemic had emphasized a decrease in the number of physicians across the United States due to the negative influence on rural areas.

== Influence of history and effects from discrimination ==
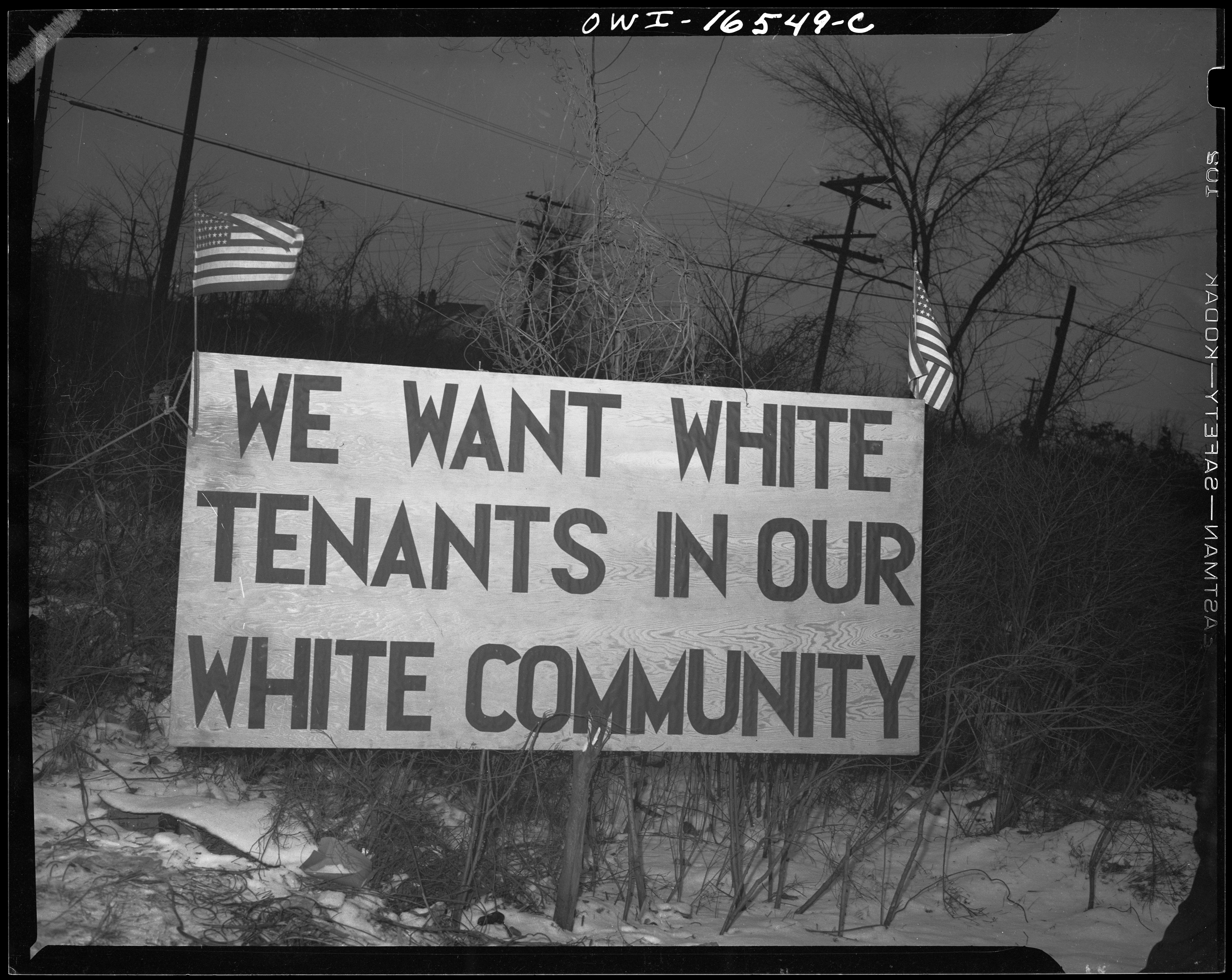
Racial segregation in the U.S., expressed by activists such as those in Detroit, Michigan who erected signs such as these, has significantly affected the distribution of healthcare services for decades. Photograph by Arthur Siegel.

Mechanisms of structural inequality in the U.S. affect its national health due to past and current discrimination, particularly efforts to set people apart based on Americans' racial identities. The academic journal Health Services Research published a 2012 study by Darrell J. Gaskin, Ph.D. and a team of other analysts that reported how "[r]acial and ethnic disparities in primary care are well documented" given that "[d]isparities in health care may be caused by higher proportions of minorities living in 'medical deserts,' that is, communities with limited health care resources." In short, their "findings indicate that residential segregation matters" as "African[-]American segregation was negatively associated with the availability of physician services." As the U.S. doctor shortage worsens the natures of these 'deserts', in their view, the analysts advised policymakers to focus on "[e]xpanding community health centers and [also] subsidies programs for physicians to serve in underserved areas".

American scholars have theorized more broadly that, as detailed in the aforementioned Health Services Research report, aspects of cultural status such as "money, power, prestige, and social connectedness" influence medicine across the country. Thus, "those with the most access and control over resources are in a better position to avoid risks, diseases, and the consequences of disease."

== Issues and proposed actions ==
Socio-political news-magazine The Nation has argued in an article that a market-oriented system in the U.S., with its "fee-for-service framework", "remains embedded in American health care and endures as its dominant underlying driver" in a way that "places value on specialized services rather than on primary care". Thus, the whole framework serves as "a crucial factor behind the worsening shortage of primary-care doctors", according to the publication. Specifically, The Nation has asserted that the financial methodology "compensates doctors, clinics, and hospitals based upon number and type of visits involved in a patient's care, creating incentives for unnecessary procedures, excessive clinic appointments, and the mountains of paperwork that have become the bane of American doctors’ daily lives."

Analyzing the possibility of expanded immigration to America to enhance the nation's workface, a piece from the general interest news-magazine Newsweek has reported,

"There's one more group of people, foreign medical graduates, who could theoretically fill in for the missing primary-care providers. The trouble is, they're already doing that. More than a quarter of primary-care doctors currently practicing in the United States have gotten their diplomas abroad. Increasing their numbers would be problematic for both the left (which might object to poaching doctors from developing countries that need them) and the right (which would surely object to recruiting non-Americans to do a job that reliably pulls in six figures, especially when unemployment is high)."

Several states have dropped the residency requirement for international medical graduate to acquire medical licenses in the US to practice to address physician shortages, particularly in rural areas. This, however, does not remove all barriers foreign trained doctors face in order to practice in the US. Given how critical international medical graduates are to the US physician workforce, the second Trump administration's anti-immigration policies particularly with fee increases of H1-B visas could exacerbate the shortage.

A study by the Niskanen Center, a think tank based out of Washington, D.C., has found that the U.S. federal government's administrative processes within Medicare and other programs make the doctor shortage worse. "Medicare's residency funding was designed around the naïve assumption that private insurers would contribute their fair share to training" such that "funding is based solely on the number of Medicare patients a hospital sees", according to Niskanen analyst Robert Orr, with a structure coming about that "shortchanges geographic locations and facilities with fewer elderly patients". This still occurs, in Orr's analysis, "while separate programs exist to deliver funds to children's hospitals and rural clinics, [since] Medicare dwarfs them."

Proposed efforts to change the viewpoints of medical students have received academic study. For example, an analysis explored in a Society of Teachers of Family Medicine (STFM) conference held in 2010 inside Jacksonville, Florida received wider distribution afterwards, with Dr. Julie Phillips of the Michigan State University College of Human Medicine (MSUCHM) and other scholars detailing what a 2006 to 2008 survey of approximately a thousand students at three different schools found. The experts observed broadly that "contemporary physicians struggle to meet the high expectations set by patients and their profession with limited time and resources." Specifically, results indicated that only 145 survey respondents (14.8%) leaned towards having a career in primary care. Furthermore, 11.2% of first-year students expressed interest in that medical focus in contrast to how 10.8% of second-year students showed interest. In addition, third-year and fourth-year students expressed more interest in having a career in primary care, at 18.3% and 21.0%, respectively.

In the same study, those senior students rejected the widespread stereotypes about primary care. They did not believe that time constraints in medicine, such as short appointments, lead to poor doctor-patient relationships, which was most likely due to their increased first-hand experience with patients and doctors. Experts hypothesize that more student exposure to the life of physicians via shadowing may prevent prejudices and false assumptions about primary care. This study points out that junior and senior medical students are aware of the drawbacks associated with primary care, such as the relatively low salary, but what is more important to them is their interest in a particular specialty. These students relied less on the known perception of primary care and more on their own personal value that they attached to it. The more exposure that medical students have to primary care, the more likely they are to become interested in it as an invaluable gateway to medical treatment. This data suggests that the combination of earlier introduction to primary care and an emphasis on its value would propel medical students to choose a career in preventative care. Such proposals, however, would require the participation of numerous stakeholders.

Increasing medical students’ experience in primary care relies on the participation of stakeholders, including medical schools. They can create initiatives that may include increasing the number of internships revolving around primary care. From a financial perspective, the "median debt was $200,000 in 2019", but medical schools can alleviate their cost through fellowships, scholarships, or grants. Offering opportunities to become involved in this specialty, while providing financial support, would address two problems of recruiting primary care physicians: it would provide students with more ways to experience what it is like to specialize in preventative care; and it would allow students to take advantage of the opportunities offered by the school, instead of focusing on the financial aspect of medical school.

An increasing number of physician assistants (PAs) and nurse practitioners (NPs) can help with the stress the current physicians face. The Association of American Medical Colleges report that the number of PAs and NPs are "projected to increase by 66% and 37%, respectively, between 2024 and 2034". These health professionals can encourage expanded healthcare to the rural populations within the United States.

== See also ==
- Health policy
- Health workforce
- Healthcare in the United States
- Medical deserts in the United States
- Medical education in the United States
- Physician shortage
- Physicians in the United States
- Primary care service area
