= Combined internal medicine and psychiatry residency =

A combined internal medicine and psychiatry residency program is a post-graduate medical education program in the United States, which leads to board eligibility in both internal medicine and psychiatry. That is, a graduate of the residency is both an internist as well as a psychiatrist. The program takes five years of post-graduate medical training. There are 12 such programs in the country, and around eighteen positions available for new applicants.

Graduates of such programs can follow a variety of career paths as Dual Internist/Psychiatrists.

- Integrated Med-Psych Practice: Providing both medical and psychiatric care concurrently to patients.
- Working with subspecialties of psychiatry that require or are enhanced by an in-depth understanding of internal medicine:
  - Consultation Psychiatry/Psychosomatic medicine: treating the psychiatric problems of medically ill patients that are being cared for by other medical practitioners
  - Geriatric psychiatry: Elderly patients often have multiple medical problems that make them more susceptible to side effects of medicines and may play a role in the development of their psychiatric symptoms.
  - Chronic pain management: Patients with chronic pain frequently have depression and other psychiatric syndromes that make their pain worse and harder to treat. Also several psychological therapies have been found to be effective for most patients with chronic pain.
  - Substance and alcohol use: There are significant physical and psychological components to addiction that are amendable to an integrated approach of evaluation and treatment.
- Working in a subspecialty of Internal Medicine that requires or is enhanced by an in-depth knowledge of psychiatry:
  - Hematology-Oncology: Treating cancer and the related mental health issues
  - HIV care
  - Pain management: see above
  - Geriatric care
