= List of Gold Humanism Honor Society chapters =

The Gold Humanism Honor Society is an American honor society that recognizes senior medical students, residents, and physician teachers for excellence in clinical care, compassion, and dedication to humanism in service. It was created by the Arnold P. Gold Foundation for Humanism in Medicine in 2002.

== Undergraduate chapters ==
Following are the Gold Honor Society's undergraduate chapters.

Charter date	Institution	Location	State or province	Status	Ref.
2002	Roy J. and Lucille A. Carver College of Medicine	Iowa City, Iowa	IA	Active	
2002	Robert Wood Johnson Medical School	New Brunswick, New Jersey	NJ	Active	
2003	Chicago Medical School	North Chicago, Illinois	IL	Active	
2003	Penn State University College of Medicine	Hershey, Pennsylvania	PA	Active	
2003	New Jersey Medical School	Newark, New Jersey	NJ	Active	
2003	Tulane University School of Medicine	New Orleans, Louisiana	LA	Active	
2003	University of Florida College of Medicine	Gainesville, Florida	FL	Active	
2003	University of Virginia School of Medicine	Charlottesville, Virginia	VA	Active	
2003	Columbia University College of Physicians and Surgeons	Manhattan, New York	NY	Active	
2004	Boonshoft School of Medicine	Dayton, Ohio	OH	Active	
2004	Creighton University School of Medicine	Omaha, Nebraska	NE	Active	
2004	Icahn School of Medicine at Mount Sinai	New York City, New York	NY	Active	
2004	Jacobs School of Medicine and Biomedical Sciences	Buffalo, New York	NY	Active	
2004	Long School of Medicine	San Antonio, Texas	TX	Active	
2004	Michigan State University College of Human Medicine	East Lansing, Michigan	MI	Active	
2004	University of South Florida College of Medicine	Tampa, Florida	FL	Active	
2004	Renaissance School of Medicine at Stony Brook University	Stony Brook, New York	NY	Active	
2004	Rowan-Virtua School of Osteopathic Medicine	Stratford, New Jersey	NJ	Active	
2004	St. George’s University School of Medicine	St. George's, Grenada		Active	
2004	Texas A&M School of Medicine	Bryan, Texas	TX	Active	
2004	Ohio State University College of Medicine	Columbus, Ohio	OH	Active	
2004	UC Irvine School of Medicine	Irvine, California	CA	Active	
2004	UC San Diego School of Medicine	San Diego, California	CA	Active	
2004	Pritzker School of Medicine	Chicago, Illinois	IL	Active	
2004	University of Illinois College of Medicine at Chicago	Chicago, Illinois	IL	Active	
2004	University of Minnesota Medical School	Minneapolis, Minnesota	MN	Active	
2004	University of Mississippi Medical Center School of Medicine	Jackson, Mississippi	MS	Active	
2004	University of Missouri–Kansas City School of Medicine	Kansas City, Missouri	MO	Active	
2004	University of Pittsburgh School of Medicine	Pittsburgh, Pennsylvania	PA	Active	
2004	University of Rochester School of Medicine and Dentistry	Rochester, New York	NY	Active	
2004	Wake Forest School of Medicine	Winston-Salem, North Carolina	NC	Active	
2005	Geisel School of Medicine	Hanover, New Hampshire	NH	Active	
2005	Indiana University School of Medicine	Indianapolis, Indiana	IN	Active	
2005	Robert Larner College of Medicine	Burlington, Vermont	VT	Active	
2005	Medical University of South Carolina	Charleston, South Carolina	SC	Active	
2005	Mercer University School of Medicine	Macon, Georgia	GA	Active	
2005	East Tennessee State University James H. Quillen College of Medicine	Johnson City, Tennessee	TN	Active	
2005	Rush Medical College	Chicago, Illinois	IL	Active	
2005	State University of New York Upstate Medical University	Syracuse, New York	NY	Active	
2005	University of Illinois College of Medicine at Rockford	Rockford, Illinois	IL	Active	
2005	University of Kansas School of Medicine	Kansas City, Kansas	KS	Active	
2005	University of Nevada, Reno School of Medicine	Reno, Nevada	NV	Active	
2005	University of Oklahoma College of Medicine	Oklahoma City, Oklahoma	OK	Active	
2005	University of Texas Medical Branch	Galveston, Texas	TX	Active	
2005	University of Toledo College of Medicine and Life Sciences	Toledo, Ohio	OH	Active	
2005	Wayne State University School of Medicine	Detroit, Michigan	MI	Active	
2006	Albany Medical College	Albany, New York	NY	Active	
2006	Boston University School of Medicine	Boston, Massachusetts	MA	Active	
2006	Memorial University of Newfoundland Faculty of Medicine	St. John's, Newfoundland and Labrador, Canada	NL	Active	
2006	Florida State University College of Medicine	Tallahassee, Florida	FL	Active	
2006	University of South Dakota Sanford School of Medicine	Vermillion, South Dakota	SD	Active	
2006	Texas Tech University Health Sciences Center School of Medicine	Lubbock, Texas	TX	Active	
2006	University of Alabama at Birmingham School of Medicine	Birmingham, Alabama	AL	Active	
2006	University of Kentucky College of Medicine	Lexington, Kentucky	KY	Active	
2006	University of South Alabama Frederick P. Whiddon College of Medicine	Mobile, Alabama	AL	Active	
2006	University of Wisconsin School of Medicine and Public Health	Madison, Wisconsin	WI	Active	
2007	Baylor College of Medicine	Houston, Texas	TX	Active	
2007	Des Moines University College of Osteopathic Medicine	West Des Moines, Iowa	IA	Active	
2007	New York Medical College	Valhalla, New York	NY	Active	
2007	SUNY Downstate Health Sciences University	New York City, New York	NY	Active	
2007	Texas Tech University Health Sciences Center School of Medicine	Lubbock, Texas	TX	Active	
2007	University of Arizona College of Medicine – Tucson	Tucson, Arizona	AZ	Active	
2007	University of Cincinnati College of Medicine	Cincinnati, Ohio	OH	Active	
2007	University of Illinois College of Medicine at Peoria	Peoria, Illinois	IL	Active	
2007	University of Maryland School of Medicine	Baltimore, Maryland	MD	Active	
2008	Chicago College of Osteopathic Medicine	Downers Grove, Illinois	IL	Active	
2008	Saint Louis University School of Medicine	St. Louis, Missouri	MO	Active	
2008	University of Puerto Rico School of Medicine	San Juan, Puerto Rico	PR	Active	
2008	Alpert Medical School	Providence, Rhode Island	RI	Active	
December 15, 2008	West Virginia University School of Medicine	Morgantown, West Virginia	WV	Active	
2009	Nova Southeastern College of Osteopathic Medicine	Davie, Florida	FL	Active	
2009	Howard University College of Medicine	Washington, D.C.	DC	Active	
2009	Sidney Kimmel Medical College	Philadelphia, Pennsylvania	PA	Active	
2009	Stanford University School of Medicine	Stanford, California	CA	Active	
2009	Touro University California College of Osteopathic Medicine	Vallejo, California	CA	Active	
2009	University of Colorado School of Medicine	Aurora, Colorado	CO	Active	
2009	University of Connecticut School of Medicine	Farmington, Connecticut	CT	Active	
2009	University of Louisville School of Medicine	Louisville, Kentucky	KY	Active	
2009	University of New Mexico School of Medicine	Albuquerque, New Mexico	NM	Active	
2009	University of North Dakota School of Medicine and Health Sciences	Grand Forks, North Dakota	ND	Active	
March 2009	University of Tennessee Health Science Center	Memphis, Tennessee	TN	Active	
2010	Albert Einstein College of Medicine	New York City, New York	NY	Active	
2010	Temple University School of Medicine	Philadelphia, Pennsylvania	PA	Active	
2010	Medical College of Georgia	Augusta, Georgia	GA	Active	
2010	Meharry Medical College	Nashville, Tennessee	TN	Active	
2010	Oregon Health & Science University School of Medicine	Portland, Oregon	OR	Active	
2010	University of Arizona College of Medicine – Phoenix	Phoenix, Arizona	AZ	Active	
2010	UC Davis School of Medicine	Davis, California	CA	Active	
2011	ECU Brody School of Medicine	Greenville, North Carolina	NC	Active	
2011	Eastern Virginia Medical School	Norfolk, Virginia	VA	Active	
2011	UNC School of Medicine	Chapel Hill, North Carolina	NC	Active	
2012	A.T. Still University	Kirksville, Missouri	MO	Active	
2012	Geisinger Commonwealth School of Medicine	Scranton, Pennsylvania	PA	Active	
2012	Georgetown University School of Medicine	Washington, D.C.	DC	Active	
2012	Joan C. Edwards School of Medicine	Huntington, West Virginia	WV	Active	
2012	John A. Burns School of Medicine	Honolulu, Hawaii	HI	Active	
2012	Perelman School of Medicine	Philadelphia, Pennsylvania	PA	Active	
2012	Paul L. Foster School of Medicine	El Paso, Texas	TX	Active	
2012	University of Washington School of Medicine	Seattle, Washington	WA	Active	
2013	Charles E. Schmidt College of Medicine	Boca Raton, Florida	FL	Active	
2013	FIU Herbert Wertheim College of Medicine	Miami, Florida	FL	Active	
2013	LSU Health Sciences Center New Orleans	New Orleans, Louisiana	LA	Active	
2013	Medical College of Wisconsin	Milwaukee, Wisconsin	WI	Active	
2013	Virginia Tech Carilion School of Medicine	Roanoke, Virginia	VA	Active	
2013	Washington University School of Medicine	St. Louis, Missouri	MO	Active	
2014	A.T. Still University School of Osteopathic Medicine in Arizona	Mesa, Arizona	AZ	Active	
2014	David Geffen School of Medicine at UCLA	Los Angeles, California	CA	Active	
2014	Zucker School of Medicine	Hempstead, New York	NY	Active	
2014	Tom and Julie Wood College of Osteopathic Medicine	Indianapolis, Indiana	IN	Active	
2014	UMass Chan Medical School	Worcester, Massachusetts	MA	Active	
2014	Miller School of Medicine	Miami, Florida	FL	Active	
2014	University of Nebraska Medical Center	Omaha, Nebraska	NE	Active	
2014	University of New England College of Osteopathic Medicine	Biddeford, Maine	ME	Active	
2015	Central Michigan University College of Medicine	Mount Pleasant, Michigan	MI	Active	
2015	Cooper Medical School of Rowan University	Camden, New Jersey	NJ	Active	
2015	Drexel University College of Medicine	Philadelphia, Pennsylvania	PA	Active	
2015	Kansas City University College of Osteopathic Medicine	Kansas City, Missouri	MO	Active	
2015	New York Institute of Technology College of Osteopathic Medicine	Old Westbury, New York	NY	Active	
2015	New York University Grossman School of Medicine	New York City, New York	NY	Active	
2015	Heritage College of Osteopathic Medicine	Athens, Ohio	OH	Active	
2015	San Juan Bautista School of Medicine	Caguas, Puerto Rico	PR	Active	
2015	University of Utah School of Medicine	Salt Lake City, Utah	UT	Active	
2015	Uniformed Services University of the Health Sciences	Bethesda, Maryland	MD	Active	
2015	University of Central Florida College of Medicine	Orlando, Florida	FL	Active	
2015	University of Missouri School of Medicine	Columbia, Missouri	MO	Active	
2015	University of South Carolina School of Medicine, Columbia	Columbia, South Carolina	SC	Active	
2015	University of South Carolina School of Medicine, Greenville	Greenville, South Carolina	SC	Active	
2015	University of Texas Southwestern Medical Center	Dallas, Texas	TX	Active	
2015	Vanderbilt University School of Medicine	Nashville, Tennessee	TN	Active	
2015	VCU School of Medicine	Richmond, Virginia	VA	Active	
2015	College of Osteopathic Medicine of the Pacific	Pomona, California	CA	Active	
2015	College of Osteopathic Medicine of the Pacific, Northwest	Lebanon, Oregon	OR	Active	
2016	Feinberg School of Medicine	Chicago, Illinois	IL	Active	
2016	Keck School of Medicine of USC	Los Angeles, California	CA	Active	
2016	DeBusk College of Osteopathic Medicine	Harrogate, Tennessee	TN	Active	
2016	LSU Health Sciences Center Shreveport	Shreveport, Louisiana	LA	Active	
2016	McGovern Medical School	Houston, Texas	TX	Active	
2016	Oakland University William Beaumont School of Medicine	Rochester, Michigan	MI	Active	
2016	Touro College of Osteopathic Medicine, Middletown	Middletown, New York	NY	Active	
2016	University of Michigan Medicine	Ann Arbor, Michigan	MI	Active	
2016	William Carey University College of Osteopathic Medicine	Hattiesburg, Mississippi	MS	Active	
2017	Mayo Clinic Alix School of Medicine	Rochester, Minnesota	MN	Active	
2017	Pacific Northwest University of Health Sciences College of Osteopathic Medicine	Yakima, Washington	WA	Active	
2017	Philadelphia College of Osteopathic Medicine	Philadelphia, Pennsylvania	PA	Active	
2017	Ponce Health Sciences University Medical Education Program	Ponce, Puerto Rico	PR	Active	
2017	Rocky Vista University College of Osteopathic Medicine	Englewood, Colorado	CO	Active	
2017	Texas College of Osteopathic Medicine	Fort Worth, Texas	TX	Active	
2018	Alabama College of Osteopathic Medicine	Dothan, Alabama	AL	Active	
2018	Edward Via College of Osteopathic Medicine - Auburn Campus	Auburn, Alabama	AL	Active	
2018	Edward Via College of Osteopathic Medicine - Carolinas Campus	Spartanburg, South Carolina	SC	Active	
2018	Edward Via College of Osteopathic Medicine - Virginia Campus	Blacksburg, Virginia	VA	Active	
2018	Frank H. Netter MD School of Medicine at Quinnipiac University	North Haven, Connecticut	CT	Active	
2018	Universidad Central del Caribe School of Medicine	Bayamón, Puerto Rico	PR	Active	
2018	UC Riverside School of Medicine	Riverside, California	CA	Active	
2018	University of Pikeville Kentucky College of Osteopathic Medicine	Pikeville, Kentucky	KY	Active	
2018	Western Michigan University Homer Stryker M.D. School of Medicine	Kalamazoo, Michigan	MI	Active	
2019	American University of Beirut	Beirut, Lebanon		Active	
2019	Stritch School of Medicine	Chicago, Illinois	IL	Active	
2019	University of Queensland Ochsner Clinical School	Brisbane, Queensland, Australia	QLD	Active	
2019	Philadelphia College of Osteopathic Medicine Georgia Campus	Moultrie, Georgia	GA	Active	
2019	Tel Aviv University Faculty of Medical and Health Sciences	Tel Aviv, Israel		Active	
2019	Touro College of Osteopathic Medicine -Harlem	Harlem, New York City, New York	NY	Active	
2020	Burrell College of Osteopathic Medicine	Las Cruces, New Mexico	NM	Active	
2020	Dell Medical School	Austin, Texas	TX	Active	
2020	Kansas City University, Joplin	Joplin, Missouri	MO	Active	
2020	Loma Linda University School of Medicine	Loma Linda, California	CA	Active	
2020	Southern Illinois University School of Medicine	Springfield, Illinois	IL	Active	
2021	Arkansas College of Osteopathic Medicine	Fort Smith, Arkansas	AR	Active	
2021	Elson S. Floyd College of Medicine	Spokane, Washington	WA	Active	
2021	UNLV School of Medicine	Las Vegas, Nevada	NV	Active	
2021	New York Institute of Technology College of Osteopathic Medicine	Old Westbury, New York	NY	Active	
2021	Rocky Vista University	Ivins, Utah	UT	Active	
2021	Weill Cornell Medicine	New York City, New York	NY	Active	
2022	Johns Hopkins School of Medicine	Baltimore, Maryland	MD	Active	
2022	Oklahoma State University College of Osteopathic Medicine	Tahlequah, Oklahoma	OK	Active	
2022	Philadelphia College of Osteopathic Medicine	Suwanee, Georgia	GA	Active	
2022	Royal College of Surgeons in Ireland	Dublin, Leinster, Ireland	IE-L	Active	
2022	University College Dublin	Dublin, Leinster, Ireland	IE-L	Active	
2023	Burnett School of Medicine	Fort Worth, Texas	TX	Active	
2023	Dr Kiran C. Patel College of Allopathic Medicine	Davie, Florida	FL	Active	
2023	Hackensack Meridian School of Medicine	Nutley, New Jersey	NJ	Active	
2023	Idaho College of Osteopathic Medicine	Meridian, Idaho	ID	Active	
2023	University of the Incarnate Word School of Osteopathic Medicine	San Antonio, Texas	TX	Active	
2023	West Virginia School of Osteopathic Medicine	Lewisburg, West Virginia	WV	Active	
2024	CUNY School of Medicine	New York City, New York	NY	Active	
2024	Edward Via College of Osteopathic Medicine	Monroe, Louisiana	LA	Active	
2024	Lake Erie College of Osteopathic Medicine	Bradenton, Florida	FL	Active	
2024	Noorda College of Osteopathic Medicine	Provo, Utah	UT	Active	
2024	New York University Grossman School of Medicine	New York City, New York	NY	Active	
2024	Sam Houston State University College of Osteopathic Medicine	Conroe, Texas	TX	Active	
2024	Touro University Nevada College of Osteopathic Medicine	Henderson, Nevada	NV	Active	
2025	California Health Sciences University College of Osteopathic Medicine	Clovis, California	CA	Active	
2025	Morehouse School of Medicine	Atlanta, Georgia	GA	Active	

== Resident chapters ==
Following are the Gold Honor Society's graduate or resident chapters.

Charter date	Institution	Location	Status	Ref.
2012	Baylor Scott & White Health	Dallas, Texas	Active	
2013	Baylor College of Medicine	Houston, Texas	Active	
2013	Beth Israel Deaconess Medical Center	Boston, Massachusetts	Active	
2013	George Washington University School of Medicine	Washington, D.C.	Active	
2013	Kaiser Permanente Northern California Residency Programs	Oakland, California	Active	
2013	New York University Langone Medical Center	New York City, New York	Active	
2013	Jacobs School of Medicine and Biomedical Sciences	Buffalo, New York	Active	
2013	University of Colorado School of Medicine	Aurora, Colorado	Active	
2013	Yale New Haven Hospital	New Haven, Connecticut	Active	
2015	Ohio State University College of Medicine	Columbus, Ohio	Active	
2015	Sidney Kimmel Medical College	Philadelphia, Pennsylvania	Active	
2015	UF Health Shands Hospital	Gainesville, Florida	Active	
2015	University of Missouri–Kansas City	Kansas City, Missouri	Active	
2016	NewYork-Presbyterian Hospital	New York City, New York	Active	
