= List of medical schools in the United States =

This list of medical schools in the United States includes current and developing academic institutions which award the Doctor of Medicine (MD) or the Doctor of Osteopathic Medicine (DO) degrees, either of which is required for comprehensive practice as a physician in the United States. MD-granting medical schools are accredited by the Liaison Committee on Medical Education (LCME) while DO-granting medical schools are accredited by the American Osteopathic Association Commission on Osteopathic College Accreditation (COCA). There are currently 158 accredited MD-granting institutions, and 37 accredited DO-granting institutions in the United States.

Alaska, Delaware, and Wyoming are the only states that lack independent medical schools. Delaware is served by the Sidney Kimmel Medical College at Thomas Jefferson University in Philadelphia through the Delaware Institute of Medical Education and Research. Alaska, Idaho, Montana, and Wyoming are all served by the University of Washington School of Medicine through the WWAMI Regional Medical Education Program.

In addition, Idaho and Montana both host independent DO-granting schools: the Idaho College of Osteopathic Medicine in Meridian, Idaho, and the Touro College of Osteopathic Medicine in Great Falls, Montana. Maine is served exclusively by one DO-granting school, the University of New England College of Osteopathic Medicine (UNECOM).

== MD-granting medical schools ==
MD-granting medical schools
State	City	School	Established	Type	Additional campuses
Alabama	Birmingham	University of Alabama at Birmingham School of Medicine	1859	Public	Tuscaloosa, Alabama; Huntsville, Alabama; Montgomery, Alabama
Alabama	Mobile	University of South Alabama Frederick P. Whiddon College of Medicine	1967	Public	
Arizona	Tucson	University of Arizona College of Medicine – Tucson	1967	Public	
Arizona	Phoenix	University of Arizona College of Medicine – Phoenix	2006	Public	
Arkansas	Bentonville	Alice L. Walton School of Medicine	2021	Private	
Arkansas	Little Rock	University of Arkansas for Medical Sciences College of Medicine	1879	Public	Fayetteville, Arkansas
California	Elk Grove	California Northstate University College of Medicine	2011	Private	
California	Colton	California University of Science and Medicine	2015	Private	
California	Los Angeles	Charles R. Drew University of Medicine and Science College of Medicine	2022	Private	
California	Pasadena	Kaiser Permanente Bernard J. Tyson School of Medicine	2019	Private	
California	Los Angeles	University of Southern California Keck School of Medicine	1885	Private	
California	Loma Linda	Loma Linda University School of Medicine	1909	Private	
California	Stanford	Stanford University School of Medicine	1908	Private	
California	Sacramento	University of California, Davis School of Medicine	1968	Public	
California	Irvine	University of California, Irvine School of Medicine	1965	Public	
California	Riverside	University of California, Riverside School of Medicine	2008	Public	
California	San Diego	University of California, San Diego School of Medicine	1968	Public	
California	San Francisco	University of California, San Francisco School of Medicine	1864	Public	Fresno, California
California	Los Angeles	University of California, Los Angeles David Geffen School of Medicine	1950	Public	
Colorado	Aurora	University of Colorado School of Medicine	1883	Public	Colorado Springs, Colorado; Fort Collins, Colorado
Connecticut	Farmington	University of Connecticut School of Medicine	1968	Public	
Connecticut	Hamden	Quinnipiac University Frank H. Netter MD School of Medicine	2010	Private	
Connecticut	New Haven	Yale School of Medicine	1810	Private	
District of Columbia	Washington, D.C.	George Washington University School of Medicine & Health Sciences	1825	Private	
District of Columbia	Washington, D.C.	Georgetown University School of Medicine	1851	Private	
District of Columbia	Washington, D.C.	Howard University College of Medicine	1868	Private	
Florida	Miami	Florida International University Herbert Wertheim College of Medicine	2006	Public	
Florida	Gainesville	University of Florida College of Medicine	1956	Public	Jacksonville, Florida
Florida	Boca Raton	Florida Atlantic University Charles E. Schmidt College of Medicine	2011	Public	
Florida	Tallahassee	Florida State University College of Medicine	2000	Public	Daytona Beach, Florida; Fort Pierce, Florida; Orlando, Florida; Pensacola, Florida; Sarasota, Florida
Florida	Miami	University of Miami Miller School of Medicine	1951	Private	Atlantis, Florida
Florida	Davie	Nova Southeastern University Dr. Kiran C. Patel College of Allopathic Medicine	2018	Private	
Florida	Orlando	University of Central Florida College of Medicine	2006	Public	
Florida	Tampa	University of South Florida Morsani College of Medicine	1971	Public	Allentown, Pennsylvania
Georgia	Atlanta	Emory University School of Medicine	1854	Private	
Georgia	Augusta	Augusta University Medical College of Georgia	1828	Public	
Georgia	Macon	Mercer University School of Medicine	1982	Private	Savannah, Georgia; Columbus, Georgia
Georgia	Atlanta	Morehouse School of Medicine	1975	Private	
Hawaii	Honolulu	University of Hawaiʻi at Mānoa John A. Burns School of Medicine	1965	Public	
Illinois	Urbana	University of Illinois Urbana-Champaign Carle Illinois College of Medicine	2017	Public	
Illinois	North Chicago	Rosalind Franklin University Chicago Medical School	1912	Private	
Illinois	Chicago	University of Chicago Pritzker School of Medicine	1927	Private	
Illinois	Chicago	University of Illinois College of Medicine	1881	Public	Rockford, Illinois; Peoria, Illinois; Urbana, Illinois (formerly)
Illinois	Maywood	Loyola University Chicago Stritch School of Medicine	1870	Private	
Illinois	Chicago	Northwestern University Feinberg School of Medicine	1859	Private	
Illinois	Chicago	Rush Medical College	1837	Private	
Illinois	Springfield	Southern Illinois University School of Medicine	1969	Public	
Indiana	Indianapolis	Indiana University School of Medicine	1903	Public	Gary, Indiana; Notre Dame, Indiana; Evansville, Indiana; Fort Wayne, Indiana; Muncie, Indiana; Terre Haute, Indiana; West Lafayette, Indiana; Bloomington, Indiana
Iowa	Iowa City	University of Iowa Carver College of Medicine	1870	Public	Des Moines, Iowa
Kansas	Kansas City	University of Kansas School of Medicine	1905	Public	Wichita, Kansas; Salina, Kansas
Kentucky	Lexington	University of Kentucky College of Medicine	1960	Public	Bowling Green, Kentucky; Morehead, Kentucky; Highland Heights, Kentucky
Kentucky	Louisville	University of Louisville School of Medicine	1846	Public	Madisonville, Kentucky
Louisiana	New Orleans	LSU Health New Orleans School of Medicine	1931	Public	Baton Rouge, Louisiana; Lafayette, Louisiana
Louisiana	Shreveport	LSU Health Shreveport School of Medicine	1968	Public	
Louisiana	New Orleans	Tulane University School of Medicine	1834	Private	
Maryland	Baltimore	Johns Hopkins School of Medicine	1893	Private	
Maryland	Baltimore	University of Maryland School of Medicine	1807	Public	
Maryland	Bethesda	Uniformed Services University of the Health Sciences F. Edward Hébert School of Medicine	1972	Federal	
Massachusetts	Boston	Boston University Chobanian & Avedisian School of Medicine	1848	Private	
Massachusetts	Boston	Harvard Medical School	1782	Private	
Massachusetts	Worcester	University of Massachusetts Chan Medical School	1962	Public	
Massachusetts	Boston	Tufts University School of Medicine	1893	Private	Portland, Maine
Michigan	Mount Pleasant	Central Michigan University College of Medicine	2010	Public	Detroit, Michigan; Midland, Michigan; Saginaw, Michigan; St. Joseph, Michigan
Michigan	Ann Arbor	University of Michigan Medical School	1850	Public	
Michigan	East Lansing	Michigan State University College of Human Medicine	1964	Public	Grand Rapids, Michigan; Flint, Michigan; Marquette, Michigan; Lansing, Michigan; Traverse City, Michigan; Midland, Michigan; Southfield, Michigan
Michigan	Rochester	Oakland University William Beaumont School of Medicine	2010	Private	
Michigan	Detroit	Wayne State University School of Medicine	1868	Public	
Michigan	Kalamazoo	Western Michigan University Homer Stryker M.D. School of Medicine	2011	Private	
Minnesota	Rochester	Mayo Clinic Alix School of Medicine	1972	Private	Scottsdale, Arizona; Jacksonville, Florida
Minnesota	Minneapolis	University of Minnesota Medical School	1888	Public	Duluth, Minnesota
Missouri	Columbia	University of Missouri School of Medicine	1841	Public	Springfield, Missouri
Missouri	Kansas City	University of Missouri–Kansas City School of Medicine	1971	Public	St. Joseph, Missouri
Missouri	St. Louis	Saint Louis University School of Medicine	1836	Private	
Missouri	St. Louis	Washington University School of Medicine	1891	Private	
Mississippi	Jackson	University of Mississippi School of Medicine	1955	Public	
Nebraska	Omaha	Creighton University School of Medicine	1892	Private	Phoenix, Arizona
Nebraska	Omaha	University of Nebraska Medical Center College of Medicine	1880	Public	
Nevada	Reno	University of Nevada, Reno School of Medicine	1969	Public	Elko, Nevada
Nevada	Las Vegas	University of Nevada, Las Vegas Kirk Kerkorian School of Medicine	2014	Public	
Nevada	Las Vegas	Roseman University College of Medicine	2025	Private	
New Hampshire	Hanover	Geisel School of Medicine at Dartmouth College	1797	Private	
New Jersey	Camden	Cooper Medical School of Rowan University	2011	Public	
New Jersey	Nutley	Hackensack Meridian School of Medicine	2016	Private	
New Jersey	Newark	Rutgers New Jersey Medical School	1954	Public	
New Jersey	Piscataway	Rutgers Robert Wood Johnson Medical School	1961	Public	Long Branch, New Jersey
New Mexico	Albuquerque	University of New Mexico School of Medicine	1964	Public	
New York	Albany	Albany Medical College	1839	Private	
New York	Buffalo	University at Buffalo Jacobs School of Medicine and Biomedical Sciences	1846	Public	
New York	New York City	City University of New York School of Medicine	2015	Public	
New York	New York City	State University of New York Downstate Health Sciences University College of Medicine	1860	Public	
New York	New York City	Columbia University Vagelos College of Physicians and Surgeons	1767	Private	
New York	New York City	Weill Cornell Medical College	1898	Private	
New York	New York City	Albert Einstein College of Medicine	1955	Private	
New York	New York City	Icahn School of Medicine at Mount Sinai	1968	Private	
New York	New York City	New York University Grossman School of Medicine	1841	Private	
New York	Mineola	New York University Grossman Long Island School of Medicine	2018	Private	
New York	Valhalla	New York Medical College	1860	Private	
New York	Stony Brook	Stony Brook University Renaissance School of Medicine	1971	Public	
New York	Rochester	University of Rochester School of Medicine & Dentistry	1850	Private	
New York	Syracuse	State University of New York Upstate Medical University Norton College of Medicine	1834	Public	Binghamton, New York
New York	Hempstead	Donald and Barbara Zucker School of Medicine at Hofstra/Northwell	2008	Private	
North Carolina	Durham	Duke University School of Medicine	1930	Private	
North Carolina	Greenville	East Carolina University Brody School of Medicine	1972	Public	
North Carolina	Chapel Hill	University of North Carolina School of Medicine	1879	Public	Wilmington, North Carolina; Charlotte, North Carolina; Asheville, North Carolina
North Carolina	Winston-Salem	Wake Forest School of Medicine	1902	Private	Winston-Salem, North Carolina; Charlotte, North Carolina
North Dakota	Grand Forks	University of North Dakota School of Medicine and Health Sciences	1905	Public	Bismarck, North Dakota; Fargo, North Dakota; Minot, North Dakota
Ohio	Cleveland	Case Western Reserve University School of Medicine	1843	Private	
Ohio	Cincinnati	University of Cincinnati College of Medicine	1819	Public	
Ohio	Rootstown	Northeast Ohio Medical University	1973	Public	
Ohio	Columbus	Ohio State University College of Medicine	1914	Public	
Ohio	Toledo	University of Toledo College of Medicine and Life Sciences	1964	Public	
Ohio	Dayton	Wright State University Boonshoft School of Medicine	1974	Public	
Oklahoma	Oklahoma City	University of Oklahoma College of Medicine	1900	Public	Tulsa, Oklahoma
Oregon	Portland	Oregon Health & Science University	1887	Public	
Pennsylvania	Philadelphia	Drexel University College of Medicine	1848	Private	Chester, Pennsylvania; York, Pennsylvania; Abington Township, Pennsylvania; Pittsburgh, Pennsylvania; West Reading, Pennsylvania
Pennsylvania	Scranton	Geisinger Commonwealth School of Medicine	2008	Private	Wilkes-Barre, Pennsylvania; Sayre, Pennsylvania; Danville, Pennsylvania; Atlantic City, New Jersey; Lewistown, Pennsylvania
Pennsylvania	Philadelphia	Thomas Jefferson University Sidney Kimmel Medical College	1824	Private	
Pennsylvania	Hershey	Penn State University College of Medicine	1967	State-related	State College, Pennsylvania
Pennsylvania	Philadelphia	University of Pennsylvania Perelman School of Medicine	1765	Private	
Pennsylvania	Pittsburgh	University of Pittsburgh School of Medicine	1886	State-related	
Pennsylvania	Philadelphia	Temple University Lewis Katz School of Medicine	1901	Private	Bethlehem, Pennsylvania
Puerto Rico	Bayamón	Universidad Central del Caribe School of Medicine	1976	Private	
Puerto Rico	Ponce	Ponce Health Sciences University School of Medicine	1980	Private	St. Louis, Missouri (2020); British Virgin Islands (2025)
Puerto Rico	San Juan	University of Puerto Rico School of Medicine	1949	Public	
Puerto Rico	Caguas	San Juan Bautista School of Medicine	1978	Private	
Rhode Island	Providence	Brown University Alpert Medical School	1975	Private	
South Carolina	Charleston	Medical University of South Carolina	1824	Public	Anderson, South Carolina
South Carolina	Columbia	University of South Carolina School of Medicine Columbia	1977	Public	Florence, South Carolina
South Carolina	Greenville	University of South Carolina School of Medicine Greenville	2012	Public	
South Dakota	Sioux Falls	University of South Dakota Sanford School of Medicine	1907	Public	Rapid City, South Dakota; Yankton, South Dakota; Vermillion, South Dakota; Spearfish, South Dakota; Pierre, South Dakota
Tennessee	Johnson City	East Tennessee State University James H. Quillen College of Medicine	1974	Public	
Tennessee	Nashville	Meharry Medical College	1876	Private	
Tennessee	Nashville	Belmont University Thomas F. Frist, Jr. College of Medicine	2023	Private	
Tennessee	Memphis	University of Tennessee College of Medicine	1911	Public	Chattanooga, Tennessee; Knoxville, Tennessee; Nashville, Tennessee
Tennessee	Nashville	Vanderbilt University School of Medicine	1873	Private	
Texas	Houston	Baylor College of Medicine	1900	Private	Temple, Texas
Texas	Houston	University of Houston Tilman J. Fertitta Family College of Medicine	2020	Public	
Texas	Houston	McGovern Medical School at The University of Texas Health Science Center at Houston	1970	Public	
Texas	Fort Worth	Texas Christian University Anne Burnett Marion School of Medicine	2019	Private	
Texas	Bryan	Texas A&M University Naresh K. Vashisht College of Medicine	1973	Public	Bryan, Texas; Dallas, Texas; Houston, Texas; Kingsville, Texas; Round Rock, Texas; San Antonio, Texas
Texas	Lubbock	Texas Tech University Health Sciences Center School of Medicine	1969	Public	Amarillo, Texas; Odessa, Texas; Lubbock, Texas (Covenant Branch)
Texas	Tyler	University of Texas at Tyler School of Medicine	2022	Public	
Texas	El Paso	Texas Tech University Health Sciences Center El Paso Paul L. Foster School of Medicine	2008	Public	
Texas	Austin	University of Texas at Austin Dell Medical School	2013	Public	
Texas	Galveston	University of Texas Medical Branch	1891	Public	
Texas	Edinburg	University of Texas Rio Grande Valley School of Medicine	2015	Public	
Texas	San Antonio	University of Texas Health Sciences Center at San Antonio Long School of Medicine	1968	Public	
Texas	Dallas	University of Texas Southwestern Medical Center	1943	Public	
Utah	Salt Lake City	University of Utah School of Medicine	1905	Public	
Vermont	Burlington	University of Vermont Larner College of Medicine	1822	Public	Danbury, Connecticut; Norwalk, Connecticut
Virginia	Norfolk	Eastern Virginia Medical School at Old Dominion University	1973	Public	
Virginia	Charlottesville	University of Virginia School of Medicine	1825	Public	Falls Church, Virginia (shared with VCU)
Virginia	Richmond	Virginia Commonwealth University School of Medicine	1838	Public	Falls Church, Virginia (shared with UVA)
Virginia	Roanoke	Virginia Tech Carilion School of Medicine	2008	Public	
Washington	Seattle	University of Washington School of Medicine	1946	Public	As part of the WWAMI Regional Medical Education Program, the school has regional campuses in: Moscow, Idaho; Laramie, Wyoming; Bozeman, Montana; Anchorage, Alaska; Spokane, Washington
Washington	Spokane	Washington State University Elson S. Floyd College of Medicine	2015	Public	Everett, Washington; Richland, Washington; Vancouver, Washington
West Virginia	Huntington	Marshall University Joan C. Edwards School of Medicine	1977	Public	
West Virginia	Morgantown	West Virginia University School of Medicine	1903	Public	Charleston, West Virginia; Martinsburg, West Virginia
Wisconsin	Milwaukee	Medical College of Wisconsin	1893	Private	De Pere, Wisconsin; Wausau, Wisconsin
Wisconsin	Madison	University of Wisconsin School of Medicine and Public Health	1907	Public	

Source: (Note: Information in table can be sourced to each school's Medical School Admission Requirements page, unless otherwise indicated.)

== DO-granting medical schools ==
DO-granting medical schools
State	City	School	Est.	Type	Additional campuses
Alabama	Dothan	Alabama College of Osteopathic Medicine	2010	Private	
Alabama	Auburn	Edward Via College of Osteopathic Medicine Auburn	2014	Private	
Arizona	Mesa	A.T. Still University School of Osteopathic Medicine in Arizona	2006	Private	
Arizona	Glendale	Midwestern University Arizona College of Osteopathic Medicine	1995	Private	
Arkansas	Fort Smith	Arkansas College of Osteopathic Medicine	2014	Private	
California	Clovis	California Health Sciences University College of Osteopathic Medicine	2016	Private	
California	Vallejo	Touro University California College of Osteopathic Medicine	1997	Private	
California	Pomona	Western University of Health Sciences College of Osteopathic Medicine of the Pacific	1977	Private	Lebanon, Oregon
Colorado	Parker	Rocky Vista University College of Osteopathic Medicine	2006	Private	Ivins, Utah; Billings, Montana
Florida	Bradenton	Lake Erie College of Osteopathic Medicine Bradenton	2004	Private	
Florida	Fort Lauderdale	Nova Southeastern University Dr. Kiran C. Patel College of Osteopathic Medicine	1979	Private	Clearwater, Florida
Florida	Jacksonville	Lake Erie College of Osteopathic Medicine Jacksonville	2026	Private	
Florida	Winter Garden	Orlando College of Osteopathic Medicine	2023	Private	
Georgia	Suwanee	Philadelphia College of Osteopathic Medicine Georgia	2005	Private	
Idaho	Meridian	Idaho College of Osteopathic Medicine	2016	Private	
Illinois	Chicago	The Chicago School Illinois College of Osteopathic Medicine,	2026	Private	
Illinois	Downers Grove	Midwestern University Chicago College of Osteopathic Medicine	1900	Private	
Indiana	Indianapolis	Marian University College of Osteopathic Medicine	2010	Private	
Iowa	Des Moines	Des Moines University College of Osteopathic Medicine	1898	Private	
Kansas	Wichita	Kansas Health Science Center–Kansas College of Osteopathic Medicine	2021	Private	
Kentucky	Pikeville	University of Pikeville Kentucky College of Osteopathic Medicine	1997	Private	
Louisiana	Monroe	Edward Via College of Osteopathic Medicine Louisiana	2019	Private	
Maine	Biddeford	University of New England College of Osteopathic Medicine	1978	Private	
Maryland	Hagerstown	Meritus School of Osteopathic Medicine	2022		
Michigan	East Lansing	Michigan State University College of Osteopathic Medicine	1969	Public	Clinton Township, Macomb County, Michigan; Detroit, Michigan
Mississippi	Hattiesburg	William Carey University College of Osteopathic Medicine	2010	Private	
Missouri	Kirksville	A. T. Still University Kirksville College of Osteopathic Medicine	1892	Private	
Missouri	Kansas City	Kansas City University College of Osteopathic Medicine	1916	Private	Joplin, Missouri
Montana	Great Falls	Touro University Montana College of Osteopathic Medicine	2023	Private	
Nevada	Henderson	Touro University Nevada College of Osteopathic Medicine	2004	Private	
New Jersey	Stratford	Rowan-Virtua School of Osteopathic Medicine	1976	Public	
New Mexico	Las Cruces	Burrell College of Osteopathic Medicine at New Mexico State University	2013	Private	Melbourne, Florida
New York	Buffalo	D'Youville University College of Osteopathic Medicine	2026	Private	
New York	Old Westbury	New York Institute of Technology College of Osteopathic Medicine	1977	Private	Jonesboro, Arkansas
New York	New York City	Touro College of Osteopathic Medicine	2007	Private	Middletown, Orange County, New York; Great Falls, Montana
North Carolina	Lillington	Campbell University School of Osteopathic Medicine	2011	Private	
Ohio	Athens	Ohio University Heritage College of Osteopathic Medicine	1975	Public	Dublin, Ohio; Cleveland, Ohio
Oklahoma	Tulsa	Oklahoma State University Center for Health Sciences College of Osteopathic Medicine	1972	Public	Tahlequah, Oklahoma
Pennsylvania	Erie	Lake Erie College of Osteopathic Medicine	1992	Private	Greensburg, Pennsylvania; Elmira, New York
Pennsylvania	Philadelphia	Philadelphia College of Osteopathic Medicine	1899	Private	Moultrie, Georgia
Pennsylvania	Pittsburgh	Duquesne University College of Osteopathic Medicine	2024	Private	
South Carolina	Spartanburg	Edward Via College of Osteopathic Medicine Carolinas	2010	Private	
Tennessee	Harrogate	Lincoln Memorial University DeBusk College of Osteopathic Medicine	2007	Private	Knoxville, Tennessee
Tennessee	Memphis	Baptist Health Sciences University College of Osteopathic Medicine	2021	Private	
Texas	Conroe	Sam Houston State University College of Osteopathic Medicine	2019	Public	
Texas	San Antonio	University of the Incarnate Word School of Osteopathic Medicine	2015	Private	
Texas	Fort Worth	University of North Texas Health Science Center Texas College of Osteopathic Medicine	1970	Public	
Utah	Provo	Noorda College of Osteopathic Medicine	2019	Private	
Virginia	Blacksburg	Edward Via College of Osteopathic Medicine Virginia	2003	Private	
Virginia	Lynchburg	Liberty University College of Osteopathic Medicine	2012	Private	
Washington	Yakima	Pacific Northwest University of Health Sciences College of Osteopathic Medicine	2005	Private	
West Virginia	Lewisburg	West Virginia School of Osteopathic Medicine	1972	Public	

Source: (Note: Information in table can be sourced to each school's Choose DO page, unless otherwise indicated.)

== Developing medical schools ==
The following medical schools are under "applicant" or "candidate" status with either COCA or LCME.

Developing medical schools
State	City	School	Degree	Status	Ref.
Arizona	Phoenix (Note: Though listed as in Tempe by LCME, the facilities for this medical school will be in Phoenix.)	Arizona State University John Shufeldt School of Medicine and Medical Engineering	MD	Candidate - proposed start 2026	
Arizona	Phoenix	Valley College of Osteopathic Medicine	DO	Candidate - proposed start Fall 2026	
Colorado	Greeley	University of Northern Colorado College of Osteopathic Medicine	DO	Candidate - proposed start Fall 2026	
Georgia	Athens	University of Georgia School of Medicine	MD	Candidate - proposed start Fall 2026	
Iowa	Dubuque	University of Dubuque College of Osteopathic Medicine	DO	Candidate - proposed start Fall 2028	
Kansas	Atchison	Benedictine College School of Osteopathic Medicine	DO	Applicant - proposed start Fall 2028	
North Carolina	Fayetteville	Methodist University School of Medicine at Cape Fear Valley Health	MD	Applicant - proposed start Fall 2026	
Ohio	Cincinnati	Xavier University College of Osteopathic Medicine	DO	Applicant - proposed start 2027	
Pennsylvania	Indiana	Indiana University of Pennsylvania College of Osteopathic Medicine	DO	Candidate - proposed start Fall 2027	
Utah	Provo	Brigham Young University College of Medicine	MD	Candidate - proposed start Fall 2027	
Virgin Islands	Charlotte Amalie	University of the Virgin Islands College of Medicine	MD	Applicant	
Texas	Houston	Texas A&M University School of Engineering Medicine	MD	Applicant	
California	Signal Hill	American University of Health Sciences School of Medicine	MD	Applicant	
California	San Joaquin Valley	Aria University School of Medicine	MD	Applicant - proposed start Fall 2027	
Louisiana	New Orleans	Xavier Ochsner College of Medicine	MD	Candidate	
California	Stockton	University of the Pacific Pacific School of Medicine	MD	Applicant - proposed start Fall 2030	

== See also ==
- List of defunct medical schools in the United States
- Medical education in the United States
- Medical school in the United States
- The Flexner Report
- Medical School Admission Requirements (MSAR)
