= List of Sigma Sigma Phi chapters =

Sigma Sigma Phi is an American osteopathic medicine honors fraternity for students training to be Doctors of Osteopathic Medicine. It was founded in 1921 at the American School of Osteopathy (now A.T. Still University) in Kirksville, Missouri. Following are the chapters of Sigma Sigma Phi, with active chapters in bold and inactive chapters and institutions in italics.

Chapter	Charter date and range	Institution	Location	Status	Ref.
**Alpha**	1921	A.T. Still University	Kirksville, Missouri	Active	(Note: Chapter formed at the Kirksville College of Osteopathic Medicine, now A.T. Still University)
**Beta**	1925	Des Moines University	Des Moines, Iowa	Active	(Note: Chapter formed at Still College, now Des Moines University.)
Gamma (First)	1930	Los Angeles College of Osteopathic Physicians and Surgeons	Irvine, California	Inactive, Reassigned	(Note: Chapter formed at the Los Angeles College of Osteopathic Physicians and Surgeons, which merged to form the California College of Osteopathic Physicians and Surgeons and is now UC Irvine School of Medicine.)
**Delta**	1932	Kansas City University	Kansas City, Missouri	Active	(Note: Chapter formed at Kansas City College of Osteopathy and Surgery, now Kansas City University.)
**Delta**	May 2018	Kansas City University, Joplin	Joplin, Missouri	Active	(Note: Chapter formed at Kansas City College of Osteopathy and Surgery, now Kansas City University.)
**Epsilon**	1939	Chicago College of Osteopathic Medicine	Downers Grove, Illinois	Active	
**Zeta**	19xx ?–19xx ?; March 1997	Philadelphia College of Osteopathic Medicine	Philadelphia, Pennsylvania	Active	
**Zeta**		Philadelphia College of Osteopathic Medicine, Moultrie Campus	Moultrie, Georgia	Active	
**Zeta**		Philadelphia College of Osteopathic Medicine, Suwanee Campus	Suwanee, Georgia	Active	
**Eta**		University of North Texas Health Science Center	Fort Worth, Texas	Active	
**Theta**		Oklahoma State University Center for Health Sciences College of Osteopathic Medicine	Tulsa, Oklahoma	Active	
**Iota**		Michigan State University College of Osteopathic Medicine	East Lansing, Michigan	Active	
**Kappa**		University of New England College of Osteopathic Medicine	Biddeford, Maine	Active	
**Lambda**		Heritage College of Osteopathic Medicine	Athens, Ohio	Active	
**Lambda**	September 2016	Heritage College of Osteopathic Medicine, Dublin	Dublin, Ohio	Active	
**Lambda**	September 2019	Heritage College of Osteopathic Medicine, Cleveland	Cleveland, Ohio	Active	
**Mu**		College of Osteopathic Medicine of the Pacific	Pomona, California	Active	
**Mu**		College of Osteopathic Medicine of the Pacific, Northwest	Lebanon, Oregon	Active	
**Nu**		West Virginia School of Osteopathic Medicine	Lewisburg, West Virginia	Active	
**Xi**		Nova Southeastern College of Osteopathic Medicine	Davie, Florida	Active	
**Xi**		Nova Southeastern College of Osteopathic Medicine, Clearwater	Clearwater, Florida	Active	
**Gamma (Second)**	May 8, 2002	Lake Erie College of Osteopathic Medicine	Erie, Pennsylvania	Active	
**Gamma (Second)**	February 2012	Lake Erie College of Osteopathic Medicine at Bradenton	Bradenton, Florida	Active	
**Gamma (Second)**	October 2016	Lake Erie College of Osteopathic Medicine at Seton Hill	Greensburg, Pennsylvania	Active	
**Gamma (Second)**		Lake Erie College of Osteopathic Medicine at Elmira	Elmira, New York	Active	
**Omicron**	October 12, 2003	Rowan-Virtua School of Osteopathic Medicine	Stratford, New Jersey	Active	(Note: Chapter was chartered at the University of Medicine & Dentistry of New Jersey School of Osteopathic Medicine, now Rowan-Virtua School of Osteopathic Medicine.)
Pi		Touro University College of Osteopathic Medicine, Nevada	Henderson, Nevada	Inactive	
**Rho**		Arizona College of Osteopathic Medicine	Glendale, Arizona	Active	
**Sigma**	October 12, 2003	University of Pikeville Kentucky College of Osteopathic Medicine	Pikesville, Kentucky	Active	
**Tau**	October 2006	Touro University California College of Osteopathic Medicine	Vallejo, California	Active	
**Tau**	October 2009	Touro University California College of Osteopathic Medicine, Henderson	Henderson, Nevada	Active	
**Upsilon**		A.T. Still University: School of Osteopathic Medicine in Arizona	Mesa, Arizona	Active	
**Phi**	February 2008	Lincoln Memorial University - DeBusk College of Osteopathic Medicine	Harrogate, Tennessee	Active	
**Chi**	October 2006	Edward Via College of Osteopathic Medicine	Blacksburg, Virginia	Active	
**Chi**	October 2012	Edward Via College of Osteopathic Medicine, Carolinas Campus	Spartanburg, South Carolina	Active	
**Chi**	Fall 2015	Edward Via College of Osteopathic Medicine, Auburn Campus	Auburn, Alabama	Active	
**Psi**		Touro University College of Osteopathic Medicine, New York	Harlem, New York City, New York	Active	
**Psi**	February 2017	Touro University College of Osteopathic Medicine, Middletown	Middletown, New York	Active	
**Psi**		Touro University College of Osteopathic Medicine, Great Falls	Great Falls, Montana	Active	
**Omega**	19xx ?–xxxx ?; February 16, 2008	New York Institute of Technology College of Osteopathic Medicine	Old Wesbury, New York	Active	
**Omega**	Spring 2019	New York Institute of Technology College of Osteopathic Medicine, Jonesboro Campus	Jonesboro, Arkansas	Active	
Alpha Alpha		Lake Erie College of Osteopathic Medicine, Bradenton Campus	Bradenton, Florida	Inactive	
**Gamma Delta**	April 2011	Pacific Northwest University College of Osteopathic Medicine	Yakima, Washington	Active	
**Omicron Theta**	September 2011	Rocky Vista University College of Osteopathic Medicine	Englewood, Colorado	Active	
**Omicron Theta**	September 2019	Rocky Vista University College of Osteopathic Medicine, Ivins Campus	Ivins, Utah	Active	
**Alpha Mu**	October 2012	William Carey University College of Osteopathic Medicine	Hattiesburg, Mississippi	Active	
**Mu Upsilon**	December 2014	Marian University College of Osteopathic Medicine	Indianapolis, Indiana	Active	
**Alpha Omega**	February 2015	Liberty University College of Osteopathic Medicine	Lynchburg, Virginia	Active	
**Alpha Beta**	June 2015	Alabama College of Osteopathic Medicine	Dothan, Alabama	Active	
**Alpha Gamma**		College of Osteopathic Medicine, Sam Houston State University	Huntsville, Texas	Active	
**Alpha Lambda**		California Health Sciences University College of Osteopathic Medicine	Clovis, California	Active	
**Chi Upsilon**	August 2017	Campbell University Jerry M Wallace School of Osteopathic Medicine	Lillington, North Carolina	Active	
**Beta Chi**	November 2017	Burrell College of Osteopathic Medicine	Las Cruces, New Mexico	Active	
**Beta Chi**		Burrell College of Osteopathic Medicine, Melbourne	Melbourne, Florida	Active	
**Alpha Rho**	September 2018	Arkansas College of Osteopathic Medicine	Fort Smith, Arkansas	Active	
**Alpha Psi**		University of the Incarnate Word School of Osteopathic Medicine	San Antonio, Texas	Active	
Zeta Alpha		Philadelphia College of Osteopathic Medicine, Georgia Campus	Suwanee, Georgia		
**Iota Delta**		Idaho College of Osteopathic Medicine	Meridian, Idaho	Active	
**Kappa Chi**	202x ?	Kansas College of Osteopathic Medicine	Wichita, Kansas	Active	
