= GHHS =

GHHS may refer to:

- Guy's Hill High School in Saint Catherine, Jamaica
- Garfield Heights High School in Garfield Heights, Ohio
- Gig Harbor High School in Gig Harbor, Washington
- Granite Hills High School (Apple Valley, California)
- Granite Hills High School (El Cajon, California)
- Granite Hills High School (Porterville, California)
- Green Hope High School in Cary, North Carolina
- Granada Hills High School, the former name of Granada Hills Charter High School
- Gold Humanism Honor Society, medical honor society
