= MSAR =

MSAR can refer to:

- Macao Special Administrative Region
- Mounted search and rescue
- Microtech Small Arms Research Inc.
- Medical School Admission Requirements of the Association of American Medical Colleges (AAMC)
