= ICOM =

ICOM may refer to:

- International Council of Museums
- Idaho College of Osteopathic Medicine, a medical school in the United States
- Icom Incorporated, radio equipment manufacturer
- Industrial Common Ownership Movement (ICOM), a co-operative federation that now forms part of Co-operatives UK
- Inputs, Controls, Outputs, and Mechanisms (ICOM), the conceptual parts of the IDEF0 function modeling methodology
- ICOM Simulations, software company
- Intermediate in Commerce (I.Com), a course for the completion of the Higher Secondary School Certificate in Pakistan
