= Meritus School of Osteopathic Medicine =

American osteopathic medical school

- Other name: MSOM
- Type: Private medical school
- Established: 2022
- Affiliations: Meritus Health
- President: Maulik Joshi
- Dean: Brian A. Kessler
- Location: 11120 Health Drive Hagerstown, MD, United States, Maryland 21742, Hagerstown, Maryland, United States
- Campus: Rural
- Website: msom.org

The Meritus School of Osteopathic Medicine (MSOM) is a private medical school. The campus is located Hagerstown. The school was established in 2022, and holds pre-accreditation status with the American Osteopathic Association's Commission on Osteopathic College Accreditation. The inaugural class is expected to consist of 90 students, with courses beginning in fall 2025. The school is affiliated with Meritus Health.

== History ==
The school was established in 2022, as the first medical school to open in Maryland in a century.

== Campus ==
Construction of the medical school began in 2022, with an estimated cost of $85-90 million.

== See also ==
- List of medical schools in the United States
