= Illinois College of Osteopathic Medicine =

Medical school in Chicago

- Type: Private medical school
- Established: 2023; 3 years ago
- Parent institution: The Chicago School
- Location: Chicago, Illinois, United States; 41.88791°N 87.64262°W
- Campus: Urban: Chicago
- Colors: Black and Blue
- Website: www.thechicagoschool.edu

Illinois College of Osteopathic Medicine (ICOM) is the medical school of The Chicago School in Chicago, Illinois. Founded in 2023, ICOM grants the Doctor of Osteopathic Medicine (D.O.) academic degree. ICOM holds pre-accreditation status with the American Osteopathic Association's Commission on Osteopathic College Accreditation (COCA).

== History ==
ICOM was established in 2023. At the time, ICOM was the first medical school to open in Chicago in 100 years. The inaugural class is expected to start courses in 2026.

== Campus ==
The medical school will be housed in an 8-floor, 247,000 square foot building in the West Loop neighborhood of Chicago. The medical school campus was built at a cost of $48 million. The medical building was formerly the headquarters for Tyson Foods.

== Academics ==
The school confers the Doctor of Osteopathic Medicine degree.

== See also ==
- List of medical schools in the United States
