= WWAMI Regional Medical Education Program =

Medical education partnership in the western US

The WWAMI Regional Medical Education Program (often merely referred to as "WWAMI", pronounced "wammy") is a partnership in the western United States, established in 1971 between the state of Washington, the University of Washington School of Medicine, and the states of Wyoming (joined in 1996), Alaska, Montana and Idaho, hence the acronym "WWAMI."

== Background ==
In 1970, prompted by the shortage of primary care physicians that have historically affected rural areas, the UW School of Medicine created a four-state (later five-state, with the inclusion of Wyoming in 1996) community-based medical education program with the goal of increasing the number of primary care physicians throughout the northwest United States.

WWAMI was created as a regional medical education program for neighboring states that, at the time, lacked their own medical schools. (Note: The Idaho College of Osteopathic Medicine was founded in Meridian, Idaho, in 2016, and the Touro College of Osteopathic Medicine Great Falls Campus was founded in Great Falls, Montana, in 2023.) It also aimed to encourage physicians-in-training to stay and practice in the region, as the amount of time students spend in a given state is thought to increase their likelihood of practicing there after graduation. The program is largely considered a success, and serves as a model for comprehensive regional medical education.

Prior to the addition of Wyoming in 1996, the program was known as "WAMI." That state's previous arrangement was with the private Creighton University School of Medicine in Omaha, Nebraska.

== Program ==
The program has five stated goals:

1. Provide publicly supported medical education
2. Increase the number of primary care physicians and correct the maldistribution of physicians
3. Provide community-based medical education
4. Expand graduate medical education and continuing medical education
5. Provide all of these in a cost-effective manner

The program model uses existing state universities in the five states for the first 18 months of medical school - the Foundations Phase - the equivalent of years one and two. For the third and fourth years of clinical education, sites across the five states are used. There are over 3,000 individual physicians affiliated with WWAMI that are available for the required and elective clerkships.

The program provides in-state tuition rates for all parts of the program, dramatically reducing educational costs. Each state subsidizes tuition for their students. With only a limited number of spots available, admission is competitive.

== Participating schools ==
The following schools participate in the WWAMI program:

- Montana State University in Bozeman
- University of Alaska Anchorage, (formerly at University of Alaska Fairbanks, until 1989)
- University of Idaho in Moscow
- University of Washington in Seattle
- University of Wyoming in Laramie
- Gonzaga University in Spokane (formerly at Washington State University in Pullman until 2008, then at Washington State University in Spokane until 2016 when WSU established its own medical school)

== Class sizes in each of the WWAMI states ==
- Washington/Seattle: 100
- Washington/Spokane: 60
- Wyoming: 20
- Alaska: 30
- Montana: 30
- Idaho: 40

== See also ==
- List of medical schools in the United States
- University of Washington School of Medicine
- Western Interstate Commission for Higher Education
