= Valley College of Osteopathic Medicine =

American osteopathic medical school

- Other names: Valley COM
- Type: Private, for-profit medical school
- Established: 2023
- Location: 2525 W Townley Avenue, Phoenix, Arizona, United States; 33.5651°N 112.1127°W
- Campus: Urban
- Website: thevalleycom.org

The Valley College of Osteopathic Medicine (Valley COM) is a private for-profit medical school in Phoenix, Arizona. The school was established in 2023, and holds pre-accreditation status with the American Osteopathic Association's Commission on Osteopathic College Accreditation. The inaugural class is expected to begin classes in July 2026.

== History ==
The college was established in 2023. In December 2025, the college was granted pre-accreditation status by the American Osteopathic Association's Commission on Osteopathic College Accreditation. The inaugural class is expected to begin courses in July 2026.

== Campus ==
The medical school campus is located on 11 acres in Phoenix, Arizona. The college is housed in a 100,000 square foot facility.

== See also ==
- List of medical schools in the United States
