= California Northstate University College of Medicine =

Medical school in California, US

- Type: Private
- Established: 2015
- Parent institution: California Northstate University
- President: Alvin Cheung, PharmD, MHSA
- Dean: James Aguayo-Martel, MD, MPH
- Students: ~450
- Location: Elk Grove, California, United States; 38.4057°N 121.4812°W
- Website: http://medicine.cnsu.edu

California Northstate University College of Medicine is a private medical school located in Elk Grove, California, offering the Doctor of Medicine (MD) degree. It is one of seven colleges within California Northstate University, which also includes the College of Pharmacy (PharmD, MS), College of Dental Medicine (DMD), College of Health Sciences (BA, BS), College of Psychology (PsyD, MA), College of Graduate Studies (PhD, MS, MHA), and the College of Nursing, established in Fall 2024. Founded in 2015, the College of Medicine currently enrolls approximately 450 students.

== History ==
California Northstate University (CNU) established the College of Pharmacy in 2008. In 2010, senior staff at the College of Pharmacy initiated discussions regarding the development of a medical school in the greater Sacramento area. These discussions were influenced by studies highlighting the need for additional primary care physicians in California. At the time, financial constraints limited the state's ability to expand medical student training. One of the stated goals in creating the College of Medicine was to address the shortage of primary care physicians in the state. According to CNU, its educational philosophy emphasizes the development of life-long learners prepared to serve their communities as leaders in healthcare science, education, and research. Reflecting this philosophy, university leadership developed a strategic plan focused on education, partnership, and scholarship.

By July 2011, the foundational structure and curriculum of the College of Medicine had been formulated. Medical professionals and community stakeholders from the Sacramento Valley participated in shaping the curriculum and organizational framework.

Joseph Silva served as the founding Dean of the College of Medicine from 2015 to 2021. Catherine Yang was appointed as interim Dean from 2021 to mid-2023. In June 2023, following a nationwide search, Richard Isaacs was named Dean and Senior Vice President of Medical and Academic Affairs.

== Accreditation ==
In July 2025, the College of Medicine was granted full accreditation by the Liaison Committee on Medical Education (LCME), marking the completion of the accreditation process for its MD program. The college previously received preliminary accreditation in June 2015 and provisional accreditation in June 2019. In March 2024, it was placed on provisional accreditation with probation due to areas needing improvement, such as administrative processes, curriculum design, and the sustainability of student support services. A limited survey visit took place in February 2025, followed by an LCME review in June 2025, resulting in the conferral of full accreditation.

The parent institution, California Northstate University, is accredited by the Western Association of Schools and Colleges (WASC). The university received initial accreditation in 2012 and underwent reaffirmation in June 2025.

== Students ==
The College of Medicine enrolled its first class of 60 students in August 2015, Subsequent entering classes from 2016 to 2019 (graduating from 2020 to 2023) had an average class size of 94 students. As of the current academic year, each cohort enrolls approximately 118 students.

Since its establishment, the college has maintained an acceptance rate ranging from 1.7% to 3.4%. For the currently enrolled cohorts, the average acceptance rate is 2.5%, with an average MCAT score of 513 and an average undergraduate GPA of 3.77.

== Residency Placement ==
Graduates of the College of Medicine at California Northstate University have participated in the National Resident Matching Program (NRMP) since the school's first graduating class in 2019. For the Class of 2024, 95% of applicants secured residency positions beginning in July 2024, spanning 18 medical specialties and 68 training institutions. Among these, 47.9% matched into primary care fields, including 37.5% in internal medicine, 6.3% in family medicine, and 4.2% in pediatrics. An additional 10.4% matched into specialties classified as highly competitive, such as neurological surgery, ophthalmology, otolaryngology, orthopedic surgery, and diagnostic or interventional radiology.

Approximately 59.4% of matched graduates accepted residency positions in California, aligning with the institution’s stated mission to address physician workforce needs within the state. Residency placements included programs at Baylor College of Medicine, Weill Cornell Medical Center, Dartmouth-Hitchcock, Johns Hopkins Hospital, Stanford Health Care, Vanderbilt University Medical Center, multiple University of California campuses (UCLA, UCSF, UCSD, UCI, and UCD), Loma Linda University, and the University of Southern California.

In prior years, the College of Medicine reported a 97% match rate for the Class of 2023 and a 96.3% match rate for its inaugural Class of 2019.

== Hospitals ==
As of 2025, California Northstate University does not own or operate a university-affiliated hospital, although planning efforts for a future facility are ongoing. Clinical clerkships for students in the College of Medicine are conducted at multiple affiliated sites, primarily in Northern California, with additional rotations available in Central and Southern California. The college maintains affiliations with several major health systems, including Kaiser Permanente, Dignity Health, and Sutter Health. The current list of affiliated clinical training sites include:

- Adventist Health (Lodi, Woodland, Yuba City)
- AHMC Healthcare (Alhambra, Whittier)
- Alameda Health System (Oakland)
- California Heart Associates (Fresno)
- California Maternal Fetal Medicine (Sacramento)
- Capital Nephrology Medical Group (Elk Grove)
- Capital Pediatrics (Sacramento)
- Kaiser Permanente (Northern California)
- NorthBay Medical Center (Fairfield)
- Mercy Methodist (Sacramento)
- Mercy San Juan Medical Center - Dignity (Carmichael)
- Oncology Associates of North California (Folsom)
- Oroville Hospital (Oroville)
- Pacific Heart (La Jolla)
- Rocklin Family Practice and Sports Medicine (Rocklin)
- San Joaquin General Hospital (French Camp)
- Santa Clara Valley Medical Center (Santa Clara)
- Shasta Regional Medical Center (Redding)
- Sierra Vista Hospital (Sacramento)
- Sutter Health (Amador, Roseville, Sacramento)

=== Medical hub ===
In December 2018, California Northstate University announced plans to develop the California Northstate University Medical Center (CNUMC), originally proposed for Elk Grove. In June 2021, the university identified a new site for the project: the former Arco/Sleep Train Arena in Sacramento, California, near Interstate 5. On February 15, 2022, the Sacramento City Council unanimously approved planning entitlements for a new teaching hospital at the site. The medical center is planned as part of the broader Innovation Park project, a proposed mixed-use development that includes residential, commercial, educational, and healthcare facilities. According to university-released projections, the project could generate approximately $14 billion in economic activity over the next decade and create an estimated 87,000 jobs.

The first phase of construction includes a 14-story hospital building of approximately 730,000 square feet, with an anticipated capacity of 350 to 400 inpatient beds, including 60 intensive care unit (ICU) beds and shelled space allowing for future expansion to 420 beds.

The overall campus is planned to include eighteen buildings across four functional zones:

- Medical Zone (~1,609,000 sq ft), including the hospital, ambulatory care, central plant, and parking/retail structures
- University Zone (~918,000 sq ft) for academic and administrative functions
- Housing Zone (~672,400 sq ft) including dormitories, faculty housing, senior living, and daycare
- Research/Laboratory Zone (~480,000 sq ft) for pharmaceutical and lab research

Planned features of the medical facility include at least 39 emergency department beds (with some planning documents indicating up to 71), a trauma center, operating suites, diagnostic imaging (CT and MRI), a helipad, and plans to pursue Level II trauma center designation.

According to university communications from mid-2023 and early 2025, construction is expected to begin in 2025, with Phase 1 completion anticipated between 2026 and 2027.

== See also ==
- List of medical schools in the United States
- Liaison Committee on Medical Education
- Western Association of Schools and Colleges
- Kaiser Permanente
- Dignity Health
- Sutter Health
