= FHCHS =

FHCHS may refer to:

- Florida Hospital College of Health Sciences, renamed in 2012 to AdventHealth University, in Orlando, Florida, United States
- Forest Hill Community High School, in West Palm Beach, Florida, United States
