= Elson S. Floyd College of Medicine =

Medical school of Washington State University

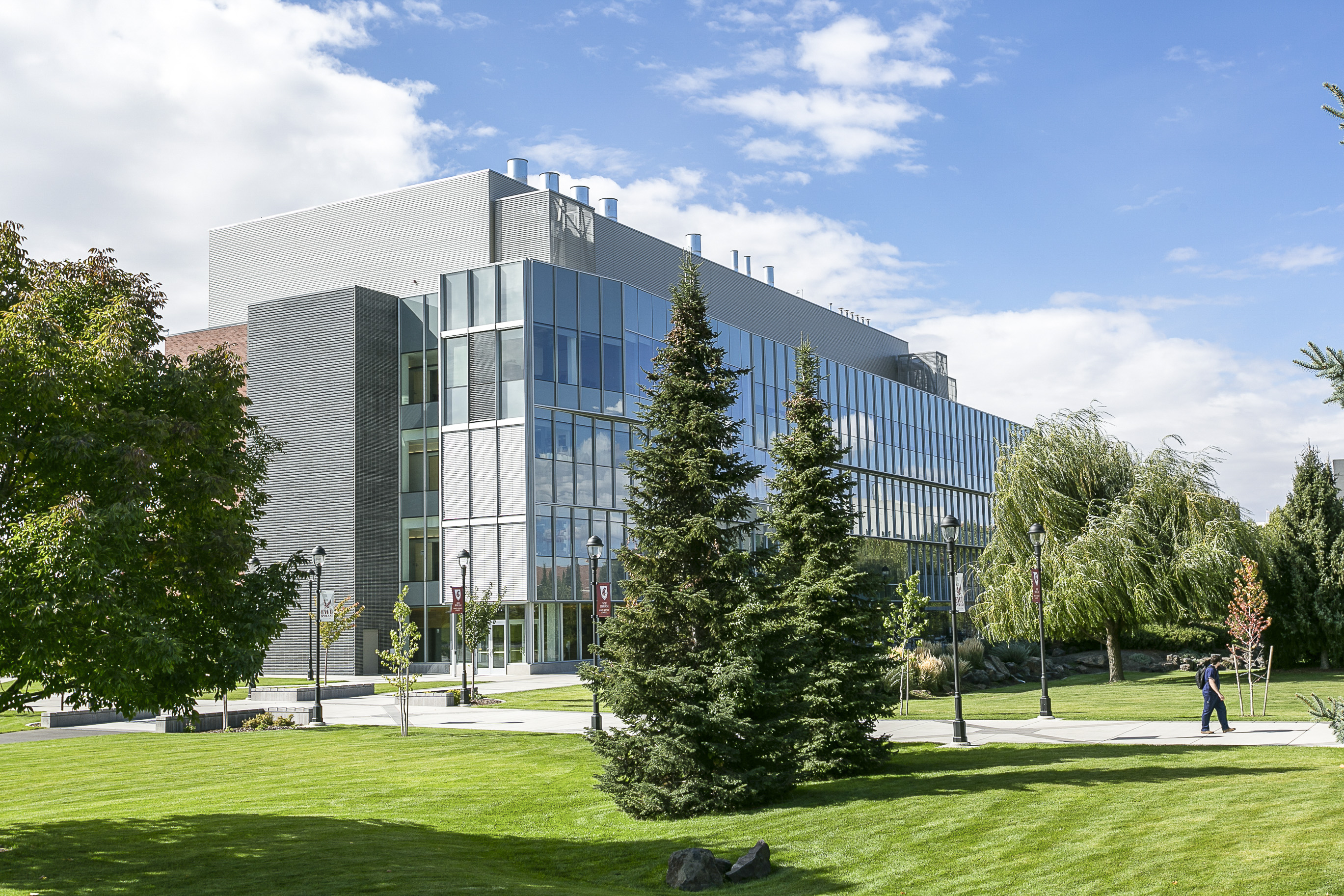
- The Floyd College of Medicine is housed at the WSU Health Sciences campus in Spokane, pictured here in 2015.
- Type: Public medical school
- Established: 2015
- Parent institution: Washington State University
- Dean: James M. Record
- Academic staff: 260
- Location: Spokane, Washington, U.S. 47.661°N 117.406°W
- Website: medicine.wsu.edu
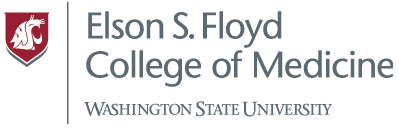

The Elson S. Floyd College of Medicine is a public medical school headquartered in Spokane, Washington. Founded in 2015, it is part of Washington State University, and is the second public medical school in the state of Washington. It welcomed its inaugural class in the fall of 2017, joining the University of Washington and Pacific Northwest University of Health Sciences as one of three medical schools in the state.

== History ==
The Washington State University School of Medicine was established by the WSU board of regents in 2015, after the state legislature amended a 1917 statute that gave the University of Washington in Seattle the exclusive right as a public institution to grant degrees in medicine in the state.

The creation of a medical school at Washington State University was opposed by the University of Washington; both WSU and UW issued contradictory reports in 2014 as to the viability of a second public medical school in the state. The increasingly acrimonious debate between the two institutions was described as a "feud" in media reports and state senator Andy Hill chastised the two schools for forcing the legislature to "become the parent in this dispute." Confusion created by the unexpected resignation of UW president Michael K. Young, however, largely muted the University of Washington's opposition to the project.

In July 2015, the board of regents announced their intention to name the medical school after the late WSU president Elson Floyd; the name was officially changed to the Elson S. Floyd College of Medicine that September. After a national search, Dr. John Tomkowiak was selected as dean.

In February 2016, the Liaison Committee on Medical Education (LCME) granted the school candidate status, the first in a multistep process toward accreditation. In October 2016, Washington State University announced that the LCME had granted preliminary accreditation to the school and it achieved full accreditation in June 2021.

In August 2016, the Spokane Teaching Health Clinic on campus opened. It is intended to provide experiential learning to pharmacy and nursing students and was created by a consortium of WSU, Empire Health Foundation, and Providence Health Care to gain support for more federal residency positions in Spokane.

On June 2, 2022, after nearly seven years of leadership, Dr. Tomkowiak stepped down from his role as dean.

== Instruction ==
On August 18, 2017, the school held its white coat ceremony for the inaugural class of 60 students. The school uses a community-based model of medical education, training physicians for the first two years on the WSU Spokane campus, then distributing the class across four regional campuses located in: Everett, Spokane, Tri-Cities, and Vancouver.

In the first two years, students study the foundational sciences for medicine, integrated with the fundamentals of clinical practice.

Students begin their education with a two-week intensive training program; learning the basics of taking patient history, taking vital signs, conducting a physical exam, and other fundamentals clinical skills. After completing the training program, students travel to their assigned regional site to complete the first of three, one-week clinical "intersessions." These clinical experiences are continued at the beginning of every quarter during years one and two, and are also where students will complete their third- and fourth-year clinical clerkships.

After returning to the Spokane campus in the fourth week, students begin their first curriculum block, anatomy and histology. Students split their time between classroom instruction, cadaver lab, and self-directed learning through weekly small group case-based-learning sessions.

Not far from the WSU Spokane campus, Sacred Heart Medical Center has long had a relationship with the WSU College of Pharmacy and as clinical partner it hosts a residency program that offers a teaching certificate.

=== Leadership certificate ===
In addition to the Doctor of Medicine degree, graduates of the school will also receive a graduate certificate in Leadership, reflecting the school's integration of non-medical management coursework into its curriculum.

== See also ==
- List of medical schools in the United States
- WWAMI Regional Medical Education Program
- University of Washington School of Medicine
