= Burrell College of Health Sciences =

Medical school of New Mexico State University

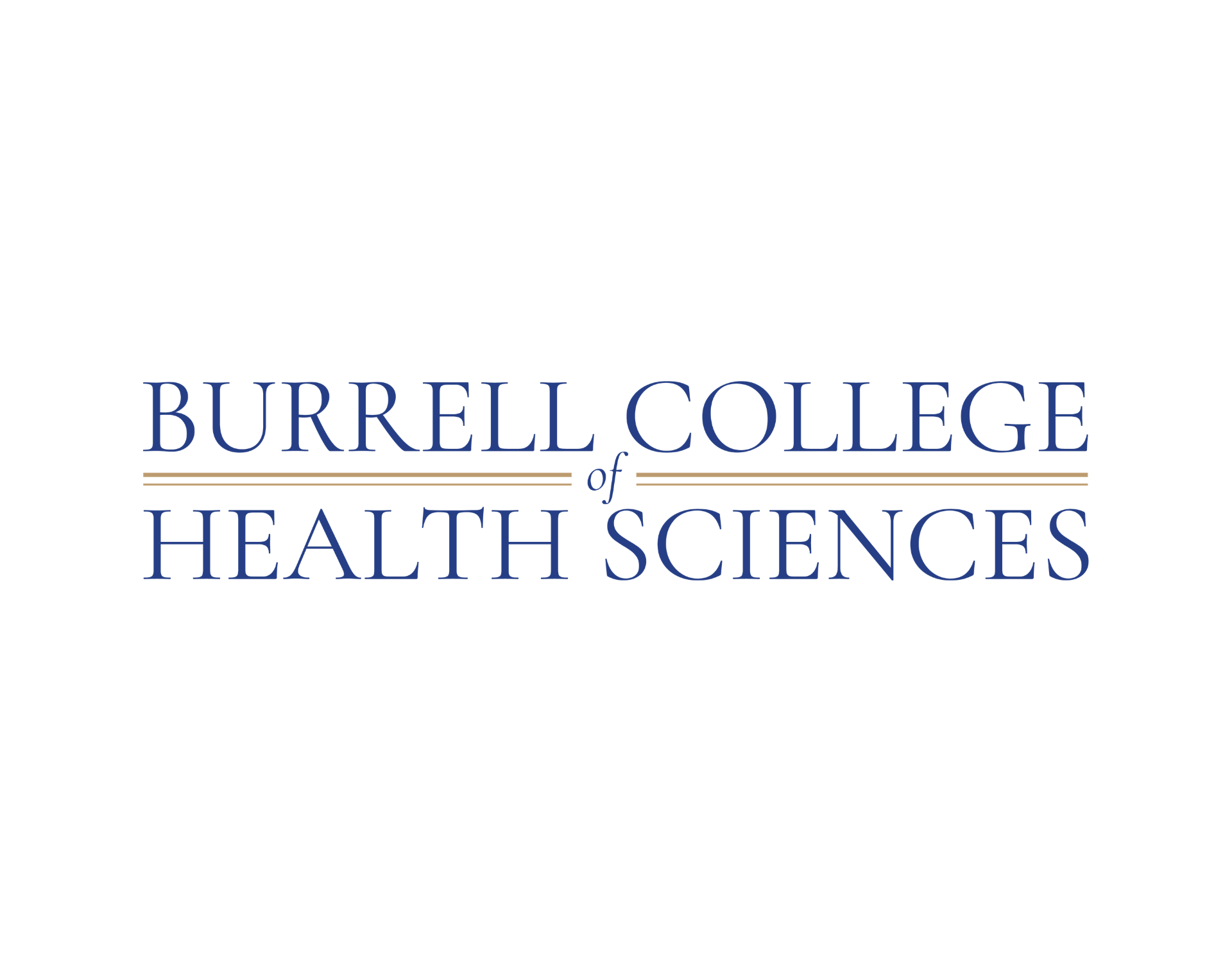
- Motto: Para la gente y el futuro!
- Motto in English: For the people and the future
- Type: Private, for-profit medical school
- Established: 2013
- Affiliations: Florida Institute of Technology, New Mexico State University
- President: John L. Hummer
- Dean: William Pieratt
- Dean (Florida): Doris Newman
- Location: Las Cruces, New Mexico and Melbourne Florida, United States; 32.2758°N 106.7478°W
- Campus: Urban, 50 acres (20 ha)
- Colors: Blue; Gold
- Mascot: Bear
- Website: burrell.edu

The Burrell College of Health Sciences is a private, for-profit medical school. The main campus is located on the New Mexico State University (NMSU) campus in Las Cruces, New Mexico, and their second campus is located on the Florida Institute of Technology (FIT) campus in Melbourne, Florida. It is accredited by the American Osteopathic Association's Commission on Osteopathic College Accreditation and graduated its first class in May 2020.

== History ==
The Burrell College of Health Sciences at New Mexico State University was founded in 2013, at a cost of $85 million. The Burrell College of Health Sciences was envisioned by its founding dean, George Mychaskiw, to address the shortage of physicians in the Southwestern United States and its border with Northern Mexico, as well as to diversify the physician workforce. Mychaskiw reached out to John Hummer, a New Mexico business and healthcare leader, for his assistance in pursuing this vision. Mychaskiw and Hummer formed a partnership and met with NMSU in July 2013 and incorporated a new legal entity, The New Mexico College of Osteopathic Medicine, that would eventually be named the Burrell College of Health Sciences. NMSU Chancellor Garrey Carruthers supported their vision for the creation of a private/public affiliated osteopathic medical school in Las Cruces, New Mexico. In 2014, the Burrell family joined the college after its founding, providing the initial seed capital.

The college was founded as a for-profit school in partnership with New Mexico State University. Burrell was granted applicant status in 2012 by the American Osteopathic Association, and ultimately received provisional accreditation in July 2015. Burrell College of Health Sciences began its first courses in August 2016. Don N. Peska became interim dean and chief academic officer in 2018 and was succeeded by William Pieratt as the new dean in 2020.

As of 2015, the school had received over $110 million from private investors. Burrell is the first osteopathic medical school in New Mexico and the second medical school in the state.

On May 8, 2020, the inaugural class of 2020 graduated, earning the Doctor of Osteopathic Medicine degree.

As of June 2026, Burrell College of Osteopathic Medicine is officially Burrell College of Health Sciences. This new name reflects the College’s expanding academic vision to provide healthcare professionals in underserved communities. As part of this transition, Burrell College of Health Sciences is now organized into two schools: School of Osteopathic Medicine (BCSOM) and School of Health Professions (BCSHP). The School of Osteopathic Medicine will remain focused on Doctor of Osteopathic Medicine (D.O.) degrees. The first degree offered under the School of Health Professions will be a Master of Health Science in Anesthesia, or MHSA, program. Other degree programs are in development.

== Academics ==
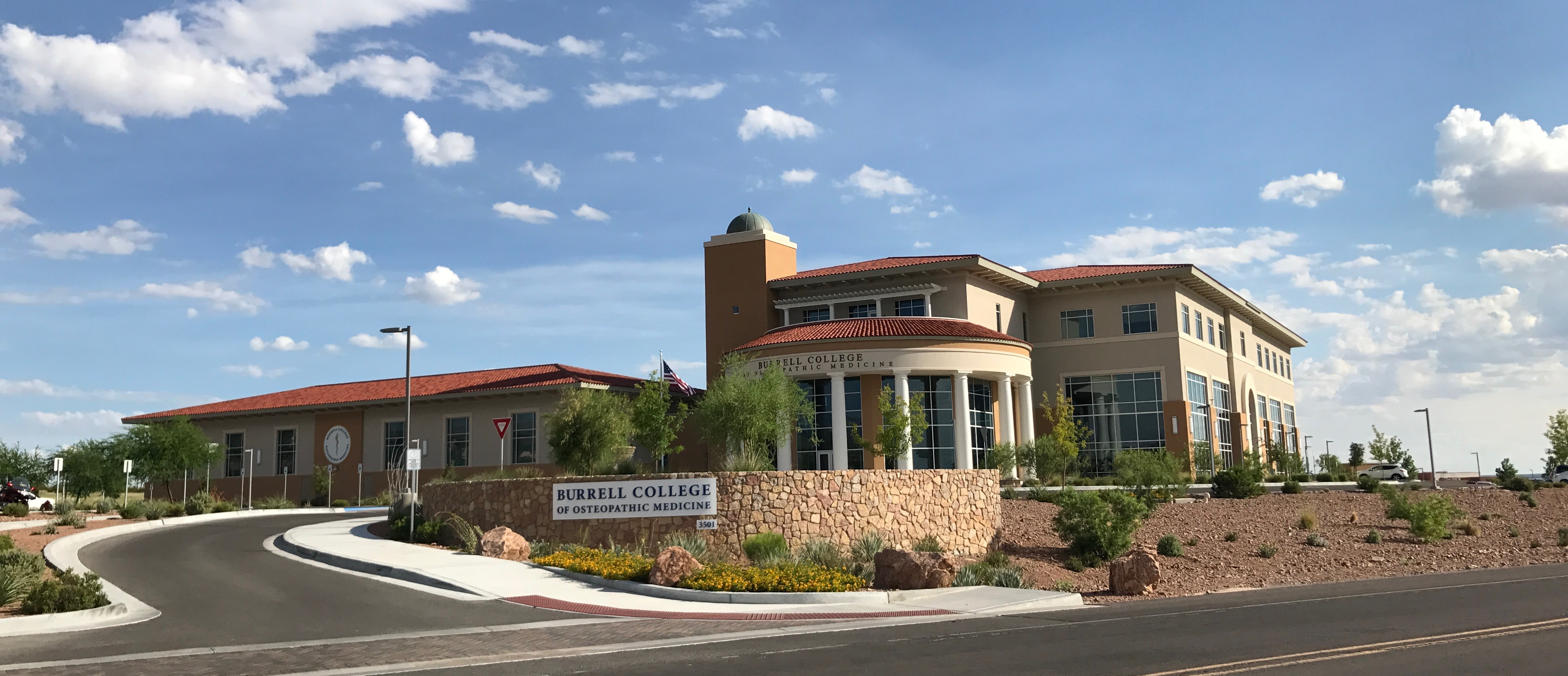
Burrell College of Osteopathic Medicine

Burrell offers the Doctor of Osteopathic Medicine (DO) degree. Years 1 and 2 of the DO program consist primarily of classroom-based learning, with students completing clinical clerkships during years 3 and 4 at one of five primary sites: Las Cruces, Albuquerque, Eastern New Mexico, El Paso, Texas, or Tucson, Arizona. As of 2021 clinical clerkship sites also include: Four Corners primarily in New Mexico and Melbourne, Florida.

== Honor Societies ==
Burrell College has honor societies active on its campus including Sigma Sigma Phi, Gold Humanism Honor Society, and Omega Beta Iota.

== Campus ==
Burrell's main campus consists of a newly constructed 80,000 square foot, three story building located in the Arrowhead Research Park on the NMSU campus which is located next to the New Mexico State University (NMSU) football stadium. Students may access all of the campus facilities and resources at NMSU, and may opt to live in student housing. The school is located around an hour away from White Sands National Park and Spaceport America.

== Graduate medical education ==
Burrell has facilitated the opening of over 100 new graduate medical education (GME) residency positions in family medicine, internal medicine, orthopedic surgery, and osteopathic neuromusculoskeletal medicine (ONMM). The orthopedic surgery residency closed in 2020.

== See also ==
- List of medical schools in the United States
