= Orlando College of Osteopathic Medicine =

Osteopathic medical school in Orlando, Florida, U.S.

Coordinates: 28.4592°N 81.637°W

- Other names: OCOM
- Type: Private for-profit medical school
- Established: 2024
- Dean: Robert Hasty
- Doctoral students: 97
- Location: Winter Garden, Florida, US
- Campus: 25 acre
- Website: ocom.org

The Orlando College of Osteopathic Medicine (OCOM) is a private for-profit medical school in Winter Garden, Florida. The school holds pre-accreditation by the American Osteopathic Association's Commission on Osteopathic College Accreditation (COCA). Graduates of the college receive a Doctor of Osteopathic Medicine degree (D.O.).

== History ==
In July 2022, construction began on the school's campus. In 2023, the school received pre-accreditation by the American Osteopathic Association's Commission on Osteopathic College Accreditation (COCA). Graduates of the college receive a Doctor of Osteopathic Medicine degree (D.O.).

In April 2025, OCOM launched its own peer-reviewed publication, Academic Osteopathic Medicine, led by the OCOM research department.

== Campus ==
OCOM is located on a 25-acre campus. The main building was designed by Baker Barrios Architects and consists of three floors and 144,000 square feet.

The campus houses a non-profit organization, the Dr. Kiran C. Patel Institute for Graduate Medical Education.

== Academics ==
Students at Orlando College of Osteopathic Medicine will take basic science classes in the first two years of medical school and complete clinical clerkships during their third and fourth years. The inaugural class will consist of 97 students.

== See also ==
- List of medical schools in the United States
