= University of Georgia School of Medicine =

Medical school in Athens, Georgia, U.S.

- Type: Public medical school
- Established: 2024; 2 years ago
- Parent institution: University of Georgia
- Dean: Shelley Nuss
- Faculty: 22
- Students: 64
- Location: Athens, Georgia, US; 33.9637°N 83.40362°W
- Website: medicine.uga.edu

The University of Georgia School of Medicine is a public medical school that is a school of the University of Georgia, located on the university's 56-acre Health Sciences Campus in Athens, Georgia, United States. Shelley Nuss, MD, MACP serves as the school's founding dean. The school received authorization from the University System of Georgia Board of Regents in February 2024 to operate as an independent school of medicine.

== History ==
The AU/UGA Medical Partnership, a collaborative program between Augusta University's Medical College of Georgia and the University of Georgia, established a regional medical campus in Athens in 2010, initially educating 40 students per class. Enrollment expanded to 60 students per class during the tenure of Shelley Nuss as campus dean, a position she held beginning in 2016.

The University System of Georgia Board of Regents voted for the University of Georgia to have its own, independent, medical school on February 13, 2024, and the former partnership ended. The MD degree curriculum subsequently received formal approval from the University of Georgia's University Council on September 18, 2024, followed by approval from the Board of Regents on November 12, 2024.

== Campus and Facilities ==
The School of Medicine is located on the university's 56 acre Health Sciences Campus in Athens, Georgia, which first opened in 2012. A new $100 million medical education and research facility is under construction on the campus, scheduled for completion in December 2026 and designed to support a future class size of up to 120 students.

== Academics and Accreditation ==
The school confers the Doctor of Medicine (MD) degree. The inaugural class, entering in Fall 2026, enrolled 64 students. The class average MCAT score is 514 (89th percentile), and average GPA is 3.85. The school has a student to faculty ratio of three-to-one.

The Liaison Committee on Medical Education (LCME) granted the school preliminary accreditation on February 13, 2026, allowing the university to recruit and admit its inaugural class.
