= AdventHealth University =

Seventh-day Adventist college in Orlando, Florida, US

- Seal of AdventHealth University
- Former names: Florida Hospital College of Health Sciences (1992–2012); Adventist University of Health Sciences (2012–2019)
- Type: Private
- Established: 1992; 34 years ago
- Accreditation: SACS, AOTA
- Affiliations: AdventHealth
- Religious affiliation: Seventh-day Adventist Church
- Academic affiliations: NAICU • ICUF
- Endowment: $11.2 million USD (2023)
- President: C. Josef Ghosn
- Provost: Karen Benn Marshall
- Academic staff: 296 (fall 2023)
- Students: 1,692 (spring 2025)
- Undergraduates: 1,221 (spring 2025)
- Postgraduates: 471 (spring 2025)
- Location: Orlando, Florida, United States; 28°34′35″N 81°22′3″W
- Campus: Large city, 9 acres (3.6 ha)
- Other campuses: Tampa; Denver
- Colors: Dark blue, light blue, dark green, and light green
- Website: ahu.edu

AdventHealth University (AHU) is a private health sciences university in Orlando, Florida, United States. It is affiliated with the Seventh-day Adventist Church and the AdventHealth hospital system, a network of faith-based healthcare facilities. The university also operates campuses in Tampa and Denver. AHU offers more than 20 programs at the associate, bachelor's, master's, professional's and doctoral degrees, including online and certificate options. AHU has published 209 scientific papers on many different subjects.

In 2022, AdventHealth University was designated by the United States Department of Education a Hispanic-Serving Institution.

== Early history ==
AHU traces its origins to a nursing program started in 1913 at Florida Sanitarium (now AdventHealth Orlando). In 1983, a two-year associate degree in nursing began under the sponsorship of Southern College (now Southern Adventist University). Plans to establish a standalone institution began in 1990, led by hospital chaplain David Greenlaw, who became the founding president.

== 1992–2019 ==
In 1992, Florida Hospital College of Health Sciences was founded. On November 10, 1995, FHCHS became accrediated by the Joint Review Committee on Education in Radiologic Technology. On January 1, 1996, it became accrediated by the Southern Association of Colleges and Schools. On September 22, 1997, it became accrediated by the Accreditation Commission for Education in Nursing On October 10, 2003, it became accrediated by the Joint Review Committee on Educational Programs in Nuclear Medicine. On October 11, 2007, it became accrediated by the Council on Accrediation of Nurse Anesthesia Educational Programs. In 2012, Florida Hospital College of Health Sciences changed its name to Adventist University of Health Sciences. On April 27, 2013, AUHS became accrediated by American Occupational Therapy Association and the Accreditation Council for Occupational Therapy Education. On January 2, 2019, Adventist University of Health Sciences rebranded to AdventHealth University.

== 2022–present ==
In October 2022, it partnered with Full Sail University to open a technology laboratory for healthcare education. In December 2023, AdventHealth partnered with Orlando College of Osteopathic Medicine to train physicians to keep them in the Orlando metropolitan area. Students from the new college will be able to work at AdventHealth hospitals; AdventHealth employees and AHU students will be able to take courses at OCOM. And when OCOM opened in 2024, many of its faculty were physicians from AdventHealth.

In April 2024, AHU demolition began on a behavioral building, and construction began in June at the site for a simulation center. In September 2026, the 62,000 square foot (5,800 m^{2}) nurses simulation center opened.

In late October 2024, the university began to offer certificates to high school students. The following month, AdventHealth University Tampa opened. In 2025, Howell Construction expanded AdventHealth University Denver in Greenwood Village, Colorado for $5 million. The Colorado campus is in the same building as AdventHealth Rocky Mountain Region.

== Statistics ==
=== Ranking ===
By EduRank in March 2025, the university is #6,459 of 14,131 on earth; #1,785 of 2,597 in North America; #1,698 of 2496 in the United States; #69 of 109 in Florida; #3 of 6 in Orlando and #4,706 of 4,826 for surgery.

=== Money ===
At the four year university the average annual cost is $31,885, and the median earnings of former students is $72,282.

=== Ratio ===
The acceptance rate at the university is 100%. The graduation rate at the university is 55%, and the student loan rate is 55%. 40% of the students are full-time, and 60% of the students are part-time. The student ratio at the university is: 37% Hispanics, 31% Whites, 17% Blacks, 4% Asians, 3% nonresident alien, 3% two or more races, 1% Hawaiians or other Pacific Islander. While the faculty ratio is: 64% White, 15% Black, 12% Hispanic, 5% Asian and 5% two or more races. The geographic ratio of students is: 87.8% from Florida, 12.22% from another state and 2.17% from another country. The majority of the international students come from Brazil, Jamaica and Bermuda. In 2025, the majority of the students are female with 81% and males are only 19%.

== See also ==
- List of Seventh-day Adventist colleges and universities
- List of Seventh-day Adventist hospitals
