= Medical School Admission Requirements =

Guides about medical schools in America

The Medical School Admission Requirements Guide (MSAR) is a suite of guides produced by the Association of American Medical Colleges (AAMC), which helps inform prospective medical students about medical school, the application process, and the undergraduate preparation. The MSAR staff works in collaboration with the admissions offices at each medical school and combined B.S./M.D. program to compile information about each school and program. This data originates from a number of sources including the:

- AAMC Data Warehouse,
- Graduation Questionnaire (GQ),
- Liaison Committee on Medical Education (LCME) surveys, and
- AAMC Tuition and Student Fees Survey.

MSAR products are for sale on the AAMC’s web site, but also college book stores, Barnes and Noble.com and Amazon.com

== History ==
The last edition of the MSAR was printed in 1947, and it was called the “Handbook for Advisors to Students Planning to Enter Medicine.”

Since then, the MSAR has been published annually as a print guidebook for prospective medical students. The book was traditionally divided into two sections: information for entering class and school profiles. Originally, information centered around the application process (interviews, MCAT, letters of reference), but it later grew to include information about admissions decisions, diversity in medical schools, financing a medical education, deciding upon a career in medicine, and how undergraduate students can prepare for medical school.

The school profile section contained information on General Information, the school’s mission, curricular highlights, selection factors, financial aid, information on diversity programs, campus setting, enrollment, special features, Regional and Satellite campuses and the application process. The 2000-2001 edition was the Special 50th Edition of the MSAR.

The 2012-2013 edition of the MSAR was published as a guidebook and web site called MSAR Online. With this change, extensive school profile information was moved into an online format where students could compare information in a more accessible format. A condensed, one page version of the school profile was kept as part of the printed book. The MSAR Online site includes functions for advanced searches, data sorting, school browsing at a glance, saving favorites, comparing schools and a notes feature.

Today, three versions of the MSAR are available: a printed guide book, MSAR Online, and an e-reader. In the first six months after launching the MSAR and Medical School Directory was viewed by users in 162 countries.

== MSAR Print Guidebook ==
The MSAR guidebook is one of three MSAR products. It includes chapters with information about undergraduate course selection, taking the MCAT, applying to medical school, the AMCAS application, how admission decisions are made, financing a medical education, medical school diversity information, and how to choose the best school for you. This information is collected annually from schools and programs, and a range of data sources including:

- AAMC Data Warehouse,
- Graduation Questionnaire (GQ),
- Liaison Committee on Medical Education (LCME) surveys, and
- AAMC Tuition and Student Fees Survey.

== MSAR Online ==
The MSAR Online allows users to perform advanced searches, sort data, browse schools at a glance, save favorites, compare schools, save notes, and access additional data not printed in the paper version of the guidebook. The MSAR Online provides profiles of each LCME-accredited US medical school, Canadian medical schools, and combined BS/MD programs. Each medical school profile includes over 100 pieces of information and data including:

- MCAT and GPA data,
- Medical school class profiles,
- Education costs and financial aid packages,
- M.D./Ph.D. and other combined degree programs,
- Data on applicant volunteer and research experiences,
- Graduates’ specialty choices,
- Commitment to primary care,
- Global health experience participation,
- Affiliated hospitals, and
- Research opportunities.

The MSAR Online recently debuted the “My Notes” feature, which allows users to write, save, edit and print messages regarding specific schools for future reference. Each user can view their own notes and print them to bring to advising sessions, campus tours, or interviews.

A public version of the site, The Medical School Directory, is available to all site visitors. It features a list of medical schools as well as some school and program information.

== Student Surveys ==
Results from the 2010 Pre-MCAT Questionnaire show medical school aspirants ranked the MSAR highest in value compared to other information sources for help in making crucial application decisions.
