= Dr. Kiran C. Patel College of Allopathic Medicine =

Florida medical school

Coordinates: 26.0817°N 80.2498°W

Nova Southeastern University Dr. Kiran C. Patel College of Allopathic Medicine (NSU MD)
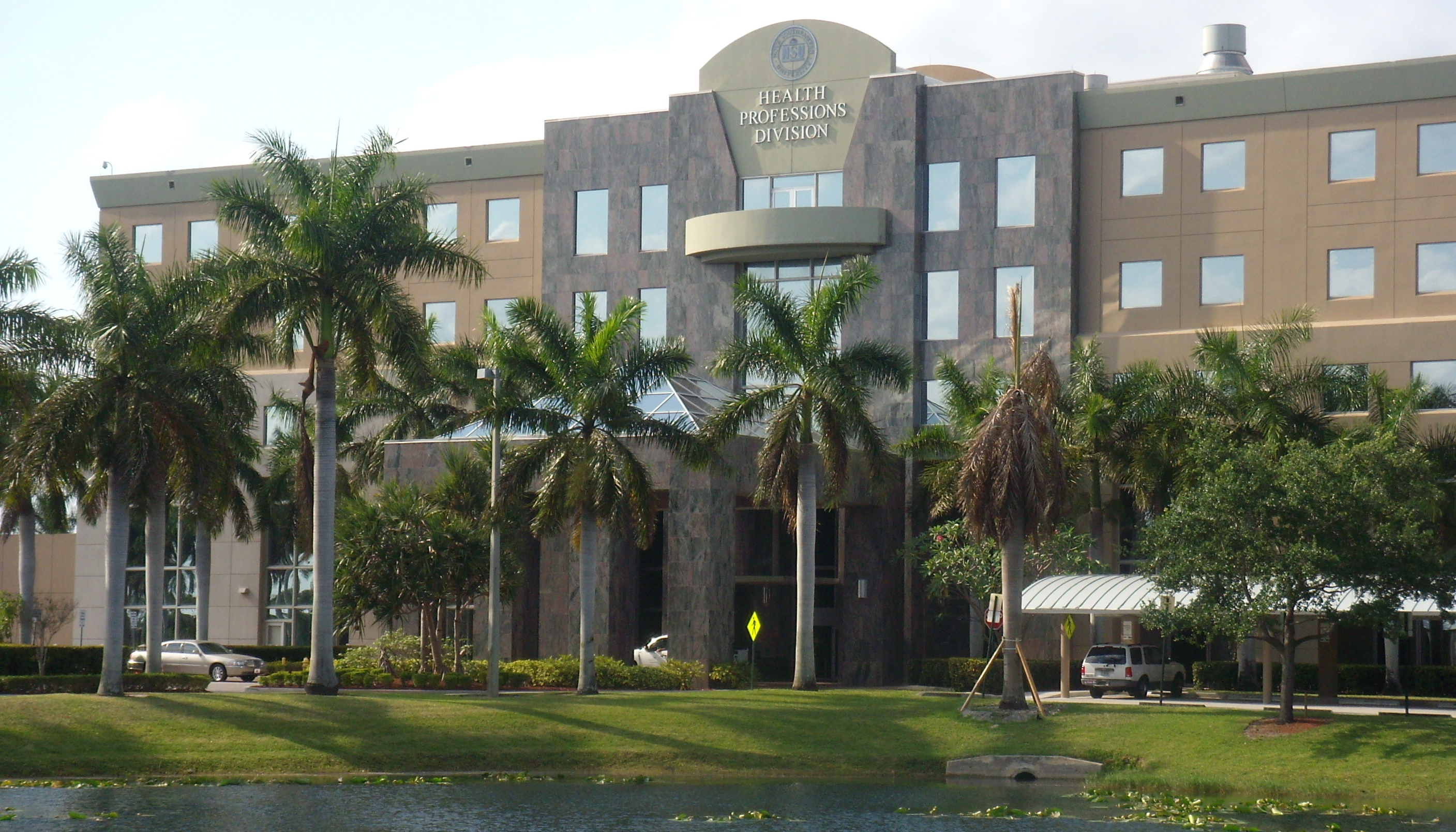
- Terry Building, home of the Dr. Kiran C. Patel College of Allopathic Medicine administration
- Type: Private medical school
- Established: 2018
- Dean: Chad Perlyn, M.D., Ph.D., M.B.A.
- Academic staff: 300
- Students: 200
- Location: Davie, Florida, United States
- Campus: Urban
- Website: https://md.nova.edu/

Nova Southeastern University Dr. Kiran C. Patel College of Allopathic Medicine (NSU MD) is a private, not-for-profit, medical school in Davie, Florida. The medical school was founded in 2018 and became Florida's 8th, and the nation's 148th, fully-accredited medical school in 2023.

== Academics ==
The medical college offers a single medical degree (M.D.), the Doctor of Medicine along with a Master of Biomedical Sciences (MBS). The medical college graduated its charter class of 46 students in 2022. The charter class achieved a 100% residency match rate with 40% choosing to remain in Florida.

== Clinical affiliations ==
The medical college conducts clinical rotations at HCA East Florida division along with other hospitals nearby Davie with the exception of Nemours Children Hospital in Orlando.

== See also ==
- List of medical schools in the United States
