= Guy's Hill High School =

Location
- Guy's Hill, Saint Catherine Parish; Jamaica
- Coordinates: 18.249224°N 76.988277°W

Information
- School type: Secondary School
- Motto: Courage, Energy, Patience - the Key to Success
- Established: 1971
- School code: 14119
- Principal: Mr. Cecil Donald
- Teaching staff: 56 (as of 2008-09)
- Grades: 7 - 13
- Gender: Co-ed
- Age range: 12-20
- Enrolment: 1,160 (as of 2008-09)
- Student to teacher ratio: 24 (as of 2008-09)
- Hours in school day: 6 1/2
- Houses: Needham, Hay, Soarses & Pasley
- Colours: Blue, Yellow, White

Guy's Hill High School is a secondary school in the village of Guy's Hill, Saint Catherine, Jamaica. Established in 1971, the school serves students twelve to twenty years of age.

== History ==
The school first opened its doors in 1971 as a Junior Secondary School with an enrolment of 670 students in grades 7 through 9. The school had as its first principal Miss Ada L. Osbourne with an academic staff of 17 teachers operating a straight day system. With the implementation of a new level of the educational system, grade 10 programs were introduced. In order to adequately accommodate the flow of students, the school adopted the shift system. With the rapid growth and development of the school in the North–East St. Catherine region it became necessary to change the name to Guy's Hill New Secondary School.

As the grade ten programmes expanded, a two-year skills training programme was implemented and grade 11 was added. These skills were carpentry and joinery, needlework, food and nutrition, electrical installation, childcare, art and craft, and life Ssills. It became relevant at this point in the life of the institution to introduce the work experience programme. This created an on- the-job training within the private and public existence. One of the positives of the work experience is that it is often the source of employment for the students upon graduating.

In 1977 the school once again change its name to Guy's Hill Secondary School. In 1988 the first batch of schools to be upgraded to high school included the school and the school name was changed to the Guy's Hill High School. During the same year an inaugural set of common entrance students were placed in the school.

== Campus ==
Guy's Hill is located in the Cool Hills of St. Catherine bordering the two parishes of St. Mary and St Ann. The school's boundaries span all three parishes.

== Curriculum ==
Guy's Hill High School now offers courses in the areas of the Arts, Sciences, Business, Information Technology, Home Economics, Industrial Technology, Agriculture, Cosmetology, Music, Visual and Theatre Arts, and Electrical Installation. In 2014, our course offerings were broadened to include subjects at the CAPE level, including among others, Physical Education, Chemistry, Entrepreneurship and Electrical Technology.

== Former principals ==
- Miss Ada L. Osbourne (1971–1986)
- Mrs. Hyacinth Baker (1986–1995)
- Mr. Timothy Bailey (1995–2008)
- Mr. Irvin Small (2008–2012)
- Ms. Joan Davis (2012–Present)
