= Noorda College of Osteopathic Medicine =

Medical school in Utah

- Type: Private, For-profit
- Established: 2019
- President: Norman S Wright, PhD
- Dean: Lynsey Drew, DO
- Location: Provo, Utah, US; 40°12′42″N 111°39′21″W
- Campus: 21 acres
- Colors: Copper, Alpine White, Granite Gray, Twilight purple
- Nickname: Noorda-COM
- Mascot: Gnomes
- Website: noorda.edu

The Noorda College of Osteopathic Medicine is a private, for-profit medical school for osteopathic medicine located in the city of Provo in the U.S. state of Utah. It is the third medical school in the state, and the second school of osteopathic medicine.

== History ==
The college was founded in 2019. In July 2020, the college received accreditation approval to begin recruiting students. The school was named "Noorda College of Osteopathic Medicine" to recognized the Ray and Tye Noorda Foundation, which provided $50 million in funding to found the school.

== Academics ==
Noorda-COM offers the Doctor of Osteopathic Medicine (DO), as well as a dual DO/MBA program in conjunction with Utah Valley University. Like many other medical schools in the United States, Noorda-COM students will take basic science courses in the first two years of medical school, and move on to clinical clerkships during their third and fourth years. The school plans to enroll 90 students (50% capacity) during its first year, 135 (75% capacity) during its second year, 180 (100% capacity) during its third year, and 194 students each year thereafter (the additional students past 180 are allowed to account for attrition).

== Campus ==
The college is located on a 21-acre campus, acquired from a neighboring golf course. Groundbreaking for the campus began in 2019. Campus plans include a 685,000 square feet building with 685 units of multi-family housing, and 234,000 square feet of parking structures. Cost of construction is projected $65 million.

== See also ==
- List of medical schools in the United States
