= Arkansas College of Osteopathic Medicine =

Private medical school in Fort Smith, Arkansas

- Motto: Aletheuo, Epignosis, Therapeia "To be truthful, knowledgeable, and caring"
- Type: Private medical school
- Established: 2017
- Dean: Christopher Loyke
- Students: 600
- Location: Fort Smith, Arkansas, United States; 35.3080°N 94.3273°W
- Campus: Rural, 542 acres (219 ha)
- Website: arcom.achehealth.edu

The Arkansas College of Osteopathic Medicine (ARCOM) is a private medical school in Fort Smith, Arkansas. It is the founding program of the Arkansas Colleges of Health Education and is accredited by the Commission on Osteopathic College Accreditation.

== History ==
The school opened its doors to its inaugural class of 150 students in August 2017. The first class graduated in May 2021 with a Doctor of Osteopathic Medicine degree.

== Campus ==
The campus of ARCOM is located on 542 acres in Fort Smith, Arkansas. The main building, a three-story 102,000 ft.² facility, began construction in March 2015, with construction costs estimated at $32.4 million. The ACHE campus has grown to include student housing, restaurants, retail, fitness center, and a 12-acre park with a playground and walking trail. Future growth includes more student housing, a grocery store, and a daycare center.

== Academics ==
ARCOM confers the Doctor of Osteopathic Medicine degree.

== See also ==
- List of medical schools in the United States
