= Kansas Health Science University =

Medical school in Kansas, USA

- Type: Private medical school
- Established: 2022
- Accreditation: WSCUC
- President: Kim Long, Ph.D.
- Dean: Eric Gish, D.O.
- Location: Wichita, Kansas, United States; 37.6853°N 97.3360°W
- Campus: Urban
- Website: kansashsu.org

The Kansas Health Science University (also known as KHSU) is a private university in Wichita, Kansas. The university is home to the Kansas College of Osteopathic Medicine (KansasCOM), the first Osteopathic School in Kansas.

== History ==
The University was originally established in 2019, with the first of D.O. class starting in August of 2022. The school opened in the former Finney State Office Building in downtown Wichita. In July 2024, the institution changed its name from Kansas Health Science Center to Kansas Health Science University to reflect its growth and plans to expand into additional health care disciplines and degree programs beyond osteopathic medicine.

== Academics ==
=== Kansas College of Osteopathic Medicine ===
The Kansas College of Osteopathic Medicine (KansasCOM) is a college within Kansas Health Science University that offers a four-year Doctor of Osteopathic Medicine (D.O.) degree.

The college is accredited with warning by the Commission on Osteopathic College Accreditation (COCA).
