= Edward Via College of Osteopathic Medicine =

American osteopathic medical school

- Former name: Edward Via Virginia College of Osteopathic Medicine
- Type: Private medical school
- Established: 2001
- President: Dixie Tooke-Rawlins
- Provost: Deborah West
- Students: 2,592
- Location: Virginia Tech (main campus), Blacksburg, Virginia, Spartanburg, South Carolina, Auburn, Alabama, Monroe, Louisiana, Bluefield, Virginia, United States; 37.1989°N 80.4060°W
- Colors: Maroon (Pantone 208) and Orange (Pantone 158)
- Website: www.vcom.edu
- Location within Shenandoah Valley Location within Virginia Location within the United States

The Edward Via College of Osteopathic Medicine (VCOM) is a private osteopathic medical school on the campus of Virginia Tech in Blacksburg, Virginia. Founded in 2002, VCOM graduated its first class of 139 students in June 2007. VCOM grants Doctor of Osteopathic Medicine degrees (DO) and is accredited by the American Osteopathic Association's Commission on Osteopathic College Accreditation.

VCOM has branch campuses in Spartanburg, South Carolina; Auburn, Alabama; Monroe, Louisiana; and Bluefield, Virginia. As of 2026, according to U.S. News & World Report, VCOM has a total enrollment of 2,592 students and an acceptance rate of 16.5 percent.

== History ==
The school was founded in 2001 when Virginia Tech and the Harvey W. Peters Research Foundation worked together to start up a new private school of osteopathic medicine, and it was formally incorporated in September of that year. The foundation had been funded by the philanthropist Marion Bradley Via, who died in 1993. Her sons, Peter and Edward, inherited her estate, and the latter was a major supporter of the foundation and an advocate for the establishment of a medical school in southwest Virginia. The resulting college, the Edward Via Virginia College of Osteopathic Medicine (VCOM), was named in his honor. At the time, it was the 20th osteopathic medical school in the country, and the fourth medical school in the state. As the school was not connected with a healthcare system, it sought out affiliations with hospitals for its students' clinical training. Carilion Clinic showed early interest in being a partner. Zoning for construction of the school was approved by the city council in November 2001, and construction began in February of the following year.

In June 2007, VCOM graduated its inaugural class of 139 students.

VCOM is incorporated as a private, non-profit institution and has a collaborative agreement with Virginia Tech and Auburn University for education, research, and student activities.

In 2010, the school founded its second campus in Spartanburg, South Carolina, with classes starting in September 2011. VCOM-Carolinas graduated its first class in May 2015.

In 2012, the school announced plans to establish a third campus in collaboration with Auburn University in Auburn, Alabama, with classes starting in the fall of 2015.

Medical graduates of VCOM receive a Doctor of Osteopathic Medicine (D.O.) degree and obtain medical licensure by the same boards as graduates with an MD by participating in the same residency programs as their MD peers. The osteopathic curriculum entails additional training in a technique called osteopathic manipulative medicine besides conventional medicine and surgery. While graduates of VCOM may pursue any field of medicine, students typically pursue primary care to serve a rural population.

According to U.S. News & World Report, VCOM was the second-largest medical school in the U.S. in 2021, with a total enrollment of 2,122 students among its four campuses.

== Academics ==
The first and second years of medical school at VCOM are primarily classroom-based and focus on the basic sciences. The school uses a system of "blocks" as opposed to semesters, with eight blocks occurring within the first two years. Each block concerns a specific organ system, incorporating anatomy, physiology, microbiology, pharmacology, pathology, and osteopathic manipulative medicine courses concerning that system. The third and fourth years of training are clinically oriented, where students complete rotations, or clerkships, through various specialties of medicine. While students at VCOM are educated in all basic medical sciences (as are their M.D. counterparts), they also receive approximately 200 extra hours of musculoskeletal/neuromuscular training.

== Patient care ==
VCOM has permanent medical clinics located in Veron, Dominican Republic, Tegucigalpa, Honduras, and El Salvador.

== Campuses ==
VCOM currently operates five campuses: Blacksburg, Carolinas, Auburn, Monroe, and Bluefield.

VCOM-Virginia is located on 13 acres within the campus of Virginia Tech, in the Virginia Tech Corporate Research Center. The college operates within a public/private collaboration with Virginia Tech, sharing resources for education, research, and student activities. On campus, the main building consists of 60,000 square feet. The Center for Simulation and Technology is a 22,000-square-foot building, where training occurs with simulated patient encounters in several specialties.

VCOM-Carolinas is located on the edge of historic downtown Spartanburg, South Carolina. The building is approximately 70,000 square feet and is situated on an 18-acre campus. Facility features include a state-of-the-art anatomy lab and the Center for Simulation and Technology, offering standardized patient and manikin-based simulation education.

VCOM-Auburn is a 100,000-square-foot, four-story, state-of-the-art building situated on 16 acres located on the Auburn University Campus, in Auburn, Alabama. The campus offers the nurturing feel of a small private college, with access to the resources and activities of a larger university community. The collaborative partnership with Auburn University offers student activities, events, research, and the arts.

VCOM-Louisiana, the fourth VCOM campus, is a 100,000-square-foot, $31 million building on the campus of University of Louisiana at Monroe. It was completed in the spring of 2020. Between 150 and 162 medical students enrolled in the fall of 2020.

Bluefield University merged with VCOM in March 2020. It is a Baptist liberal arts college located in Bluefield, Virginia.

== Relationship with host institutions ==
The Virginia Campus is located in the Corporate Research Center, adjacent to the Virginia Tech campus. As part of a long-term agreement, students are granted the same benefits as Virginia Tech students in terms of use of the library, recreational facilities, student center, arts and theatre programs, intramural programs, and access to Virginia Tech football and other athletic event tickets. The school features Tech's "Hokie Bird" mascot as its own, but the school is private and receives no state support from Virginia. Additionally, the official medical school of Virginia Tech is the Virginia Tech Carilion School of Medicine and Research Institute granting the M.D. degree, which is located on Virginia Tech's Roanoke, Virginia campus.

The Carolinas Campus, until 2014, had a similar relationship with the private Wofford College, but currently participates in the "College Town Consortium" with five other local colleges. The annual White Coat Ceremony for first-year medical students is held at nearby Converse College.

The Auburn Campus is located in the Auburn Research Park in Auburn, Alabama, and has a partnership with Auburn University. The partnership is similar to that of Virginia Tech; students can use nearby facilities, but the schools are separate entities. The campus started offering classes in the fall of 2015.

Academic Sports and Osteopathic Medicine, in Blacksburg, Virginia, are affiliated with VCOM-Virginia.

In 2017, VCOM–Carolinas planned to open Northside direct primary care, a college-affiliated clinic located on campus in Spartanburg, South Carolina. The clinic would be operated in part by Palmetto Proactive and staffed by VCOM faculty physicians.

== Graduate medical education ==
VCOM operates three fellowship programs, geriatric medicine, sports medicine, and osteopathic neuromusculoskeletal medicine. All programs are accredited by the American Osteopathic Association. In addition, VCOM operates a residency program in family medicine in collaboration with Johnston Memorial Hospital.

== Research ==
VCOM conducts multidisciplinary research in biomedical, clinical, and community-based settings. Specific areas of research include sports medicine, concussion and brain trauma, primary care, osteopathic manipulative medicine, and infectious disease. Supported by the Bradley Foundation, VCOM amplified its research in cancer, heart, and neurological diseases, as well as bioinformatics and primary care, by creating the Center for Bioinformatics and Genetics and the Primary Care Research Network. Funding for new research projects is provided in part by competitive internal funding programs, including the Research Eureka Accelerator Program and the One Health Program.
