= Burnett School of Medicine =

Medical school of Texas Christian University

Coordinates: 32.7096°N 97.3640°W

Texas Christian University Anne Burnett Marion School of Medicine
- Former names: TCU and UNTHSC School of Medicine (2015–2021), TCU School of Medicine (2021-2022)
- Type: Private medical school
- Established: 2019
- Parent institution: Texas Christian University
- Affiliations: Baylor Scott & White Health; Texas Health Resources; Cook Children's; John Peter Smith Hospital
- Dean: Stuart Flynn, MD
- Location: Fort Worth, Texas
- Campus: Urban
- Website: https://mdschool.tcu.edu/

The Anne Burnett Marion School of Medicine at Texas Christian University, or Burnett School of Medicine at TCU for short (formerly TCU and UNTHSC School of Medicine), is the graduate medical school of Texas Christian University (TCU) located in Fort Worth, Texas. The school welcomed its first class of 60 students in July 2019. It is the sole M.D.-granting institution in Texas that does not use the TMDSAS application system, and instead uses the nation-wide AMCAS system.

== History ==
In July 2015, TCU and the University of North Texas Health Science Center at Fort Worth (UNTHSC) announced their plans to jointly open an allopathic medical school in Fort Worth. The school received preliminary accreditation from the Liaison Committee on Medical Education in October 2018 and welcomed its first class of 60 students in July 2019. TCU maintained accreditation as the degree-granting institution, with faculty and staff employed by the university, while under joint operation and governance with UNTHSC on the university's campus. For the 2020–2021 application cycle there were 8,190 applications for 60 seats.

On January 12, 2022, TCU and UNTHSC announced the end of their joint partnership, with TCU solely responsible for the operation and governance of the renamed TCU School of Medicine. UNTHSC will continue to operate the separate Texas College of Osteopathic Medicine on their Fort Worth campus.

On July 22, 2022, Texas Christian University announced that the TCU School of Medicine would be named the Anne Burnett Marion School of Medicine in honor of the late Anne Burnett Marion’s lifetime of friendship and support and her extraordinary generosity to the TCU School of Medicine. The estate of the late Anne Burnett Marion and The Burnett Foundation, a charitable foundation based in Fort Worth, have made a second $25 million gift to The Anne W. Marion Endowment in support of the TCU School of Medicine operations in perpetuity.

== Teaching Facilities ==
The school's primary education and research facilities were located on the 33-acre UNTHSC campus in the Fort Worth Cultural District, located 3 miles north of the TCU campus, during the joint name time period.

In February of 2022, TCU announced it had acquired land in the medical innovation district of Fort Worth's Near Southside neighborhood, with plans to complete a new 4-story, approximately 100,000 square foot full medical school campus in 2024.

On September 24, 2024, the Burnett School of Medicine at TCU held a dedication for their new medical education building, named Arnold Hall in The Medical Innovation District in Fort Worth. The building was named to honor Ashley and Greg Arnold of Dallas, Texas who made a major gift to establish The Ashley and Greg Arnold Endowment to provide perpetual support for annual operations of the Burnett School of Medicine. The 95,000 square foot building is on a 5.3-acre lot featuring four floors for students, staff and faculty.

The TCU School of Medicine has clinical partnerships with Baylor Scott & White All Saints Medical Center, Baylor Scott & White – Grapevine, Baylor Surgical Hospital at Fort Worth, Cook Children's Health Care System, JPS Health Network, Texas Health Harris Methodist Hospital Alliance Texas Health Fort Worth, and Texas Health Harris Methodist Hospital Southwest Fort Worth.
