= University of the Incarnate Word School of Osteopathic Medicine =

Medical school in San Antonio, Texas

- Other names: UIWSOM
- Type: Private medical school
- Established: 2015
- Parent institution: University of the Incarnate Word
- President: Thomas Evans
- Dean: John T. Pham
- Total staff: 150
- Postgraduates: 648
- Location: San Antonio, Texas, U.S. 29.3498°N 98.4543°W
- Campus: Urban, 23 acres (9.3 ha)
- Mascot: Cardinal
- Website: www.uiw.edu/som/

The University of the Incarnate Word School of Osteopathic Medicine (UIWSOM) is the medical school of the University of the Incarnate Word, a private Catholic university with its main campus in San Antonio and Alamo Heights, Texas. It was opened in 2015 and received full accreditation from the American Osteopathic Association in 2021.

The school began the inaugural class in summer 2017. Medical graduates of UIW-SOM will receive the Doctor of Osteopathic Medicine (D.O.) degree.

== History ==
UIWSOM opened in 2015, as the second osteopathic medical school in the state of Texas, after the Texas College of Osteopathic Medicine, an academic unit of the University of North Texas Health Science Center in Fort Worth. UIW-SOM is the site of former President John F. Kennedy's last public speech prior to his assassination in 1963, making building 1 a historical site.

== Campus ==
The campus of UIWSOM is located on 23 acres (9.3 ha) in south San Antonio, about 20 minutes from the main UIW campus. Formerly the site of the US Air Force School of Aerospace Medicine, and now a registered historic district, the campus is on the northwest corner of the Brooks City Base.

== Academics ==
UIWSOM confers the Doctor of Osteopathic Medicine medical degree. In addition, a one-year masters program is offered: Master in Biomedical Sciences program.

The university plans to eventually move its Masters in Nursing and Physical Therapy programs to the Brooks City campus.

== See also ==
- List of medical schools in the United States
