= University of Washington School of Medicine =

Public medical school in Seattle, Washington, US

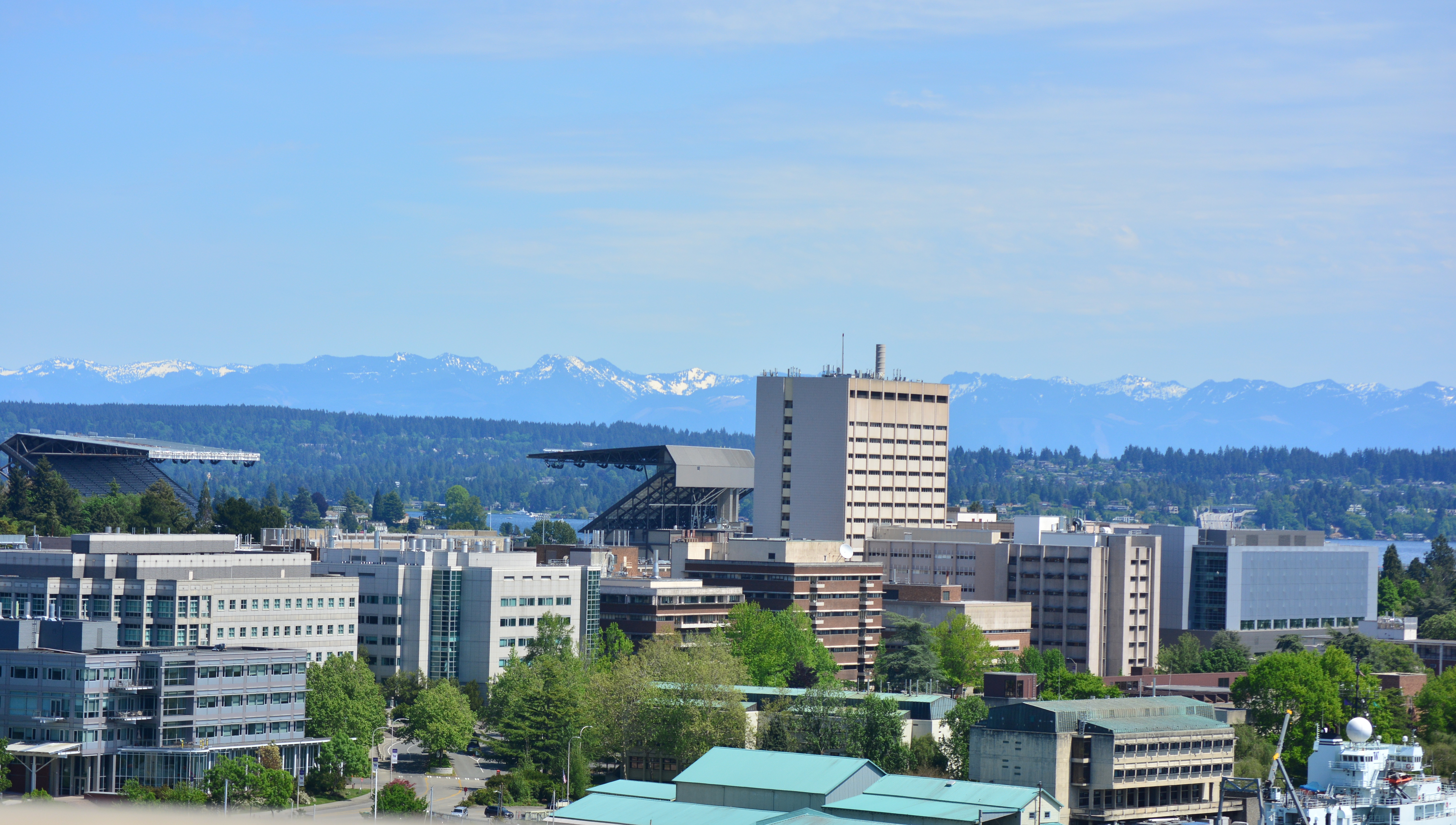
- The School of Medicine at the University of Washington Health Sciences Center
- Type: Public
- Established: 1946
- Parent institution: University of Washington
- Accreditation: Accreditation Council for Graduate Medical Education
- Dean: Tim Dellit
- Academic staff: 1,800
- Students: 957
- Location: Seattle, Washington, U.S. 47.649°N 122.307°W
- Campus: Urban
- Website: uwmedicine.org/school-of-medicine
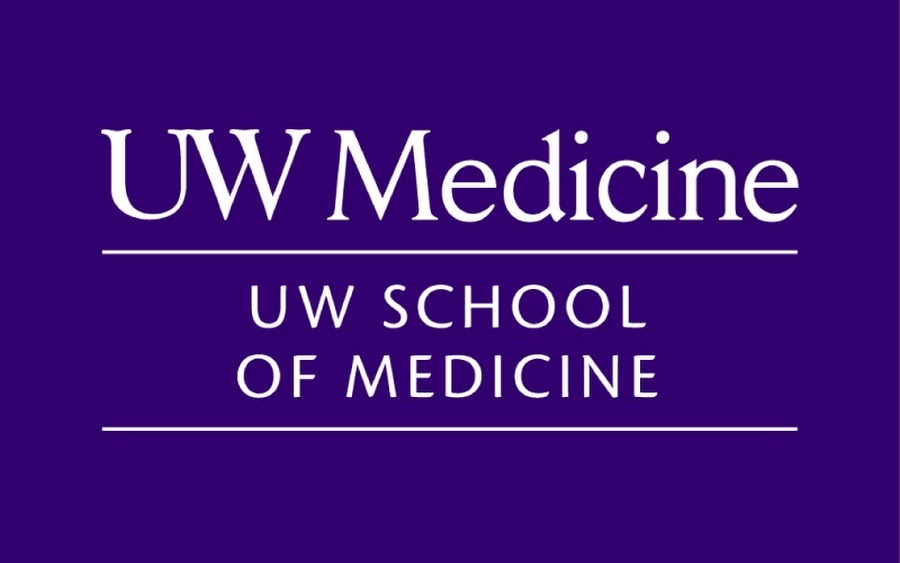

The University of Washington School of Medicine is the medical school of the University of Washington, a public research university in Seattle, Washington. According to U.S. News & World Report's 2022 Best Graduate School rankings, University of Washington School of Medicine ranked #1 in the nation for primary care education, and #7 for research.

The University of Washington School of Medicine is the first public medical school in the states of Washington, Wyoming, Alaska, Montana, and Idaho. The school maintains a network of teaching facilities in more than 100 towns and cities across the five-state region. As part of this "WWAMI" partnership, medical students from Wyoming, Alaska, Montana, and Idaho spend their first year and a half at the University of Wyoming, the University of Alaska Anchorage, Montana State University, or the University of Idaho, respectively. In addition, sixty students in each class are based at Gonzaga University in Spokane, Washington. Preference is given to residents of the WWAMI states.

== UW Medicine ==
The University of Washington Medicine includes the University of Washington School of Medicine, as well as a number of clinical facilities owned and operated by the UW, including the following:

- Harborview Medical Center — Seattle
- University of Washington Medical Center — Seattle
- Northwest Hospital & Medical Center — Seattle
- University of Washington Medicine Neighborhood Clinics — nine primary care facilities
- University of Washington School of Medicine
- University of Washington Physicians — a physician practice
- Airlift Northwest — a medical transport system for Washington, Alaska, Montana and Idaho

In addition, the University of Washington Medicine shares in the ownership and governance of Children’s University Medical Group and Seattle Cancer Care Alliance, a partnership between the University of Washington Medicine, Fred Hutchinson Cancer Research Center, and Seattle Children's.

== History ==
The school was founded in 1946 as the 76th medical school in the country and in the fall of 1947 admitted the first class with 50 medical students. It is a leader in primary care, family medicine, biomedical research, experimental therapy, clinical treatments, and academic medicine.

In May 2013, it was announced that UW Medicine and PeaceHealth were coming together in a "strategic affiliation."

In 2023, the University of Washington School of Medicine announced that it, along with other medical schools such as Harvard Medical School, the Vagelos College of Physicians and Surgeons at Columbia, the Perelman School of Medicine at the University of Pennsylvania, and Stanford Medical School, would no longer contribute data to the U.S. News & World Report for medical school rankings.

In November 2023, Tim Dellit was named CEO of UW Medicine.

On May 9, 2025, the United States' Department of Government Efficiency (DOGE) announced the termination of over $23.84 million in contracts between the U.S. federal government and the University of Washington School of Medicine, which were designed to fund research on the impacts of sexually transmitted infections. These contracts were terminated by an unknown employee of DOGE, who worked under the pseudonym "HHSAHAYNES".

== WWAMI ==
List of WWAMI campuses
1 Seattle, WA
2 Spokane, WA
3 Moscow, ID
4 Bozeman, MT
5 Laramie, WY
6 Anchorage, AK

The Washington, Wyoming, Alaska, Montana, Idaho (WWAMI) program is a collection of states and universities that have agreed to a collaboration of facilities, people, and funding to enhance the region's access to education. The University of Washington WWAMI program is set in six cities across the five-state region; the institutional partners and class size of each campus is listed below. Each campus is supported both by the University of Washington and the partner institution. During the clinical phase of the curriculum, years three and four, clinical sites are found within all five WWAMI states and students from each campus have the opportunity to rotate throughout the region.

University of Washington WWAMI Sites
State	Campus	Partner Institution	Class Size
Washington	Seattle	University of Washington	100
Washington	Spokane	Gonzaga University	60
Wyoming	Laramie	University of Wyoming	20
Alaska	Anchorage	University of Alaska Anchorage	30
Montana	Bozeman	Montana State University	30
Idaho	Moscow	University of Idaho	40

== Notable alumni ==
- Benjamin Danielson
- Maxine Dexter, U.S. Representative from Oregon
- Diana L. Farmer, Pearl Stamps Stewart Professor of Surgery and chair of the Department of Surgery at the University of California, Davis and surgeon-in-chief of UC Davis Children's Hospital
- Brian S. Kim, Sol and Clara Kest Professor, Vice Chair of Research, and Site Chair of Mount Sinai West and Morningside in the Kimberly and Eric J. Waldman Department of Dermatology at Icahn School of Medicine at Mount Sinai

== See also ==
- List of medical schools in the United States
- WWAMI Regional Medical Education Program
