= Gold Humanism Honor Society =

American medical honor society

- GHHS
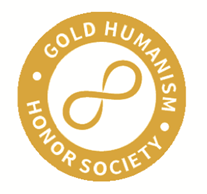
- Founded: 2002; 24 years ago Fort Lee, New Jersey, US
- Type: Honor
- Affiliation: Arnold P. Gold Foundation
- Status: Active
- Emphasis: Humanism in healthcare
- Scope: National
- Chapters: 180
- Members: 45,000+ lifetime
- Headquarters: 2125 Center Avenue, Suite 305; Fort Lee, New Jersey 07024; United States
- Website: www.gold-foundation.org/programs/ghhs/

The Gold Humanism Honor Society (GHHS) is an American honor society that recognizes senior medical students, residents, and physician teachers for excellence in clinical care, compassion, and dedication to humanism in service. It was created by the Arnold P. Gold Foundation for Humanism in Medicine in 2002 and has more than 45,000 members.

== History ==
The idea for the Gold Humanism Honor Society (GHHS) came from residency program directors and medical educators who wanted a way to identify residency applicants with outstanding clinical and interpersonal skills. In 1999, the Arnold P. Gold Foundation spearheaded the effort to create the honor society, wanting to improve healthcare and the culture of medical schools. The society's establishment was sponsored by the Robert Wood Johnson Foundation, The Berrie Foundation, and an anonymous donor.

The Gold Humanism Honor Society was established in 2002 by the Arnold P. Gold Foundation and is its signature program. The mission of GHHS "is to recognize individuals who are exemplars of humanistic patient care and who can serve as role models, mentors, and leaders in medicine." In 2009, a study published in the Journal of Surgical Education found that membership in GHHS had a positive impact on a medical student's selection for residency.

GHHS had 113 medical student chapters, fifteen resident chapters, and more than 20,000 members in August 2014. The Association of American Medical Colleges amended the Electronic Residency application in 2016 to include a GHHS identified in 2016.

GHHS supports the importance of humanistic healthcare and honors physicians who achieve this excellence. A 2018 study published in the journal Teaching and Learning in Medicine concluded that GHHS members "scored significantly higher on average over 4 years than non-GHHS inductees on clinical empathy, patient-centered beliefs, and tolerance of ambiguity." The study was completed using date from the American Medical Association Learning Environment Study.

As of 2024, GHHS has more than 180 chapters in medical schools and internship programs and more than 45,000 members. It is overseen by the staff of the Arnold P. Gold Foundation in Fort Lee, New Jersey.

== Symbols and traditions ==
Members are inducted in a White Coat Ceremony.

== Activities ==
GHHS sponsors service initiatives, including Solidarity Week for Compassionate Care and Thank a Resident Day. It hosts the Gold Connection podcast. It presents the Leonard Tow Humanism in Medicine awards and The Arnold P. Gold Foundation Humanism and Excellence in Teaching Awards. It also holds a biennial national educational conference.

== Membership ==
Members include fourth-year medical students who plan on residency, residents, and medical school faculty of institutions with chapters. Members are elected by their colleagues and staff and are reviewed by a screening committee based on their contribution to humanism and their Communication skills, community service, compassion, integrity, and moral judgment. Members come from the top ten to fifteen percent of third-year medical students.

== Chapters ==
As of 2024, GHHS has more than 180 chapters in medical schools and internship programs and more than 45,000 members.
