= Liaison Committee on Medical Education =

Accrediting body in United States and Canada

- Abbreviation: LCME
- Headquarters: Washington, D.C., U.S.
- Location(s): United States and Canada
- Parent organization: Association of American Medical Colleges; American Medical Association
- Website: lcme.org

The Liaison Committee on Medical Education (LCME) is an accrediting body for educational programs at schools of medicine in the United States and Canada. The LCME is sponsored by the Association of American Medical Colleges and the American Medical Association.

The committee publishes many guides and standards, including the Directory of Accredited Medical Education Programs. The LCME currently accredits 155 U.S. schools, which includes 4 in Puerto Rico, as well as 17 others in Canada. The LCME accredits the schools that grant a Doctor of Medicine (M.D.) degree. Graduates of LCME-accredited schools are eligible for residency programs accredited by the Accreditation Council for Graduate Medical Education (ACGME).

== History ==
The Liaison Committee on Medical Education (LCME), an accrediting body for US and Canadian professional education services, was established at a 1942 conference of members of the Association of American Medical Colleges (AAMC) and the American Medical Association. Since 1979, LCME has collaborated with the Committee on Accreditation of Canadian Medical Schools sponsored by the Association of Faculties of Medicine of Canada and the Canadian Medical Association) for the accreditation of Canadian medical schools.

== Organization ==
The LCME has 19 voting members from three categories:

- Professional Members: 14 professional members elected by the LCME representing the medical education and clinical practice communities in the U.S.
- Student Members: Two student members appointed for a one-year, nonrenewable term.
- Public Members: Two public members representing the interests of the general public elected by the LCME to serve for a three-year term.

== Accreditation ==
Accreditation is a process by which medical institutions and programs located in the U.S. and Canada undergo a detailed peer-based assessment of compliance with standards for medical education quality. LCME accreditation is required in most states for licensing students and obtaining federal financial aid and professional education services in the United States and Canada leading to an MD degree. The evaluation is conducted by LCME periodically, typically every eight years. The programs that meet the standards are considered "accredited".

Graduates of LCME-approved institutions are considered to have an educational experience sufficient to prepare them for internship programs that are approved for the purposes of the Accreditation Council for Graduate Medical Education as well as allowing them access to selected federal grants and programs and medical licensure by state boards. The accreditation process includes on-site surveys in which the LCME is represented by ad-hoc teams of evaluators. Team members include basic science and clinical science educators. .

As of 2021, institutions must demonstrate appropriate performance in the following twelve standards to obtain or maintain accreditation:

Standard	Description
Standard 1	Mission, Planning, Organization, and Integrity
Standard 2	Leadership and Administration
Standard 3	Academic and Learning Environments
Standard 4	Faculty Preparation, Productivity, Participation, and Policies
Standard 5	Educational Resources and Infrastructure
Standard 6	Competencies, Curricular Objectives, and Curricular Design
Standard 7	Curricular Content
Standard 8	Curricular Management, Evaluation, and Enhancement
Standard 9	Teaching, Supervision, Assessment, and Student and Patient Safety
Standard 10	Medical Student Selection, Assignment, and Progress
Standard 11	Medical Student Academic Support, Career Advising, and Educational Records
Standard 12	Medical Student Health Services, Personal Counseling, and Financial Aid Services

The method frequently promotes change of systematic and programmatic practice.

== See also ==
- Commission on Osteopathic College Accreditation, which performs a similar function for Doctor of Osteopathic Medicine (D.O.) degrees
- Accreditation Council for Graduate Medical Education
- Accreditation Commission of Colleges of Medicine, which performs a similar function for offshore medical schools
