= Idaho College of Osteopathic Medicine =

Osteopathic medical school in Idaho

Coordinates: 43.5946°N 116.3765°W

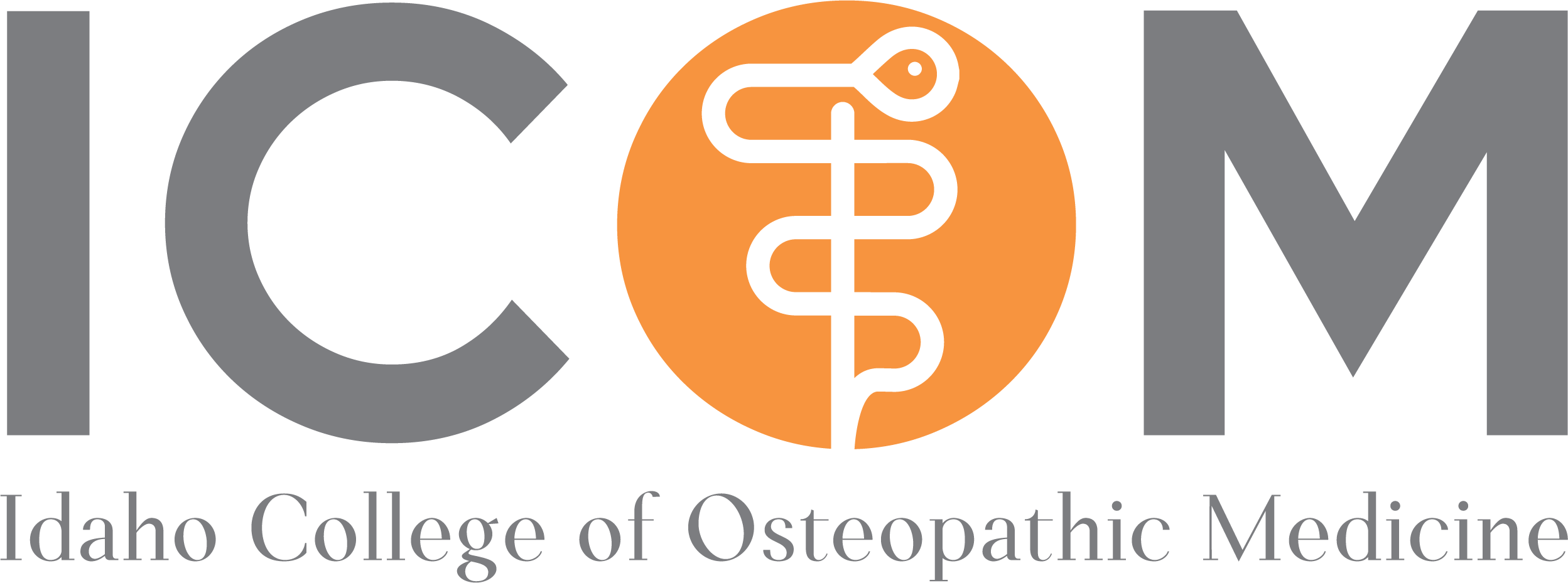
- Type: For profit
- Established: 2016; 10 years ago
- Affiliations: Idaho State University
- Chairman: David C. Pate
- President: Tracy Farnsworth
- Dean: Kevin Wilson
- Students: ~600
- Doctoral students: ~600
- Location: Meridian, Idaho, USA
- Website: www.icom.edu

Idaho College of Osteopathic Medicine (ICOM) is a private, for-profit osteopathic medical school. The college is currently owned by Rice University, a private university based in Houston, and TPG, an international private equity company. Founded in 2016, ICOM is located next to the Meridian campus of Idaho State University (ISU). At ICOM, students can earn a Doctor of Osteopathic Medicine (D.O.) degree.

== History ==
Before ICOM was established, Idaho was the most populous state without a medical school of its own. Although Idaho is among the most rapidly growing areas of the country, the state ranks 49th in physicians per capita. ICOM was founded by Dan Burrell, who also founded the Burrell College of Osteopathic Medicine in Las Cruces, NM. Though the school is private, it was founded in partnership with Idaho State University and other senior Idaho healthcare and government officials. The medical school helps address the current and growing shortage of physicians in the Mountain West region and beyond. With approval from the Idaho State Board of Education, former Idaho Governor C.L. "Butch" Otter announced the creation of ICOM in February 2016. In December 2017 COCA granted ICOM pre-accreditation status and authorized the recruitment of 162 students. ICOM's inaugural class matriculated in August 2018. This class graduated in May 2022 and went on to have a 100% residency match rate, leading to ICOM's elevation to full accreditation status by COCA.

== Campus ==
Located in Meridian, Idaho, the three-story, 94,000-square-foot facility cost $34 million, and took Engineered Structures, Inc. (ESI) just thirteen months to build. Dekker/Perich/Sabatini, a New Mexico-based architecture firm, did the design.

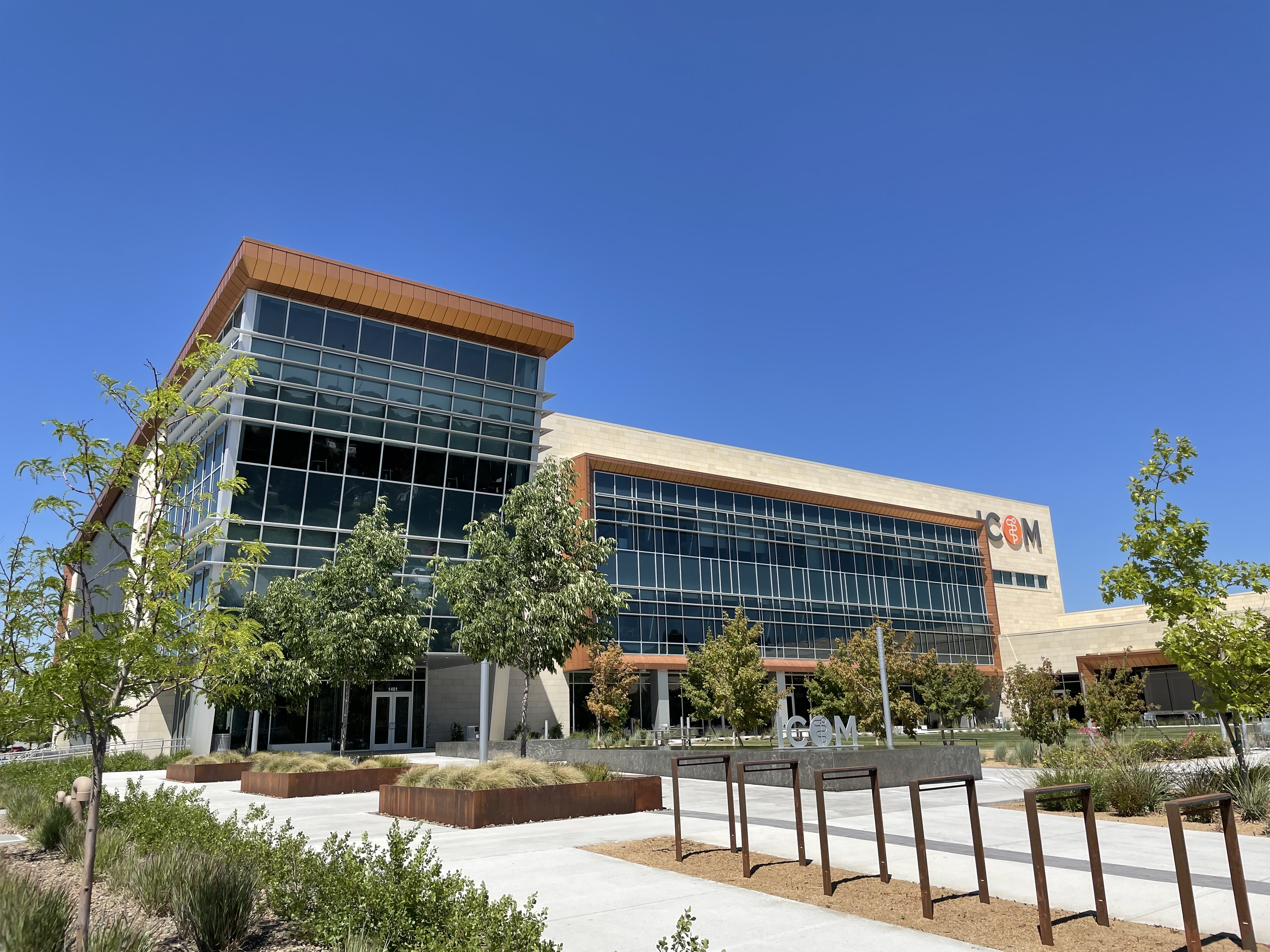
ICOM's campus from the front.

ICOM's campus includes more than 12,000 feet of classroom space, including two lecture halls, each with 250 seats; a clinical simulation center; a 3,500-square-foot medical library; and a 3,479-square-foot osteopathic manipulative medicine (OMM) Lab. Additionally, 12 Objective Structured Clinical Examination (OSCE) rooms are located on the second floor.

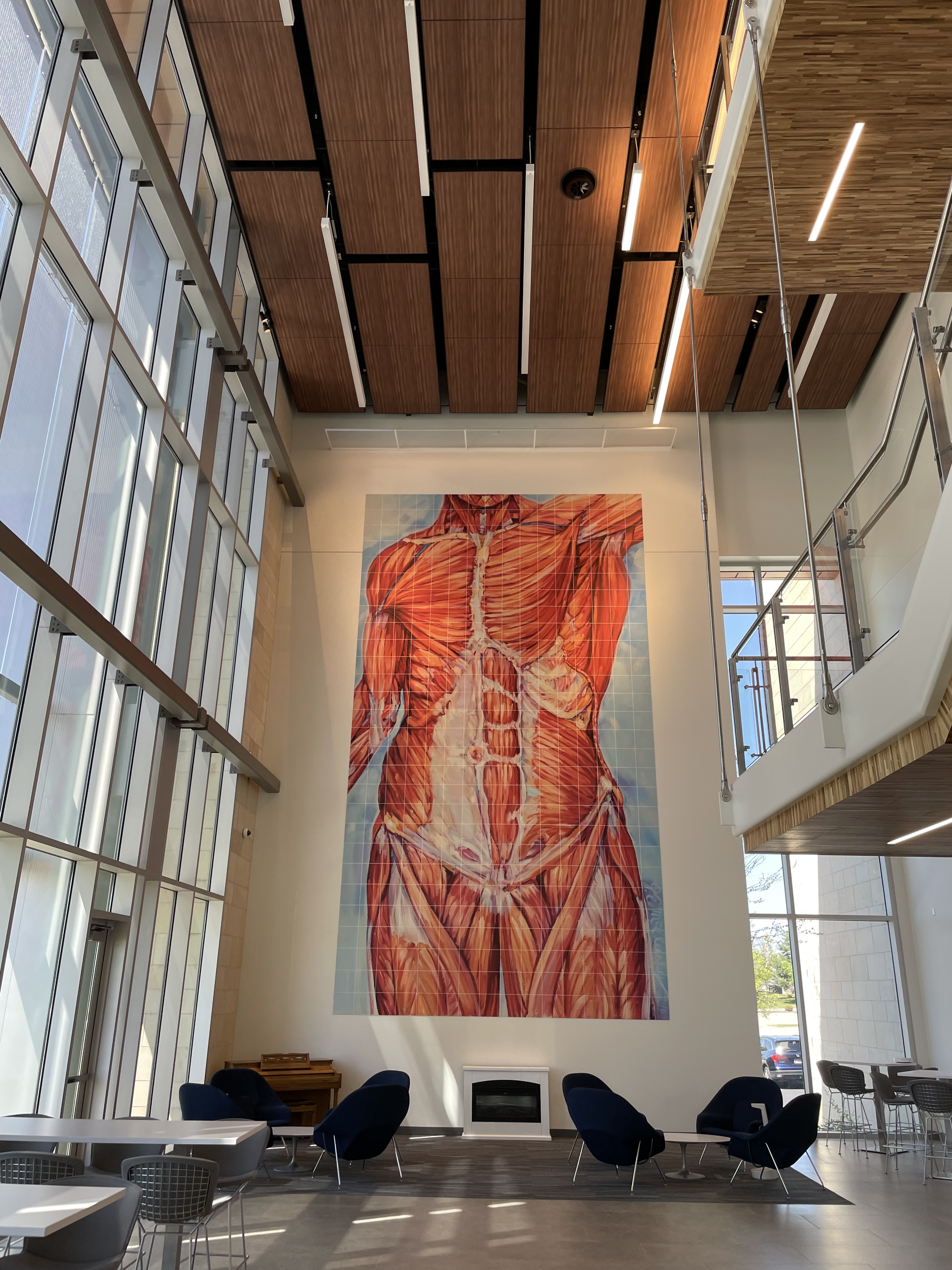
This photo shows ICOM's atrium, just after stepping inside the front doors. The 16-by-28-foot mural is a version of a life-size painting by John E. Mcclusky.

ICOM has a 40-year agreement with Idaho State University-Meridian, which is located next to the ICOM campus, for use of its Treasure Valley Anatomy and Physiology Laboratory (TVAPL). There, ICOM's first-year and second-year medical students perform whole-body dissections on donated bodies, also known as cadavers.

== Academics ==
As a free-standing medical school, ICOM only offers graduate-level training. ICOM awards the Doctor of Osteopathic Medicine degree (DO). This is a four-year degree with years 1 and 2 consisting of on-campus didactic lectures, small group assignments laboratory and clinical experiences. Years 3 and 4 are completed at selected clinical sites.

ICOM also offers concurrent degrees of DO+MPH and DO+MHA, in collaboration with ISU.

== Student life ==
Students participate in several organizations and interest committees on campus. There are more than 30 student organizations represented on campus, ranging from national, professional and general interest.
