= Commission on Osteopathic College Accreditation =

The American Osteopathic Association's (AOA) Commission on Osteopathic College Accreditation (COCA) accredits medical schools granting the Doctor of Osteopathic Medicine (DO) degree in the United States. The US Department of Education lists the Commission as a recognized accreditor.

== Accreditation standards ==
There are many requirements for the accreditation of a college of osteopathic medicine. Accreditation requires that the college have a clearly defined mission, resources to attain it, and evidence that achieving that mission is likely. Accreditation also requires that the college incorporate the science of medicine and osteopathic principles and practice into the curriculum. For a new school to open or for an established school to receive approval to grow in size, the school must also demonstrate that it has access to enough clerkship sites for the third and fourth year students. Standards also require training in internal medicine, obstetrics/gynecology, pediatrics, family practice, surgery, psychiatry, emergency medicine, radiology, preventive medicine and public health.

== See also ==
- List of recognized accreditation associations of higher learning
