= 2019 El Paso Walmart shooting =

Mass shooting in Texas, U.S.

- Surveillance camera video showing Crusius inside of the Walmart
- Location: 31.7771°N 106.3843°W; 7101 Gateway West Blvd. El Paso, Texas, U.S.
- Date: August 3, 2019; 7 years ago 10:38 – 10:41 a.m. (MDT UTC−06:00)
- Target: Mexicans
- Attack type: Mass shooting; hate crime; mass murder; domestic terrorism; right-wing terrorism
- Weapon: 7.62×39mm GP WASR-10 semi-automatic rifle
- Deaths: 23
- Injuries: 22
- Perpetrator: Patrick Crusius
- Motive: Anti-Mexican sentiment; Far-right terrorism; Anti-immigration; Racism; White supremacy; Belief in the white genocide conspiracy theory and the Great Replacement conspiracy theory; Ecofascism; Accelerationist neo-Nazism
- Verdict: Federal, state: Pleaded guilty
- Convictions: Federal convictions: Hate crime resulting in death (23 counts); Use of a firearm to commit murder during and in relation to a crime of violence (23 counts); Hate crimes involving an attempt to kill (22 counts); Use of a firearm during and in relation to a crime of violence (22 counts); State convictions: Capital murder; Aggravated assault with a deadly weapon (22 counts)
- Sentence: Federal: 90 consecutive life sentences without the possibility of parole State: 23 concurrent life sentences without the possibility of parole
Location of Texas and the United States:
- El Paso (Texas) El Paso (the United States)

On August 3, 2019, a mass shooting occurred at a Walmart store in El Paso, Texas, United States. The gunman, 21-year-old Patrick Crusius, shot 45 people, killing 23 (Note: Twenty of the victims died on the day of the shooting, two others died in the following days, and the 23rd victim initially survived the shooting but later died of his wounds on April 26, 2020.) and injuring 22 others. The Federal Bureau of Investigation investigated the shooting as an act of domestic terrorism and a hate crime. The shooting has been described as the deadliest attack on Latinos in modern American history.

Crusius surrendered and was arrested and charged with capital murder in connection with the shooting. He posted a manifesto with white nationalist and anti-immigrant themes on the imageboard 8chan shortly before the attack. The manifesto cites the Christchurch mosque shootings in New Zealand earlier that year and the far-right conspiracy theory known as the Great Replacement as inspiration for the attack.

In 2023, Crusius pleaded guilty to 90 federal murder and hate crime charges, and he was sentenced to 90 consecutive life sentences. Crusius pleaded guilty to the state charges on April 21, 2025, and was sentenced to life in prison without parole.

== Events ==
=== Preceding ===
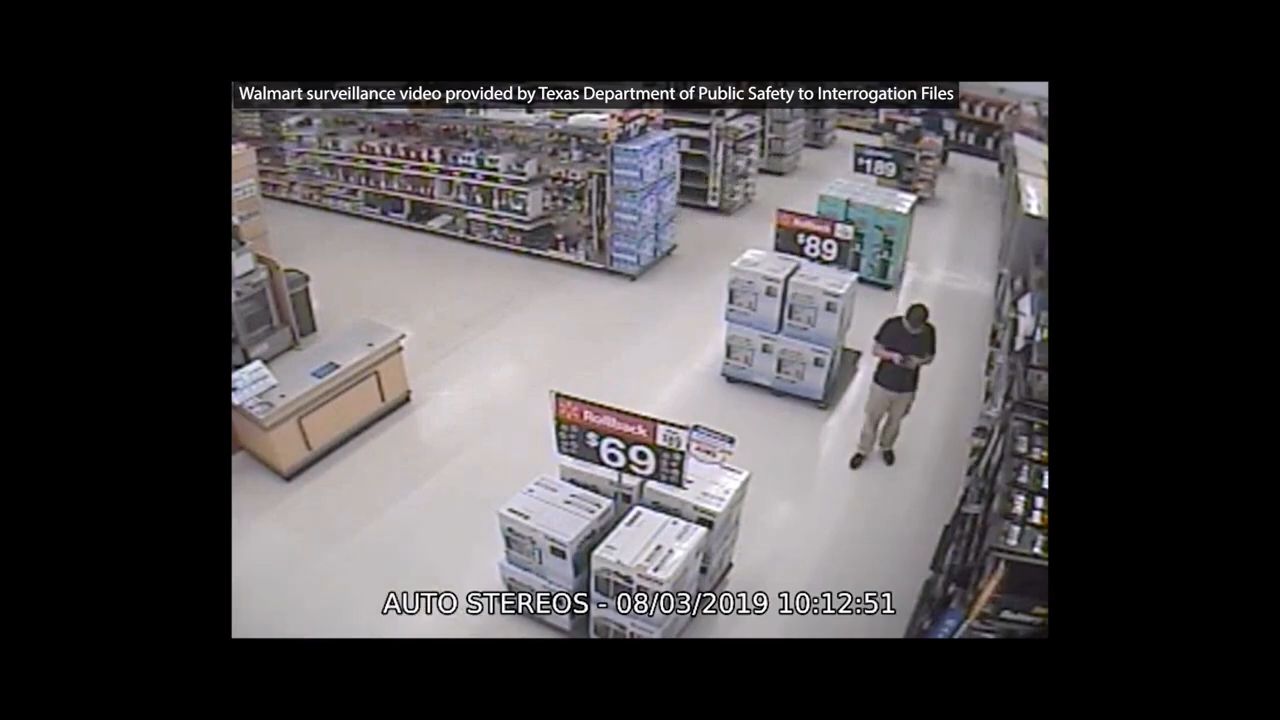
Crusius standing in the Walmart prior to the shooting

Around midnight before the shooting, Crusius left his grandparents' house in Allen, Texas. Throughout the entire night, he drove 650 miles (1,050 km) to El Paso, Texas in his 2012 Honda Civic. He stopped his car for gas and energy drinks twice throughout the journey. The next morning, Crusius eventually made it to El Paso at around 8 a.m. For roughly an hour, he drove around El Paso with no clear target in mind. He also stopped at a pizzeria but left because it was closed. He arrived at the Walmart near the Cielo Vista Mall on the east side of El Paso at around 9 a.m. Crusius entered the store and walked around for half an hour to carry out a reconnaissance of the building. He went back to his car and waited for a few minutes before entering the store again to purchase an orange. He ate the orange in the store before heading back to his car.

At 10:15 a.m., while sitting in his car, Crusius opened his laptop, went on the imageboard 8chan, and started a thread titled, "ITS TIME". Five minutes later, he posted a reply in the thread and uploaded the PDF file of his manifesto.

At 10:37 a.m., Crusius walked to the back of his car to gear up and pull out a 7.62×39mm caliber GP WASR-10 rifle, a semi-automatic civilian version of the AKM, from the trunk. A minute later, he closed the trunk and opened fire.

=== Shooting ===
Crusius first killed a woman pushing a shopping cart before shooting several people near and at a fundraising event for the El Paso Fusion girls soccer team outside the store. During this initial shooting, Crusius fatally shot three people (including a man who died eight months later) and injured six in the parking lot.

The store manager witnessed Crusius firing in the parking lot prior to entering the crowded store. He issued a "Code Brown", designating an active shooter, to his employees, who began helping customers evacuate or hide. Approximately 3,000 people were in the mall complex at the time of the shooting. Many customers and employees fled to adjacent stores or hid under tables or in shipping containers located behind the building.

At 10:39 a.m., Crusius entered the Walmart through the west entrance. As he walked in, he fatally shot an elderly man who tried running from him before walking to his right. He walked along the front of the store eastwards and fired at people along the way. He then turned towards a First Convenience Bank inside the store and shot several people in the bank lobby, killing nine. Crusius moved on to shoot people in the checkout lines, killing nine. Crusius eventually stopped shooting and began sprinting towards the exit. He reached the eastern doors of the store at 10:41 a.m. In total, he shot and killed 19 people and injured 15 others inside the Walmart building.

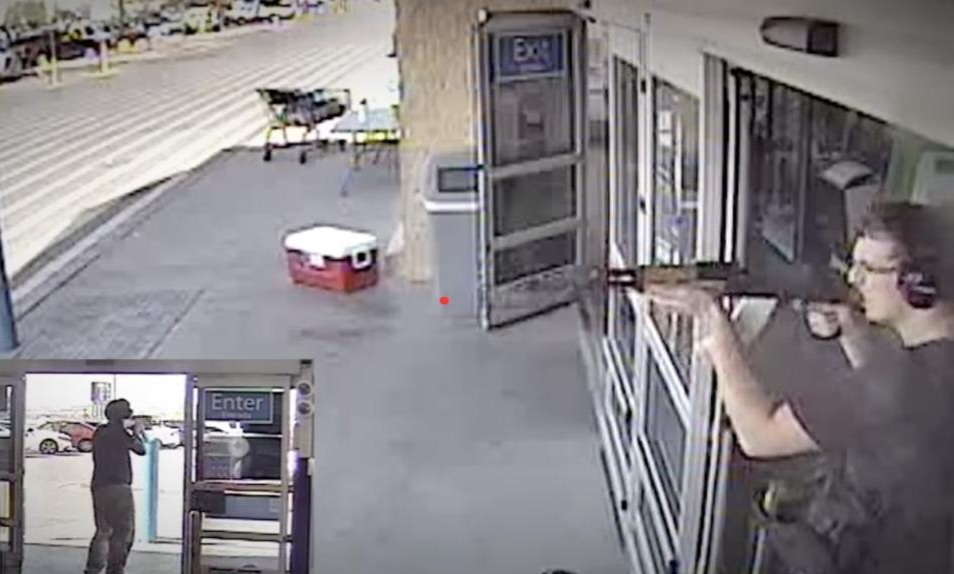
Crusius shooting at a moving car shortly before exiting the Walmart

As Crusius left the building, he stopped to open fire on a moving car in the parking lot, killing a man and injuring his wife. Without shooting anyone else, Crusius returned to his car while still holding the rifle.

It is determined that Crusius had fired approximately 90 rounds or less. He reloaded his rifle twice during the shooting.

=== Immediate aftermath ===
First responders began to arrive within six minutes of the initial 9-1-1 call. The El Paso Police Department, Texas Rangers, and paramedics responded to the scene along with the FBI and the ATF.

After the shooting, Crusius drove to the intersection of Sunmount and Viscount. Arriving there, he stopped at the left turn lane, came out of the car with his hands up and identified himself as the shooter to Texas Rangers and an El Paso motorcycle officer. He was then arrested and transported to police headquarters.

== Victims ==
List of deaths

Victims:
- Andre Anchondo, 23
- Jordan Anchondo, 24
- Arturo Benavides, 60
- Leonardo Campos, 41
- Angie Englisbee, 86
- Maria Flores, 77
- Raul Flores, 83
- Guillermo "Memo" Garcia, 36 (Note: Garcia initially survived the shooting, but died on April 26, 2020, as a result of his injuries.)
- Jorge Calvillo García, 61
- Adolfo Cerros Hernández, 68
- Alexander Gerhard Hoffman, 66
- David Johnson, 63
- Luis Alfonzo Juarez, 90
- Maria Eugenia Legarreta Rothe, 58
- Maribel (Campos) Loya, 56
- Ivan Filiberto Manzano, 46
- Elsa Mendoza Marquez, 57
- Gloria Irma Márquez, 61
- Margie Reckard, 63
- Sara Esther Regalado Moriel, 66
- Javier Rodriguez, 15
- Teresa Sanchez, 82
- Juan Velazquez, 77

— Sources:

The shooting has been described as the deadliest anti-Latino attack in recent U.S. history, resulting in 23 deaths and 22 injuries. Twenty of the victims were pronounced dead at the scene, one victim died the day after the event, another victim died two days after, and a third died eight months later on April 26, 2020. Among the dead were thirteen Americans, eight Mexicans and one German. The names, ages, and citizenships of 22 of the dead were released by the El Paso Police Department on August 5. Seventeen were 56 or older, two were in their 40s, two in their 20s, one was 36, and one was 15.

Thirteen victims were taken to the University Medical Center of El Paso, and another eleven to the Del Sol Medical Center. Two children, ages 2 and 9, were transferred to El Paso Children's Hospital after their conditions were stabilized. The Del Sol Medical Center patients were between 35 and 82 years old.

== Perpetrator ==
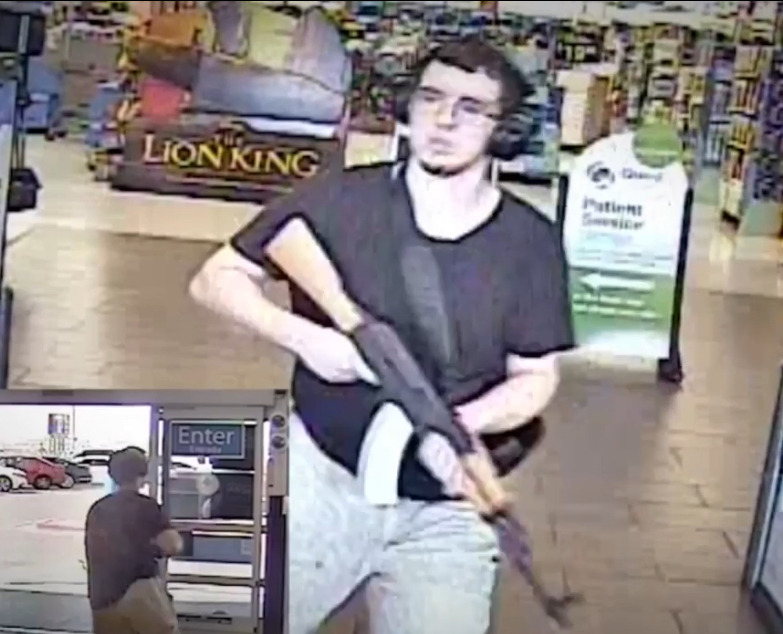
Crusius exiting the Walmart

Patrick Wood Crusius was arrested shortly after the shooting and charged with capital murder. A 21-year-old white man, he was last known to have lived in his family's home in Allen, Texas, in the Dallas–Fort Worth metroplex, approximately 650 miles (1,050 km) from El Paso.

Crusius was born on July 27, 1998. His parents are divorced. His father is a psychotherapist and his mother is a hospice nurse. He graduated in 2017 from Plano Senior High School and was enrolled at Collin College from 2017 until spring 2019. Crusius was also diagnosed with schizoaffective disorder.

Crusius legally purchased a GP WASR-10 semi-automatic rifle and 1,000 rounds of hollow-point ammunition online in June 2019. During his first interrogation, he told detectives he had targeted Mexicans, according to an arrest warrant affidavit.

Crusius registered to vote in 2016 as a Republican and had a Twitter account from 2017 that showed a photo of Donald Trump in the Oval Office. He also had a pro-Trump poll that included responses such as "#BuildTheWall, #NoSanctuaryCities, #KeepGitmoOpen and #BanSyrianRefugees".

=== Manifesto ===
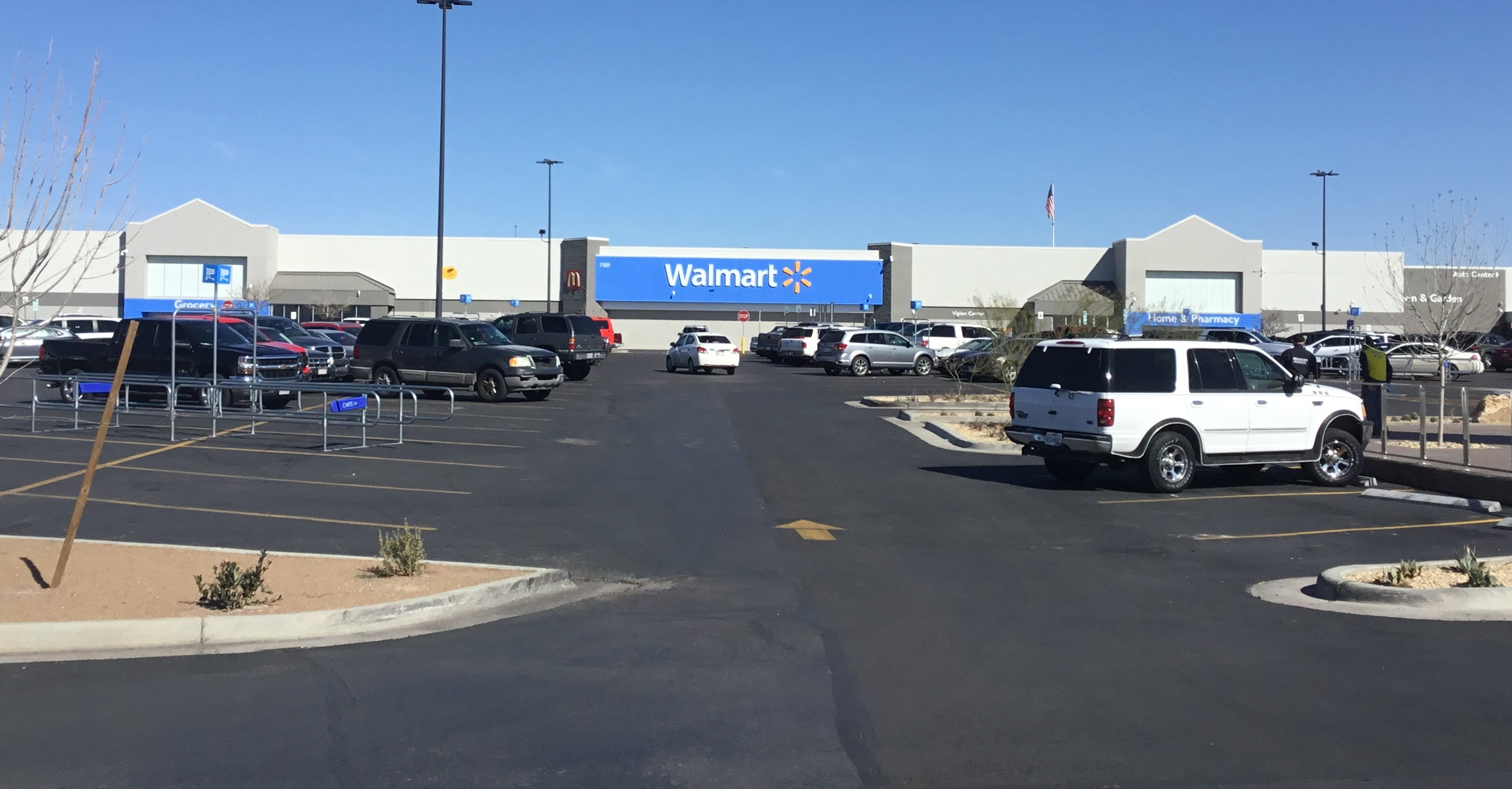
The Walmart where the shooting took place, taken 5 months after the shooting

Crusius had admitted to posting a manifesto, titled The Inconvenient Truth, on the online message board 8chan shortly before the shooting. The post includes the suspect's name, and the manifesto identifies the type of weapon used in the attack. Site moderators quickly removed the original post, though users continued to share copies. Claiming to have been inspired by the Christchurch mosque shootings in New Zealand that killed 51 people earlier the same year, Crusius expresses support in the manifesto for the perpetrator of the Christchurch shootings and states grievances such as environmental degradation, "cultural and ethnic replacement", and a "Hispanic invasion".

The anti-Hispanic, anti-immigrant manifesto promotes the white nationalist and far-right conspiracy theory called the Great Replacement, often attributed to the French writer Renaud Camus. While the document uses language about immigrants similar to that used by U.S. president Donald Trump, (Note: "The manifesto's author said their anger toward immigrants predates Donald Trump's presidency, but the language used bears much similarity with the president's vocabulary."; "[S]ome of the language included in the document parroted Trump's own words, characterizing Hispanic migrants as invaders taking American jobs and arguing to 'send them back'."; "Portions of the 2,300-word essay, titled 'The Inconvenient Truth', closely mirror Trump's rhetoric, as well as the language of the white nationalist movement, including a warning about the 'Hispanic invasion of Texas'."; "But if Mr. Trump did not originally inspire the gunman, he has brought into the mainstream polarizing ideas and people once consigned to the fringes of American society [...] Mr. Crusius described legal and illegal immigrants as 'invaders' who are flooding into the United States, a term Mr. Trump has frequently employed to argue for a border wall.") such as referring to a migrant "invasion", it states that the author's beliefs predate Trump's presidency, and that Trump should not be blamed for the attack. The author's "racially extremist views", according to The New York Times, could be used to prosecute the shooting as a hate crime or act of domestic terrorism.

The manifesto states that Democrats would soon control the United States partly due to an increasing Hispanic population, an idea that had gained acceptance for years on right-wing radio shows. Criticizing both the Democratic Party and Republican Party for allowing corporations to "import foreign workers", the author describes the shooting as an "incentive" for Hispanics to leave the country, which would "remove the threat" of a Hispanic voting bloc. While primarily focused on ethnic and racial grievances, the document also expresses fears of automation's effects on employment and blames corporations for overusing natural resources.

=== Legal proceedings ===
The arrest warrant affidavit says Crusius waived his Miranda rights, confessed to detectives that he was the shooter, and admitted that he targeted "Mexicans" during the attack. Multiple investigations and jurisdictions were involved with the case. FBI officials in El Paso served multiple warrants in the Dallas area and interviewed acquaintances of Crusius in Dallas and San Antonio.

On February 6, 2020, Crusius was charged with 90 federal charges: 22 counts of committing a hate crime resulting in death, 22 counts of use of a firearm to commit murder, 23 counts of a hate crime involving an attempt to kill, and 23 counts of use of a firearm during a crime. He was also indicted on state capital murder charges by a Texas grand jury on September 12, 2019. He pleaded not guilty to capital murder charges at his arraignment on October 10, 2019, at the El Paso County Courthouse. Crusius waived his federal bond hearing on February 12, 2020, during his first federal court appearance. On April 28, 2020, a new capital murder charge was sought after the death of a twenty-third victim. On July 23, 2020, Crusius entered a plea of not-guilty to federal charges. He also waived his arraignment on those charges.

The trial was delayed due to the COVID-19 pandemic and the large volume of evidence. In July 2020, the federal court granted a defense motion for more time to investigate "a number of 'red-flag' mitigation themes" as federal prosecutors decided whether to seek a death sentence. In the motion, the defense said that Crusius had "severe" lifelong neurological and mental disabilities; that he was treated with antipsychotic medication after his arrest; and that he was in a "psychotic state" when arrested.

At a February 2022 hearing, the defense team requested a trial start date of March 2025 or later, while federal prosecutors asked for a June 2023 trial date. Defense attorneys said they needed more time to comb through 1.76 million files and 763 gigabytes of video obtained through the discovery process, and told U.S. District Judge David C. Guaderrama that the defense might raise an insanity defense. In January 2023, federal prosecutors declined to seek the death penalty for Crusius; state prosecutors did the same in 2025.

On February 8, 2023, Crusius pleaded guilty to 90 federal murder and hate crime charges. On July 7, 2023, Crusius was sentenced to 90 consecutive life sentences. Crusius later pleaded guilty to the state charges on April 21, 2025, and was sentenced to life in prison without parole. He is currently incarcerated at the Louis C. Powledge Unit in Palestine, Texas.

== Aftermath ==
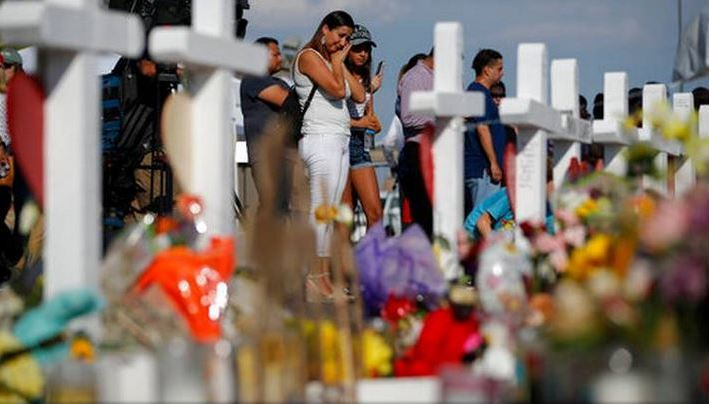
Memorial for the shooting victims

=== Funerals and vigils ===
Several funeral homes in El Paso and Ciudad Juárez announced they would provide funeral services for free to the families of the victims as a sign of solidarity for their community. Ciudad Juárez's Rotary International chapter organized a vigil in Ciudad Juárez. They gathered at a park and lit candles and shone cellphone lights in El Paso's direction as a sign of solidarity.

Antonio Basco declared his wife's funeral on August 16 to be open to anyone who wished to attend. Hundreds of people from El Paso and other parts of the country attended, and flowers were sent from around the world.

El Paso musician Khalid held a benefit concert for his home city on September 1, featuring several high-profile artists and introduced by fellow El Paso native and former US Representative Beto O'Rourke.

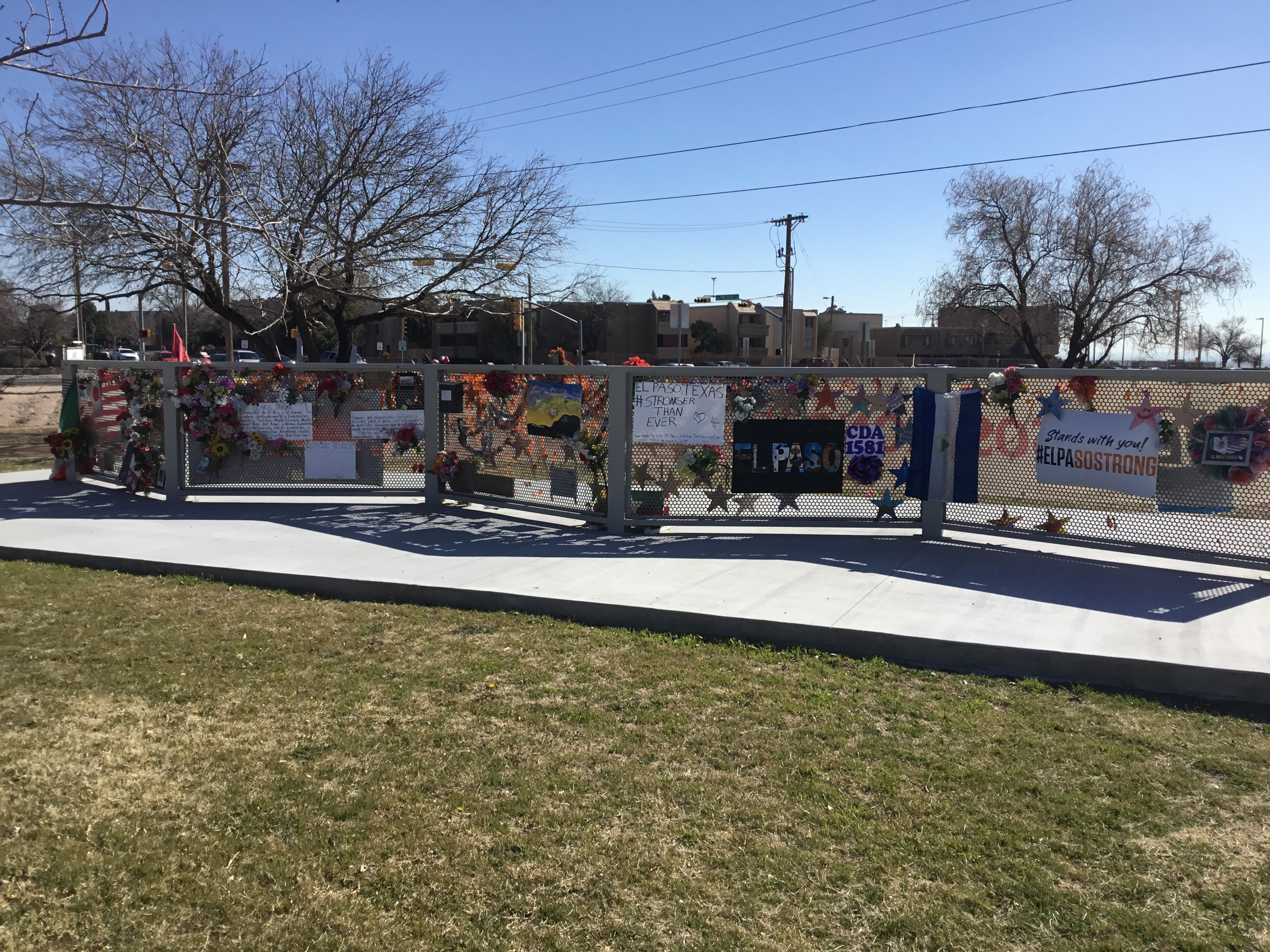
The memorial wall to remember the Walmart victims

=== Tributes ===
One week after the shooting, a citizen from Ciudad Juárez, Jorge Luis Martínez Chávez, ran a total of 22 miles, a mile for each of the people killed in the Walmart shooting (one additional victim died months later), starting at the Zaragoza bridge in Juárez, Mexico, and finishing at the Walmart memorial in El Paso where the attack was perpetrated.

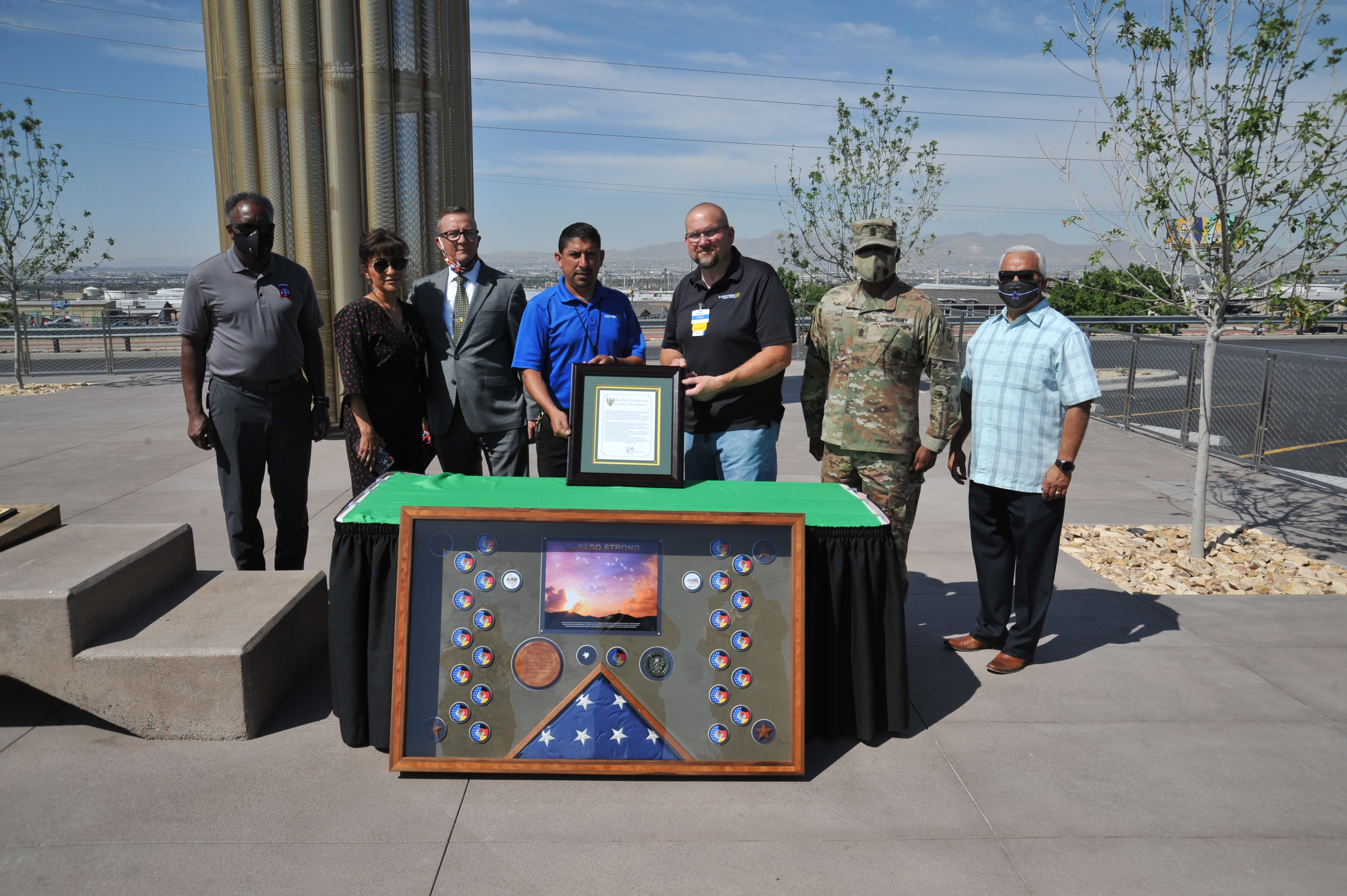
In solidarity with El Paso, the NCO Leadership Center of Excellence, Fort Bliss, presented a memorial memento to Walmart consisting of 23 chips each inscribed with the national flags of the three nationalities of the victims (American, Mexican, and German) as well as the flag which was flying over the NCO Leadership Center of Excellence at the moment of the mass shooting.

The El Paso Healing Garden at Ascarate Park in Mission Valley was dedicated in August 2021. It was designated a national memorial in December 2022.

== Reactions ==
Terrorism experts, including Peter R. Neumann, cited the Great Replacement conspiracy theory as a common factor among several similar attacks. The Southern Poverty Law Center's Hatewatch blog linked the shooting with the earlier Christchurch mosque shootings and the Poway synagogue shooting, citing the similar white nationalist contents of the respective attackers' manifestos. Jonathan Greenblatt, chief executive of the Anti-Defamation League, said that the shooting, as part of a series of similar attacks, indicated a "global threat" of white supremacy. NATO secretary-general Jens Stoltenberg urged countries to work together to prevent "lone wolf" attackers who find inspiration in one another's actions. Others, including the writer Daniel Okrent, disputed the "lone wolf" idea, pointing to the ways in which technology allows those with similar violent ideologies to congregate online.

Several commentators attributed both the El Paso and Christchurch shootings to an ideology of ecofascism. The Washington Post described the El Paso and Christchurch shootings as examples of an eco-fascist trend among white supremacists. Writing in GQ, Luke Darby referred to the "distinctly environmental theme" of Crusius's alleged manifesto. Jeet Heer in The Nation described the manifesto as being based in "Malthusian fascism", a worldview in which different races vie against one another in the face of environmental crises such as global warming. Mainstream environmentalists, including the executive director of the Sierra Club, denounced the attacker's alleged white-supremacist motivations.

=== United States ===
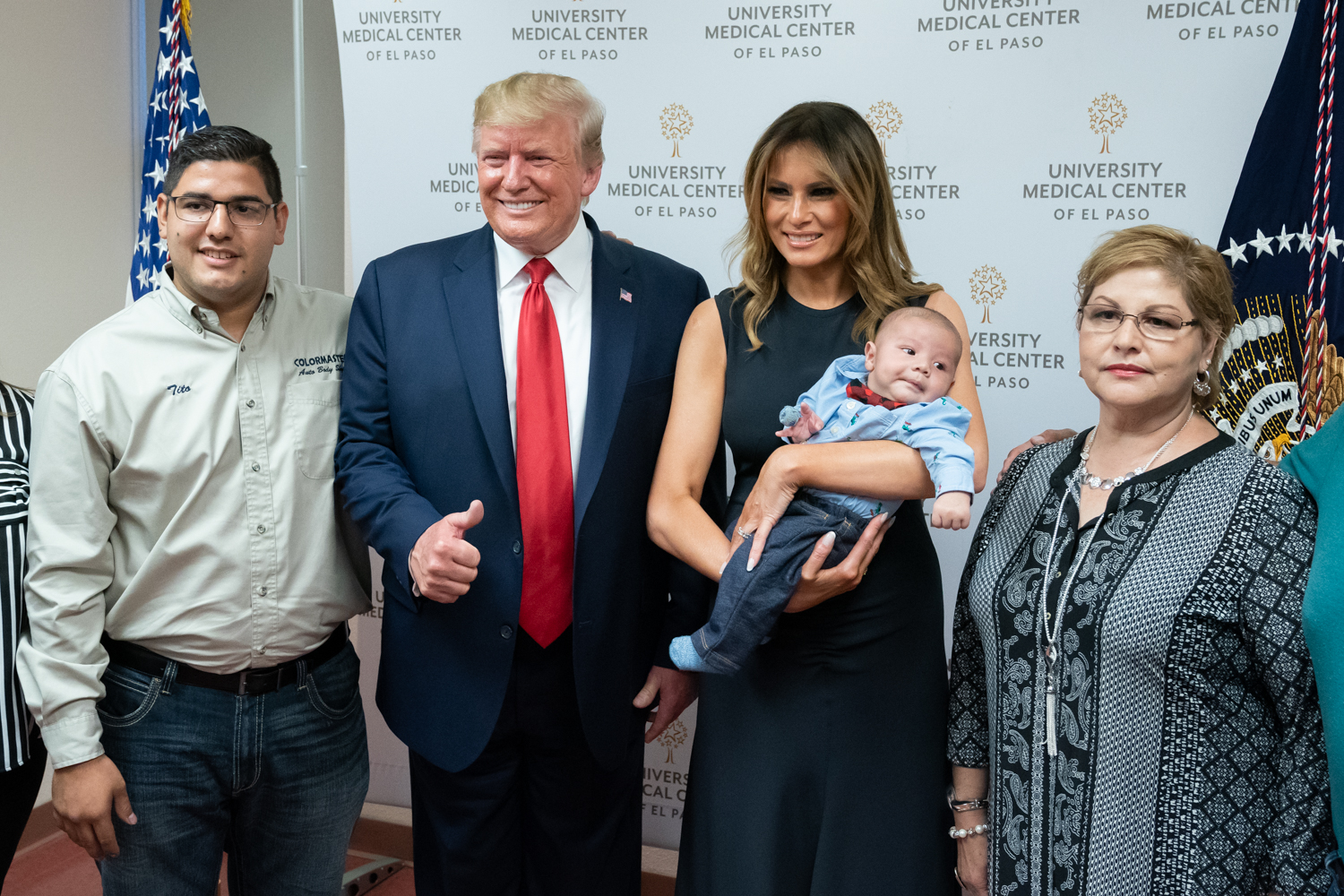
President Trump and the First Lady with the family and baby son of El Paso shooting victims Jordan and Andre Anchondo

President Donald Trump condemned the shooting as "hateful" and an "act of cowardice" later that day. He promised that his administration would provide "total support". In a later statement, Trump announced after the shootings in El Paso and in Dayton, Ohio, that all US flags, both domestic and abroad, would be flown at half-staff until sunset on August 8. In a speech from the White House on August 5, Trump said: "In one voice, our nation must condemn racism, bigotry and white supremacy. These sinister ideologies must be defeated. Hate has no place in America." On August 7, Trump said he was "concerned about the rise of any group of hate", whether it was "white supremacy, whether it's any other kind of supremacy, whether it's antifa".

Within two days of the shooting, #WhiteSupremacistInChief reached the number one trend on Twitter as critics pointed out that statements in the suspect's alleged manifesto mirrored comments Trump had made in the past, including references to illegal immigration as an "invasion" and telling an unspecified group of "'Progressive' Democrat Congresswomen, who originally came from countries whose governments are a complete and total catastrophe" to "go back and help fix the totally broken and crime infested places from which they came". Media outlets also highlighted an incident in May 2019 where an audience member at a campaign rally suggested shooting illegal migrants crossing the border, to which Trump responded with a joke, saying, "only in the Panhandle you can get away with that".

A statement released by former president Barack Obama stated, "We should soundly reject language coming out of the mouths of any of our leaders that feeds a climate of fear and hatred or normalizes racist sentiments," which has widely been interpreted as a criticism of Trump's specific rhetoric. Trump's remark that violent video games contributed to such mass shootings, a view echoed by other politicians such as House Minority Leader of the United States House of Representatives Kevin McCarthy and Texas Lt. Governor Dan Patrick, drew criticism from the video game industry, as past studies have found that no link exists between shootings and video games, and accused the government of using the medium as a scapegoat.

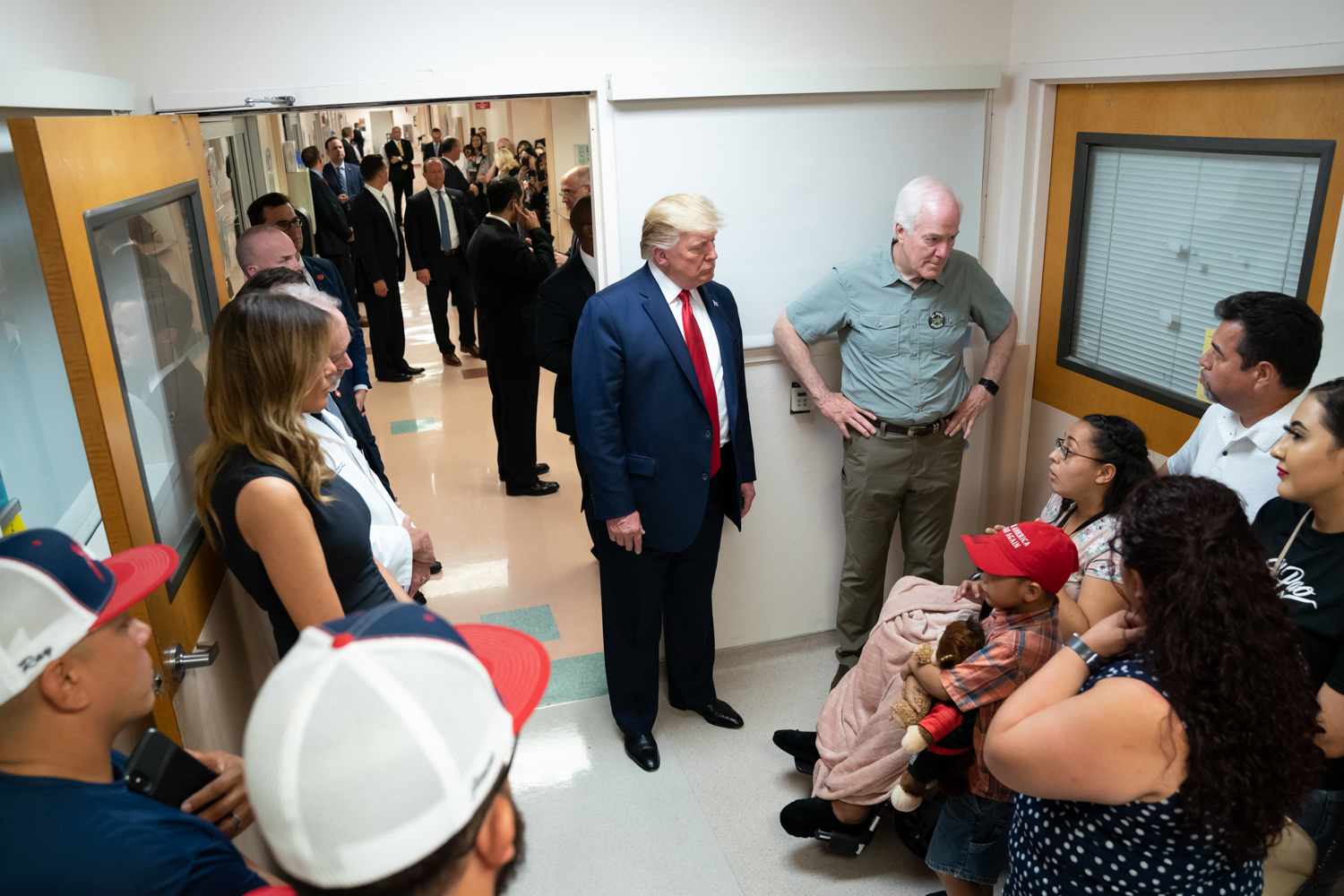
Texas Senator John Cornyn and Trump meet with survivors.

U.S. Representative Veronica Escobar, who represents El Paso in Congress, brought a town hall meeting in the city to an early close following the shooting. Escobar later said there was also a hate epidemic, with domestic terrorism resulting from the dehumanization of others. Texas Senator Ted Cruz issued a written statement deploring "this unspeakable evil." Beto O'Rourke, a native of El Paso who represented the city in Congress from 2013 to 2019, said he was "incredibly saddened" but that "The [El Paso] community is going to stay together. Everyone's resolved to make sure this doesn't continue to happen in this country." Texas Governor Greg Abbott called the shooting "a heinous and senseless act of violence". Texas Senator John Cornyn said that gun violence would not be solved by focusing on law-abiding citizens. Texas Lt. Governor Dan Patrick said violent video games were partly to blame.

Members of the Democratic Party criticized Trump's anti-immigrant rhetoric in the wake of the shooting, including congresswoman Escobar and 2020 presidential candidates O'Rourke, Cory Booker, and Joe Biden. Other 2020 candidates called for political action to eliminate gun violence, including Booker, Pete Buttigieg, Bernie Sanders, Elizabeth Warren, and Andrew Yang. The incident also caused many celebrities and media figures to debate gun rights within the United States, with some condemning the perceived inaction of many political figures in stopping the large number of mass shootings in the country. That same evening, Moms Demand Action, which had a convention that weekend in Washington, D.C., led a march and vigil outside the White House in support of gun control in the United States and the ban of assault weapons.

The day after the shooting, some prominent Republicans, including Texas Land Commissioner George P. Bush, also spoke of the need to combat white-supremacist terrorism. Texas senator Ted Cruz decried the shooting as a "heinous act of terrorism and white supremacy". On Twitter, Deputy Attorney General Rod Rosenstein classified the attack as "white terrorism". Many Latinos interviewed by The New York Times said they felt disturbed at becoming targets of white-nationalist violence.

Dan Stein, the president of the Federation for American Immigration Reform (FAIR), issued a statement on Twitter denouncing the shooting, with no mention of Crusius' alleged manifesto. The group regularly makes similar anti-immigration arguments to those contained in the document, prompting worries of political fallout from the shooting among FAIR and similar groups, according to David Nakamura in The Washington Post. Both Stein and Mark Krikorian of the Center for Immigration Studies, which also advocates restrictions on immigration, dismissed any connections between Crusius' ideology and their own.

In response to the shooting, some 8chan users claimed that the shooter was "our guy". The purported manifesto of the shooter, after being deleted, was re-uploaded by some users, while others commented that it showed "zero effort", or claimed that it was fake. Following the attack, Cloudflare terminated its website security service for 8chan, commenting that "8chan has repeatedly proven itself to be a cesspool of hate". The site later went dark after its server rental provider Voxility discontinued its service. Journalist Robert Evans has cited the shooting and the preceding Christchurch and Poway shootings as being part of a series of mass shootings driven by the "high score" culture that began with the Columbine High School massacre.

Trump visited El Paso and Dayton on August 7. The president and first lady also met with the mayors of El Paso and Dayton. In El Paso, protesters showed up at the site of the shooting, some claiming that Trump's attitude and statements had led to the shooting; Two days before the visit, congresswoman Escobar said that Trump was "not welcome" in the city and declined an invitation to meet with him. The White House published photos and a video of Trump's trip; in some photos, Trump was pictured smiling and giving thumbs up gestures, while the video was focused on Trump shaking hands and posing for photos. Trump said that he had an "amazing day" of visits, praising the "love, the respect for" him as president.

Universal Pictures initially suspended the marketing campaign for the upcoming action horror film The Hunt a few days following both shootings. However, on August 10, Universal pulled the film from its previously scheduled September 27 release date altogether. On February 11, 2020, Universal eventually rescheduled the film for release on March 13, 2020.

==== Glendon Oakley Jr. ====
Glendon Garfield Oakley Jr. (December 16, 1996 – April 8, 2020), a United States Army soldier, was called a hero after helping escort unaccompanied children.

Oakley was born December 16, 1996, grew up in Killeen, Texas and was recruited by the United States Army in Macon, Georgia. He graduated from Basic Combat Training and Advanced Individual Training in March 2018. He served as a private in the 1st Armored Division at Fort Bliss, and he was the recipient of the National Defense Service Medal, the Global War on Terrorism Service Medal, and the Army Service Ribbon. Oakley was found dead in his quarters at Fort Bliss on April 8, 2020. No cause of death was stated, but the possibility of foul play was denied.

On August 4, 2019, Oakley was off-duty and shopping at a Foot Locker store near the Cielo Vista Mall when he became aware of the shooting. He later explained:

I didn't even think. I just grabbed as many kids as I could and ran five stores down to the exit. [...] We got there and ran into a whole batch of police pointing their guns at us. I wasn't focused on myself, and I wasn't focused on my surroundings ... I was just focused on those kids.

— Glendon Oakley Jr., August 4, 2019

Oakley was praised by El Paso police Chief Greg Allen for saving many lives. During his El Paso visit on August 8, 2019, President Donald Trump met Oakley and remarked, "What a job he did."

==== Walmart's reaction ====
Two days after the shooting, a Walmart corporate employee sent a memorandum to Walmart's entire e-commerce division, which includes thousands of employees, urging a "sick-out" strike to force the corporation to stop selling guns. Walmart later sent out a memo instructing workers to remove signs and displays that "contain violent themes or aggressive behavior" and pledged $400,000 for funds that were aimed at helping the victims of the mass shooting. On September 3, the company announced it would stop selling ammunition for handguns and assault rifles in the United States, as well as ask customers not to openly carry firearms into their stores.

=== Mexico ===
News report from Notimex about the shooting and memorials

President Andrés Manuel López Obrador extended his condolences to the families of the victims, both Americans and Mexicans. López Obrador also criticized the "indiscriminate use of weapons" in the United States. The Mexican Secretariat of Foreign Affairs (SRE) identified the eight Mexican citizens killed, and the seven Mexican citizens wounded, in the attack. The Mexican victims killed in the attack came from Ciudad Juárez, Chihuahua City, and Torreón, Coahuila. One of the victims, identified only as "Rosa," who had also offered to testify, was deported on January 30, 2021, because of a minor traffic violation.

Javier Corral Jurado, the governor of the Mexican state of Chihuahua, offered his assistance to Texas governor Greg Abbott and El Paso mayor Dee Margo, and said that Chihuahua authorities were ready to assist in any capacity if needed by the U.S. government. The Chihuahua government also directed Chihuahua residents and Mexican citizens affected by the attack to Mexico's executive committee for Victims (Spanish: Comisión Ejecutiva de Atención a Víctimas), and set up a phone line for Mexican citizens who needed assistance. The Mexican Consulate in El Paso provided consular assistance to Mexican nationals affected by the attack, and sent personnel to visit Mexican victims treated at the hospitals. The SRE confirmed that the consul Mauricio Ibarra Ponce de León would coordinate with El Paso and Ciudad Juárez officials.

On August 4, Mexican Secretary of Foreign Affairs Marcelo Ebrard announced that Mexico would issue a formal charge against the suspect for terrorism against Mexican nationals should Mexico's Attorney General's Office (FGR) support it, and possibly request his extradition from the U.S. to Mexico to face those charges. If the suspect is charged with terrorism, it would be the first time in history that Mexico issues a criminal charge of this nature for a crime committed in the U.S. In addition, it would guarantee Mexico access to information about the case. Ebrard also stated that the Mexican government would remain in contact with the victims' families throughout the investigation and trial, and that they would press charges against the individual(s) or firm who sold the weapons to the suspect. Former Mexican president Felipe Calderón offered his condolences on Twitter, and also directed a message against Trump. He said that notwithstanding if the attack was confirmed to be a hate crime or not, that Trump should stop his "hate speech" and "stigmatization".

=== International ===
UN Secretary-General António Guterres condemned "in the strongest terms the terrorist attack against Latinos on Saturday in the Texas city of El Paso" and called for everyone to work together to combat violence born of hate, racism and xenophobia. Recently the UN launched an action plan to "fight against discourses that incite hatred".

The incident was mentioned by Pope Francis during a speech in St. Peter's Square on August 4, in which he condemned attacks on defenseless people and said he was spiritually close to the victims, the wounded, and the families affected by the attacks that had "bloodied Texas, California, and Ohio". The Gilroy Garlic Festival shooting happened in California around a week before the El Paso shooting, while the 2019 Dayton shooting occurred in Ohio less than 24 hours after.

Uruguay and Venezuela issued travel warnings to avoid certain cities in America, including Baltimore, Detroit, Albuquerque, Cleveland, Memphis, Oakland, and Buffalo and citing "proliferation of acts of violence" and "growing indiscriminate violence, mostly for hate crimes, including racism and discrimination". Both countries warned their citizens to avoid any place with large crowds, including shopping malls, festivals, and "any kind of cultural or sporting events". Japan issued a similar travel warning, advising its citizens to pay attention to the potential for gunfire "everywhere" in the U.S., which they described as a "gun society". President Trump threatened undefined retaliation against countries and organizations that issue travel warnings on the United States because of gun violence.

== In popular culture ==
A meme featuring the Chudjak, whom Crusius's likeness was used for

On Guard: A Story of American Youth is 2023 documentary film directed by Allen Otto and executive produced by Jim Czarnecki. The film follows the journey of an all-female color guard team at Bel Air High School who aim to qualify for the 2020 WGI World Championships with a performance dedicated to the victims of the 2019 El Paso Shooting.

The El Paso shooting inspired the extensive book La frontera salvaje. 200 años de fanatismo anglosajón en América latina (2021) by Jorge Majfud.

Crusius's likeness was used for a meme, Chudjak, a variant of the Wojak internet meme. It was initially made to mock users of the 4chan /pol/ imageboard, going by the label of "le /pol/ face".

The Cuban American poet Richard Blanco quoted the shooting as a "catalyst" for his poem "The U.S. of Us", which is based on the text of "The Star-Spangled Banner" and questions the social status of Hispanics in the United States. He is quoted saying that "in the wake of the violence of the El Paso shooting, I felt an urgency to take a hard look at our place as Hispanics in the United States".

== See also ==
- 2019 Dayton shooting, another mass shooting that occurred just 13 hours after this one.
- Bærum mosque shooting
- Buffalo supermarket shooting, another racially motivated mass shooting influenced by the Christchurch mosque shootings which targeted African Americans
- Halle synagogue shooting
- List of massacres in the United States
- List of mass shootings in the United States
- List of shootings in Texas
- List of terrorist incidents in 2019
- Pittsburgh synagogue shooting
- Right-wing terrorism
- Starburst Lounge shooting, a mass shooting that happened in El Paso in 1980
- Terrorism in the United States
- Timeline of terrorist attacks in the United States
