= El Paso shooting =

El Paso shooting may refer to:

- 1980 Starburst Lounge shooting
- 2019 El Paso Walmart shooting
