= Pre-medical =

Education prior to formal medical school

Pre-medical (often referred to as pre-med) is an educational track that undergraduate students mostly in the United States pursue prior to becoming medical students. It involves activities that prepare a student for medical school, such as pre-med coursework, volunteer activities, clinical experience, research, and the application process. Some pre-med programs providing broad preparation are referred to as “pre-professional” and may simultaneously prepare students for entry into a variety of first professional degree or graduate school programs that require similar prerequisites (such as medical, veterinary, or pharmacy schools).

== In Australia ==
While the term "pre-med" is not used in Australia, a number of universities offer a three- or four-year Bachelor of Medical Science, Bachelor of Health Sciences or Biomedical Science degree, which is similar in content and aims to pre-med courses in the US.

In Australia, there are two pathways to becoming a doctor. One is undergraduate entry into medical school and another is graduate entry into medical school.

Undergraduate entry is available for graduates from year 12, or high school. And it requires 5-6 years to graduate.

Graduate entry requires previous tertiary education with at least a bachelor's degree. It requires 4 years to graduate.

In Australia, Bachelor of Medicine, Bachelor of Surgery (MBBS) and Doctor of Medicine (MD) are treated the same. Many universities that offered MBBS changed their academic degree's name to MD.

== In Italy ==
Italian medical schools last six years and do not require pre-med courses. Their course includes some biology, chemistry, and physics subjects, but they are not distinguished courses. These kinds of basic sciences are taught together with anatomy and physiology.

== In New Zealand ==
To enter a medical school in New Zealand, students require one year of a pre-medicine degree before applying to a medical school.

At the University of Auckland, students may choose one of the two pathways: one year of "biomedical science" or "health science".

To enter the medical school of the University of Otago, students have only one pathway: one year of "health science".

== In Poland ==
While there are no standardized pre-medical courses, some private institutions have been offering such in conjunction with the regular secondary school curriculum. For the medical universities, the primary factor by which the applications are gauged is the secondary school exit exam score, chiefly in biology and chemistry, though sometimes mathematics is also considered. High level exam scores receive a bonus coefficient upon the standard level.

== In Zambia ==
In Zambia, students interested in medical education may enter through different health science or medical degree pathways, depending on institutional admission requirements. Some institutions offer foundation or preparatory programmes for students who need to strengthen their background in science subjects before progressing to medical or health-related studies.

Medical and health science education in Zambia is offered by institutions such as the University of Zambia, Copperbelt University, and Texila American University Zambia. These institutions provide programmes in medicine, health sciences, or related preparatory pathways that support academic readiness for further study in healthcare fields.

== In South Korea ==
In South Korea, there are two types of medical schools. One is undergraduate entry into medical school and another is graduate entry into medical school.

Undergraduate entry is available to those who graduate from year 12, (high school) and requires 5-6 years to graduate.

Graduate entry requires previous tertiary education at least a bachelor's degree.

Undergraduate entry type medical schools are usually 6-year courses, which include 2-year pre-med courses.

== In the United States ==
=== Major ===
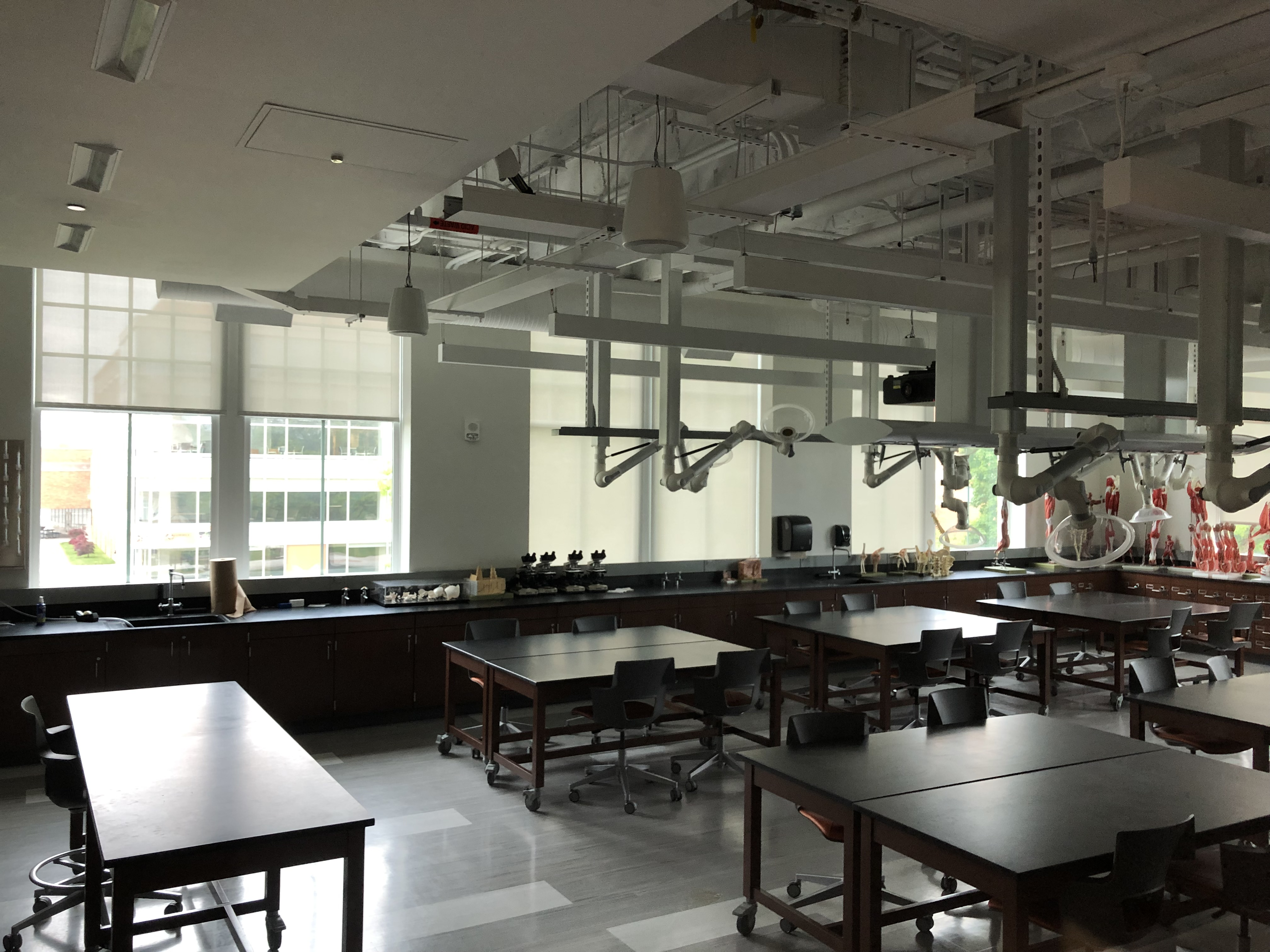
An anatomy lab often used by pre-med track students.

At most colleges and universities, students do not have the option of pre-medical academic major or minor. A student on a pre-med track may choose any undergraduate major in any field, so long as certain required courses are completed. Such courses are generally focused in the scientific fields of biology, chemistry, organic chemistry, neuroscience, behavioral sciences and physics, which are necessary to prepare for the Medical College Admission Test (MCAT) and satisfy most medical school prerequisites. It is for this reason students on a pre-med track generally undertake a major associated with one of those fields; however, an increasing number of students with a background in humanities have been applying in recent years, a situation applauded by medical schools. For example, Mount Sinai School of Medicine has created a program specifically for non-science majors. The Humanities and Medicine (HuMed) program admits undergraduates majoring in the humanities or social sciences without requiring the MCAT, or science coursework.

=== Pre-med timeline ===
Typical pre-med students will structure their coursework in their first year in university to accommodate the required courses. After a semester, many pursue extracurricular activities that demonstrate a commitment to medicine. Once junior year arrives, students register for and take the MCAT, the required standardized exam that medical schools use to identify qualified candidates. Once the test is taken, students apply to various schools using the automated American Medical College Application Service (AMCAS) system, American Association of Colleges of Osteopathic Medicine Application Service (AACOMAS) system, or in some cases, the school's own application system. AMCAS primary applications are verified by AMCAS staff, a process that often takes four to six weeks. The application process consists of a review of academic records, MCAT scores, activities, work experience, and a personal statement. Applicants can expect to hear from schools within a few months, at which point they may receive "secondary applications".

Different schools have different policies on sending secondary applications to students; many send secondary applications to all students, others screen applications prior to inviting an applicant to submit a secondary application. These applications are generated by each individual school. They generally contain essay questions that the applicant must answer to demonstrate that the applicant possesses qualities that the schools deem necessary to be a good medical student and physician. Qualified applicants can next expect to receive invitations to interview at schools. Upon completion of an interview and receipt of any additional application materials, the application is considered to be complete, and the student then waits for the school's decision to either accept or reject the student.

Some applicants receive admittance to medical school through a "post-baccalaureate" pre-medical program. These programs may be formal, such as the programs offered through Columbia, Johns Hopkins, George Washington, Mayo Clinic with Barrett, The Honors College, Bryn Mawr, Goucher and Scripps, or semi-formal, such as the program offered at Harvard, but often consist of a student informally enrolling in a college to complete science coursework required for admission to medical school prior to sitting for the MCAT. The Association of American Medical Colleges (AAMC) maintains a list of all formal and semi-formal post-baccalaureate pre-medical programs in the United States.

=== Coursework ===
The AAMC has created a list of required courses that every pre-med student must take. Each school is allowed to place its own further requirements.

The pre-medical coursework is offered at many American colleges and universities; however, it is considered to be a "track" that follows a certain curriculum. Most pre-medical students major in the natural and applied sciences, such as agricultural science, biology, chemistry, or physics, though this is not a requirement. Some pre-professional degree programs in agriculture prepare students for direct entry into the workforce in fields in high demand, while also meeting requirements for medical or veterinary schools. The latter curriculum model is meant to enhance employability of graduates awaiting admission or choosing not to attend professional or graduate school.

The courses that must be taken to meet the pre-medical requirements from the AAMC are three years, with one being in chemistry, one year of biology, and one year of physics. These course requirements are expected to change since the MR5 Committee, charged with revising the MCAT has created a new set of core competencies for success in medical education and practice. Those core competencies will include a greater emphasis on molecular genetics within the biology curriculum and will include biochemistry. In addition, the 2015 MCAT will test in areas related to multicultural sensitivity and in critical analysis of ethics and philosophy.

Many colleges of medicine and undergraduate pre-medical advising offices have yet to formalize pre-medical curricular recommendations. Though it did not address changes in the mathematics, physics, psychosocial or humanities portion of pre-medical education, the American Society for Biochemistry and Molecular Biology (ASBMB) developed a set of pre-medical curricular recommendations. ASBMB advocated that the year of biology includes genetics; that general and organic chemistry be taught with an orientation toward the chemistry of molecules encountered in living things; that one semester of biochemistry be required and two semesters of biochemistry be recommended; and that the laboratory course requirement can be taught in biology, chemistry or biochemistry, so long as research methods and data analysis are emphasized.

Pre-medical students may be advised or required to take upper-level biology and chemistry electives, such as cellular biology, physical chemistry, biochemistry, molecular biology and genetics. Specific requirements for these courses vary by institution. Organic Chemistry is one of the most popular upper-level courses. Schools may also have requirements for non-science classes. Some require a certain number of general humanities credits, while others have specific requirements for courses in English, psychology, or other desired disciplines.

=== Volunteering and clinical experiences ===
Many pre-medical students volunteer in a health care setting to explore the option of a career in medicine. Past volunteer experience can increase an applicant's chances of acceptance to a medical school. Often volunteer experiences are topics of discussion during medical school interviews. Some students "shadow" a physician, where the student follows a physician, directly observing the doctor as they care for patients.

=== Mental Health ===
Studies examining US undergraduate students pursuing the pre-medical track and corresponding mental health effects reveal complex but significant findings. While some surveys have found that academic stress scores showed little significant difference (P > 0.05) between pre-medical students and non-pre-medical students, pre-medical undergraduates have been found to report significantly elevated rates of clinical depression, emotional burnout, and career anxiety. For example, pre-medical undergraduates scored significantly higher on clinical measures of emotional exhaustion and depression severity measured via the PHQ-9, a depression screening questionnaire, in comparison to non-pre-med undergraduate students.

The associated psychological burden of the pre-med track greatly varies across college class and demographic group. Perceived stress tends to peak during junior year, as pre-medical juniors report increased feelings of being overwhelmed and stressed compared to their non-pre-medical peers. This increase in stress coincides with increasingly higher-level science prerequisites, MCAT preparation, and the start of the medical school application process. Women and non-binary pre-meds report significantly higher stress scores and emotional exhaustion compared to their pre-medical peers. One longitudinal study found that the connection between depression levels and declining medical career interest was strongest amongst women.

The effects of mental health on the future of pre-medical students is widespread with over 50% of students who leave the pre-med track claiming mental health to be the primary reason for leaving. In an effort to work towards reducing burnout and stress levels, students report that support from their professors directly boosts internal motivation and reinforces a strong work ethic helping to motivate and empower them to do well throughout their studies. Additionally, pre-med students overwhelmingly favor course policies and academic support offering extra credit and multiple submission attempts, alongside institutional assistance towards securing clinical shadowing and research experience, as ways to alleviate GPA anxiety and overall stress levels. Little research has tested mental health interventions specifically for pre-medical students as most interventional research has instead studied students already in medical school, as well as residents. As of 2012, researchers are calling for longitudinal studies to identify opportunities for prevention and intervention earlier in medical training.

== See also ==
- Pre-health sciences
- Flexner Report
- Medical school
- Doctor of Medicine
- Bachelor of Medicine, Bachelor of Surgery
- Residency (medicine)
- Internship (medicine)
