= Paso del Norte =

Paso del Norte may refer to:

- El Paso–Juárez, a binational metropolitan area
- El Paso, Texas, which grew from a small village called El Paso del Norte
- Paso del Norte, the name until 1888 of Ciudad Juárez, Mexico
- Hotel Paso del Norte, a historic hotel in El Paso, Texas
- Paso del Norte Health Foundation, an organization in El Paso, Texas
- Paso del Norte International Bridge, a bridge between Mexico and the United States
- Paso Del Norte Group, a civil organization in El Paso, Texas
- Paso del Norte (opera), a 2011 Mexican opera
