= Shiraz Maher =

English writer and analyst (born 1981)

- Born: 12 July 1981 (age 44); Birmingham, England
- Education: University of Leeds; University of Cambridge
- Occupations: Journalist, writer, analyst
- Known for: Criticism of Islamist extremism

Shiraz Maher (born 12 July 1981) is a British writer and analyst, and Director at the International Centre for the Study of Radicalisation and Political Violence (ICSR) at King's College London. He also teaches at Johns Hopkins University. The son of Pakistani immigrants, for several years after 9/11 Maher was a member of the Islamist organisation Hizb ut-Tahrir, but left the movement after the 2005 London bombings and became an outspoken critic of radical Islam. He has written for leading newspapers in Britain and elsewhere, produced reports and studies on counterterrorism strategy, and appeared in the international news media as a commentator on jihad and radicalisation.

== Early life ==
Maher was born in 1981 in Birmingham to British-Pakistani parents. His father was an accountant, and when Shiraz was an infant the family moved to Saudi Arabia. He stated he had never been very concerned about Saudi culture, noting he "lived in a Western compound, with everything you could want: tennis courts, swimming pools, cricket, basketball, bike races, all gender-mixed.”

One day when he was eleven, he was wearing a Daffy Duck T-shirt bearing the slogan "I Support Operation Desert Storm" and a Saudi man challenged him about the sentiment. "I said, 'Why not? Saddam's a terrible man.' The man said: 'No. This is an American conspiracy. These people use us as an excuse to establish bases on holy soil.'”

In 1995, when he was age 14, Maher moved back to Britain. He attended Solihull School from 1995 to 2000. In 2000, he enrolled at the University of Leeds.

== Radical phase ==
Reacting to the attacks on 9/11, Maher thought to himself that America deserved the attacks as reciprocation for meddling with the affairs of the Arab world, and supporting Israel. "You shall reap what you sow, and this is what you've sown for a long time." He later said that 9/11 "activated" latent anti-American ideas he had picked up in Saudi Arabia. After the attacks, he gave up alcohol, ended his relationship with his girlfriend, and joined Hizb ut-Tahrir. By the time the US invaded Afghanistan, Maher had recovered his Muslim faith and moved into an apartment across the street from a local mosque.

He became a graduate student at University of Cambridge. Meanwhile, he rose in ranks at Hizb ut-Tahrir, advancing from cell leader to regional director. He was even invited to join the group's British executive committee. In 2005, however, he began to hold doubts about Hizb ut-Tahrir. At Cambridge, he encountered numerous sects of Islam and decided that Hizb ut-Tahrir's ideology was erroneous and led to terrorism. He left Hizb ut-Tahrir on 7 July 2005, the day the London Underground bombings took place, killing 52 people.

== Post-radical years ==
After leaving radical Islam, Maher dedicated his life to opposing jihad. For a time, he ran Standpoint magazine's "Focus on Islamism" blog with Alexander Meleagrou-Hitchens. He produced a television program for BBC's Panorama entitled "How I became a Muslim extremist." He also worked for Policy Exchange, writing a series of studies on national security. His report on reforming the government's counter-terrorism strategy was praised by both Michael Gove, then Britain's Secretary of State for Education, and Lord Guthrie of Craigiebank, former Chief of the Defence Staff.

Maher is today a senior fellow at the International Centre for the Study of Radicalisation, King's College London, where "he researches Europe's homegrown Islamist movement and profiles the droves of young Britons who are decamping for Syria and Iraq to wage jihad with ISIS, aka the Islamic State of Iraq and al-Sham." He also researches the development of Salafi jihadism ideology, and jihadist organisations in the broader Middle East. As a result of this research he has been invited to give evidence before three parliamentary committees. In addition, Maher works as an adjunct at Johns Hopkins University, where he co-teaches a course on radicalisation with Peter Neumann. He was a visiting lecturer at Washington College during the spring semester of 2012.

== Views ==
Maher has said that the British government spent years ignoring the radicalisation of a generation of British Muslims. "In the late 1980s, early '90s," he said, "this country opened its doors to radical Islamist preachers from around the world who began to preach a very hard-line, totalitarian message about what Islam should look like." Sohrab Ahmari wrote in the Wall Street Journal that, thanks in part to Maher's efforts, "the British branch of Hizbut Tahrir has been decimated ... Hizbut Tahrir rallies used to draw 20,000 supporters. Today 'they struggle to get 1,000.'"

Maher has stated, "Did bin Laden win? Yes. He did not want there to be a strong hand in the region for the world's greatest and most powerful force for good—the United States. And voluntarily, we chose to disengage, and watched as these radical millenarians came in and took over ... This is a disgrace and a humiliation."

== Honors and awards ==
Maher was awarded the first Konrad Adenauer Foundation Fellowship in Energy Security (2012-2013). He was a fellow at the European Centre for Energy and Resource Security (EUCERS) where he explored the impact of political unrest in the Middle East on energy markets.

He was shortlisted for the Orwell Prize in 2016 for his 2015 articles in The Guardian and New Statesman.

== Publications ==
Maher's articles have appeared in Standpoint, Foreign Affairs, The Telegraph, The Guardian, The Spectator, The Wall Street Journal, The Independent, The Daily Mail, Haaretz, The Jewish Chronicle, and The New Statesman, and on the websites of BBC News and the Gatestone Institute. His reports and studies include the following:

- Salafi-Jihadism: The History of an Idea, Hurst Publ. (April 2016).
- "Greenbirds: Measuring Importance and Influence in Syrian Foreign Fighter Networks", ICSR (April 2014; co-authored with Joseph Carter and Peter Neumann).
- "The Arab Spring and its impact on supply and production in global markets", European Centre for Energy and Resource Security, (October 2013).
- "Between ‘engagement’ and a ‘values-led’ approach: Britain and the Muslim Brotherhood from 9/11 to the Arab Spring, in Western reactions to the rise of Islamists in the MENA" (Al-Mesbar, January 2013; co-authored with Martyn Frampton).
- "Change and Continuity: Hizb ut Tahrir’s strategy and ideology in Britain, in Revisionism and Diversification in New Religious Movements" (Ashgate, October 2013).
- "Al-Qaeda at the crossroads: how the terror group is responding to the loss of its leaders and the Arab Spring", ICSR (August 2012; co-authored with Peter Neumann).
- "Lights, Camera, Jihad: Al-Shabaab’s Western media strategy", ICSR (November 2012; co-authored with Alexander Meleagrou-Hitchens and James Sheehan).
- "Preventing Violent Extremism: Lessons from the Government’s revised ‘Prevent’ Strategy", World Defence Systems (September 2011).
- "Ties that Bind: How the story of Muslim soldiers can forge a national identity", Policy Exchange (September 2011).
- "Choosing our friends wisely: criteria for engagement with Muslim groups", Policy Exchange (April 2009; co-authored with Martyn Frampton)
- Mapping contemporary Salafi-Jihadism, Fathom, Summer 2016
