= Texas Medical & Dental Schools Application Service =

The Texas Medical & Dental Schools Application Service (TMDSAS) is a service run by the University of Texas System through which prospective professional students can use a common application to apply to all public medical, dental and veterinary schools in the state of Texas.

Applicants to public Texas medical schools must apply through TMDSAS, unlike schools in other U.S. states which use the American Medical College Application Service (AMCAS) or the American Association of Colleges of Osteopathic Medicine Application Service (AACOMAS).

The Texas Medical & Dental Schools Application Service is located in Austin, Texas.

== Participating Schools ==
MEDICAL
Baylor College of Medicine
Long School of Medicine at UT Health San Antonio
McGovern Medical School at UT Health Houston
Sam Houston State University College of Osteopathic Medicine
Texas A&M College of Medicine
Texas Tech University Health Sciences Center Paul L. Foster School of Medicine at El Paso
Texas Tech University Health Science Center School of Medicine at Lubbock
University of Houston College of Medicine
University of North Texas Health Science Center Texas College of Osteopathic Medicine
The University of Texas at Austin Dell Medical School
The University of Texas Medical Branch at Galveston
The University of Texas Rio Grande Valley School of Medicine
The University of Texas Southwestern Medical School

DENTAL
Texas A&M University College of Dentistry
Texas Tech University Woody L. Hunt School of Dental Medicine
The University of Texas Health San Antonio School of Dentistry
The University of Texas Health School Of Dentistry at Houston

VETERINARY
Texas A&M University College of Veterinary Medicine
Texas Tech University School of Veterinary Medicine
