= Salafi-Jihadism: The History of an Idea =

2016 book by Shiraz Maher

- Author: Shiraz Maher
- Publisher: C. Hurst & Co.
- Publication date: 2015

Salafi-Jihadism: The History of an Idea is a 2016 book by British policy analyst Shiraz Maher.

Salafi-Jihadism focuses on the religious basis of jihadism. According to Maher, Salafi jihadism is based on five doctrines of faith: jihad in the sense of holy war, tawhid, (the oneness of God), hakimiyya (meaning true Islamic government), al-wala wal-bara (loyalty to divine truth and rejection of untruth and polytheism), and takfir (the naming of disbelievers).

The Guardian newspaper describes Salafi-Jihadism as one of "the best books to understand modern terrorism," describing it as providing "insight into the theological frameworks adopted by many proponents of terror today without falling into arcane arguments about Islamic law."

== Synopsis ==
According to Maher, the key to understanding Salafi-jihadism is to understand how this ideology interprets the five ideological pillars of the faith.

Maher traces the origins of this particular strain of Islam to the medieval scholar Ibn Taymiyyah and the 18th century scholar Muhammad ibn Abd al-Wahhab.

=== Jihad ===
Jihad is understood as the means by which the millenarian vision of Salafi-jihad will be realized. Military jihad, a holy war, will overturn existing governments and create a worldwide a global Islamic utopia.
