= American Association of Colleges of Osteopathic Medicine Application Service =

Service for application to U.S. Osteopathic medical schools

- Abbreviation: AACOMAS
- Founder: American Association of Colleges of Osteopathic Medicine
- Location: United States

The American Association of Colleges of Osteopathic Medicine Application Service (AACOMAS) is a service run by the American Association of Colleges of Osteopathic Medicine through which prospective osteopathic medical students can apply to osteopathic medical schools in the United States that grant the Doctor of Osteopathic Medicine degree.

Medical schools in the United States that grant the Doctor of Medicine degree use either the American Medical College Application Service (AMCAS) or the Texas Medical & Dental Schools Application Service (TMDSAS). Sam Houston State University College of Osteopathic Medicine and the University of North Texas Health Science Center Texas College of Osteopathic Medicine are the only osteopathic medical schools that do not use AACOMAS.

== Participating osteopathic medical schools ==
State	School	City	Est	Notes
Alabama	Alabama College of Osteopathic Medicine	Dothan	2013	
Arizona	A.T. Still University School of Osteopathic Medicine in Arizona	Mesa	2007	
Arizona	Midwestern University Arizona College of Osteopathic Medicine	Glendale	1995	
California	Touro University California College of Osteopathic Medicine	Vallejo	1997	
California	Western University of Health Sciences College of Osteopathic Medicine of the Pacific	Pomona	1977	
Colorado	Rocky Vista University College of Osteopathic Medicine	Parker	2008	
Florida	Lake Erie College of Osteopathic Medicine at Bradenton	Bradenton	2004	
Florida	Nova Southeastern University College of Osteopathic Medicine	Davie	1979	
Georgia	Philadelphia College of Osteopathic Medicine - Georgia Campus	Atlanta	2005	
Illinois	Midwestern University Chicago College of Osteopathic Medicine	Downers Grove	1900	
Indiana	Marian University College of Osteopathic Medicine	Indianapolis	2010	
Iowa	Des Moines University College of Osteopathic Medicine	Des Moines	1898	
Kentucky	University of Pikeville Kentucky College of Osteopathic Medicine	Pikeville	1997	
Michigan	Michigan State University College of Osteopathic Medicine	East Lansing, Detroit, Clinton Township	1969	
Maine	University of New England College of Osteopathic Medicine	Portland	1978	
Mississippi	William Carey University College of Osteopathic Medicine	Hattiesburg	2009	
Missouri	A. T. Still University Kirksville College of Osteopathic Medicine	Kirksville	1892	
Missouri	Kansas City University of Medicine and Biosciences College of Osteopathic Medicine	Kansas City	1916	
Nevada	Touro University Nevada College of Osteopathic Medicine	Henderson	2004	
New Jersey	Rowan-Virtua School of Osteopathic Medicine	Stratford	1976	
New York	New York Institute of Technology New York College of Osteopathic Medicine	Old Westbury	1977	
New York	Touro College of Osteopathic Medicine	Manhattan	2007	
North Carolina	Campbell University School of Osteopathic Medicine	Buies Creek	2011	
Ohio	Ohio University College of Osteopathic Medicine	Athens	1975	
Oklahoma	Oklahoma State University Center for Health Sciences College of Osteopathic Medicine	Tulsa	1972	
Oregon	College of Osteopathic Medicine of the Pacific, Northwest	Lebanon	2011	
Pennsylvania	Lake Erie College of Osteopathic Medicine	Erie	1992	
Pennsylvania	Philadelphia College of Osteopathic Medicine	Philadelphia	1899	
South Carolina	Virginia College of Osteopathic Medicine: Carolinas Campus	Spartanburg	2010	
Tennessee	Lincoln Memorial University DeBusk College of Osteopathic Medicine	Harrogate	2007	
Virginia	Edward Via College of Osteopathic Medicine	Blacksburg	2002	
Washington	Pacific Northwest University of Health Sciences	Yakima	2005	
West Virginia	West Virginia School of Osteopathic Medicine	Lewisburg	1974	
