= International Centre for the Study of Radicalisation and Political Violence =

UK-based think tank

The International Centre for the Study of Radicalisation
- Successor: Centre for Statecraft and National Security
- Founded: January 2008
- Dissolved: September 2025
- Type: Non-profit think tank
- Location: London
- Website: icsr.info

The International Centre for the Study of Radicalisation and Political Violence (ICSR) was a non-profit, non-governmental think tank based in the Department of War Studies at King's College London. It obtained some of its funding through the European Union.

The organisation was a partnership of five academic institutions: King's College London, the University of Pennsylvania, the Interdisciplinary Center Herzliya (Israel), the Jordan Institute of Diplomacy, and Georgetown University.

ICSR became known for its research on Islamist militancy, right-wing extremism, and the financing of terrorist networks, as well as for publishing datasets on foreign fighters in Iraq and Syria.

Since summer 2020, the ICSR was a member of the Global Network on Extremism and Technology together with the Peace Research Institute Frankfurt, the George Washington University's Program on Extremism (PoE), the S. Rajaratnam School of International Studies' Centre of Excellence for National Security (CENS) and the Lowy Institute.

In 2025 ICSR merged with the Centre for Grand Strategy to form the Centre for Statecraft and National Security. It is still part of the Department of War Studies at King’s College London.

== Launch and role ==
ICSR was launched in January 2008 at the First International Conference on Radicalisation and Political Violence in London. During this conference, UK Home Secretary Jacqui Smith launched the government's new anti-terror initiative.

In addition to undertaking research, ICSR hosted speakers from around the world. In the past these have included US Senator Chuck Hagel, Vice-President of Colombia Francisco Santos Calderon, former President of Ireland Mary Robinson, Secretary-General of the Council of Europe Terry Davis as well as several prominent terrorism experts and commentators featured as panelists including BBC's Frank Gardner, Olivier Roy, Peter Bergen of the New America Foundation, Richard Dearlove (former head of MI6) and Daniel Benjamin of the Brookings Institution.

== Research ==
A report published by the ICSR in 2023, showed data on the support by children terrorist networks and displayed the potential threats that they possess. The report showed that from 2016 to 2023 in the UK 43 individuals were convicted of committing terrorist offences as a minor, in which 42 of them were boys and the youngest was 13 years old at the time of the offence.

In 2019, Peter R. Neumann told CNN that the ICSR had seen an increase in right-wing terrorist violence and hate crimes in Western countries over the past five years.

The ICSR published a report in 2018 stating that between April 2013 and June 2018, 41,490 international citizens from 80 different countries had joined the Islamic State in Iraq and Syria. It also stated that about 25% of the international citizens affiliated to ISIS were women and children.

In August 2017, ICSR published a report on the impact of Turkey's conflict with the PKK on the Syrian Civil War and Iraqi Kurdistan.

In February 2017, the think tank produced an estimate on the Islamic State's financial fortunes. In the same month, ICSR released a report on the Islamic State's doctrine of information warfare.

In October 2016, ICSR published a report on European jihadists and the crime-terror nexus.

In previous years, reports by the ICSR ranged from the topics such as the narratives of Islamic State defectors, to neo-Nationalist networks.

In addition to reports, the organisation also regularly published papers as well as short pieces of analysis, called "ICSR Insights", on their website. Its research fellows often featured as contributors to media pieces.

== Governance ==
The Founding Director of ICSR was Prof. Peter R. Neumann; the Director was Dr. Shiraz Maher.

The organisation's governance structure included a board of trustees. Past members of the board included:

- Lord James Bethell
- Rt. Hon. Kim Campbell
- Marc Fleischman (Chairman)
- Prof. Lawrence Freedman
- Jeremy Sacher

Further, ICSR was affiliated with TRENDS Research and Advisory, the Pakistan Institute for Peace Studies in Islamabad, and the Centre for Policy Research, New Delhi.

== Controversies ==
- Netherlands' newspaper NRC Handelsblad on 19 November 2014 interviewed Shiraz Maher, then 'coordinator of the research' of the organisation, about his insights on European jihadists joining Islamic State in Syria, their motives, etc. Maher advocates to give those jihadists who after several months decide to return home to Europe, a fair chance: "Of course, some of those people are truly evil--those you must arrest the second they step out of the plane." But "not everyone going to Syria is a terrorist". "You must give those who want to step out of it, a chance to do so, otherwise they'll remain jihadist the rest of their lives".
- The organisation has been accused of inaccuracy in its April 2014 report '#Greenbirds: Measuring Importance and Influence in Syrian Foreign Fighter Networks'. The report claimed that one of the subjects studied in the report was based in the West, whereas he denied this via his Twitter page and clarified that he had not been based in the West at all since the study was said to have begun.

== Merger ==
In 2025 ICSR merged with the Centre for Grand Strategy to form the Centre for Statecraft and National Security, based in the Department of War Studies at King's College, London.

Kings College London has described the Centre for Statecraft and National Security (CSNS) as the successor to ICSR in course materials related to terrorism and security studies.

Following the merger, several projects and initiatives previously associated with ICSR continued under CSNS, including the Global Network on Extremism and Technology (GNET) of which ICSR had been a member since 2020, and the Respository of Extremist-Aligned Documents (READ).

In 2025, the Global Internet Forum to Counter Terrorism (GIFCT) described GNET as being convened and led by CSNS.
