= University Medical Center of El Paso =

- El Paso County Hospital District
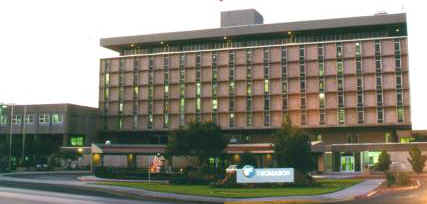

Geography
- Location: 4815 Alameda Ave. El Paso, Texas, Texas, United States
- Coordinates: 31.771925°N 106.434951°W

Organization
- Care system: Public
- Type: General and Teaching
- Affiliated university: Paul L. Foster School of Medicine

Services
- Emergency department: Level I trauma center
- Beds: 394

Helipads
- Helipad: FAA LID: TA41

History
- Founded: 1963

Links
- Website: umcelpaso.org
- Lists: Hospitals in Texas

El Paso County Hospital District, doing business as University Medical Center of El Paso, is a non-profit public hospital in El Paso, Texas. University Medical Center is licensed by the State of Texas and accredited by the Joint Commission. Since the early 1990s, the White House has designated Thomason as the hospital where the President, Vice President and former Presidents of the United States will be treated should they require medical care while traveling in the region. University Medical Center also provides financial assistance to people in need. Free or discounted healthcare services are available to El Paso County residents who meet eligibility guidelines.

== History ==
University Medical Center first opened as El Paso General Hospital in 1915, in a two-story, adobe building located west of downtown El Paso. One year later, the hospital was moved to 4815 Alameda Avenue in El Paso. In the 1950s, voters created the El Paso County Hospital District, which would govern the General Hospital, agreeing to be taxed to support the District which would also provide indigent care. Voters also authorized the construction of the current facility and the hospital was renamed R.E. Thomason General Hospital after former El Paso Mayor, U.S. Congressman and Federal Judge, R. Ewing Thomason.

Thomason Hospital officially changed its name to University Medical Center of El Paso on Monday, July 13, 2009. One hospital building will retain the Thomason name as "Thomason Tower".

== Administration ==
University Medical Center is overseen by a seven-member panel called the Board of Managers. They are appointed to their posts by El Paso's County Judge and Commissioners to be policy setters for Thomason and its outpatient facilities. They are also responsible for hiring the hospital's Chief Executive Officer. Board members serve two-year terms and are not paid for the work they do on behalf of the county hospital. This is the main teaching hospital of the Paul L. Foster School of Medicine at Texas Tech University Health Sciences Center at El Paso.

== Controversies ==
On Dec. 8, 2012, an American citizen was crossing the border to return home to the US and Customs and Border Protection officers stopped her. She presented her passport to them and did not have any illegal drugs or contraband. She was then taken into custody and repeatedly searched in an increasingly intrusive manner. According to court documents, "First, two female agents conducted a pat down. The agents found no drugs. The agents then held (her) for a K-9 search. The K-9 failed to alert to the presence of drugs. Two agents then took (her) to a restroom, where they ordered her to pull down her pants and underwear and bend over slightly. The agents conducted a visual inspection of (her) vaginal and anal area. Again, the agents found no drugs. Despite no evidence of drugs, the agents placed tape on (her) legs and abdomen, handcuffed her, and transported her to the University Medical Center (the “Hospital”) in El Paso. " There, two male doctors forced a pelvic exam, a rectal exam and an x-ray on her which she did not consent to, in front of other hospital personnel. At no time were drugs found. University Medical Center then charged her $5,000. The Fifth Court of Appeals found that the hospital staff had no liability under district court dismissing the Appellant's claims based on qualified immunity.

In March 2020 the hospital reprimanded a physician for wearing a surgical mask outside a patient care areas during the COVID-19 pandemic. The warning was sent by the head of anesthesia who referred to the disease as the "Wuhan virus".

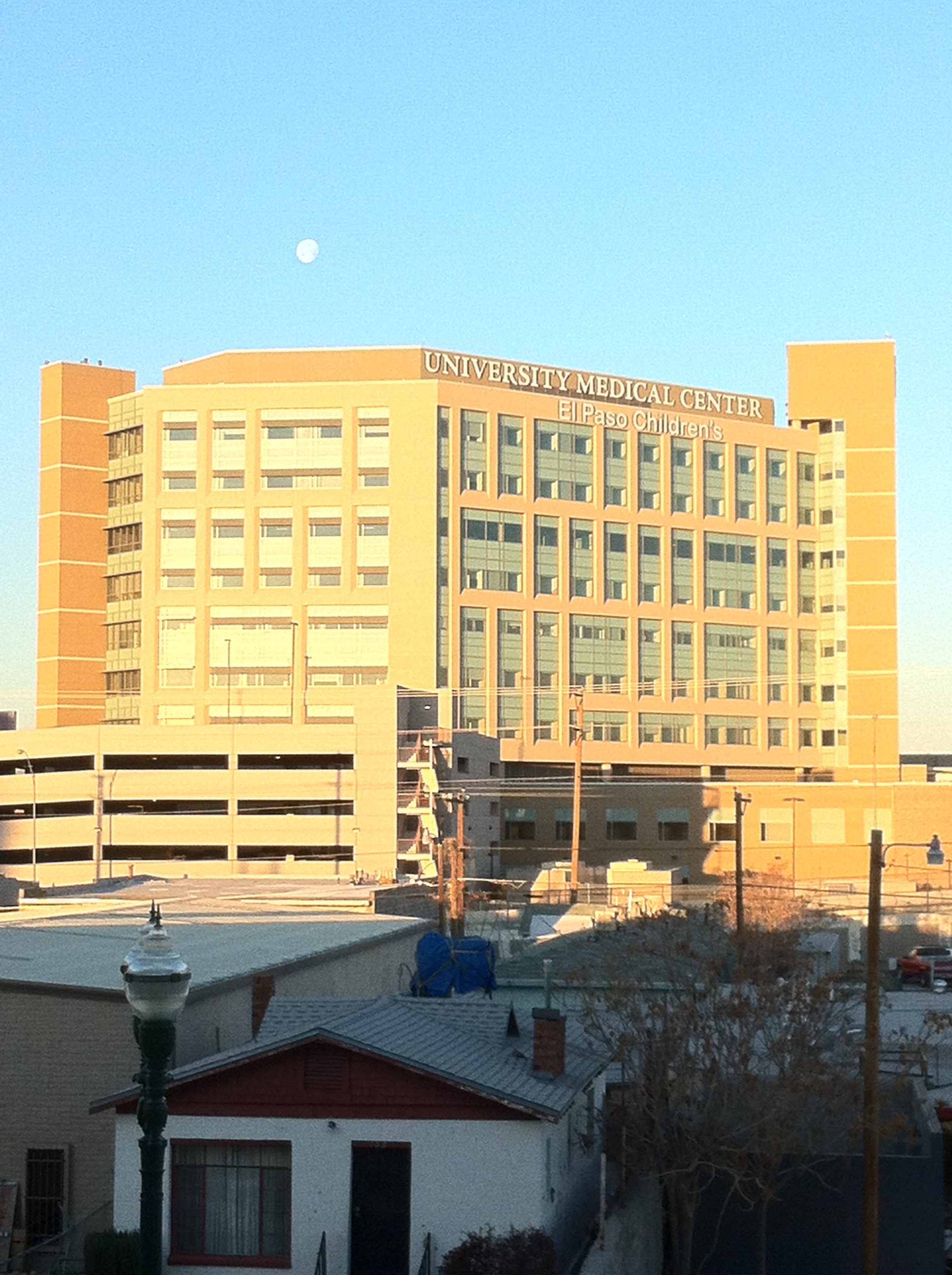
El Paso Children's Hospital, completed February, 2012.
