= American Medical College Application Service =

Applicant portal for prospective medical students in the U.S.

The American Medical College Application Service (AMCAS) is a service run by the Association of American Medical Colleges through which prospective medical students can apply to various medical schools in the United States. It thus acts as something of a Common Application among the schools.

Most US medical schools granting Doctor of Medicine (M.D.) degrees require that students apply through AMCAS. However, there are seven M.D. schools that do not participate in AMCAS. These schools use the Texas Medical & Dental Schools Application Service (TMDSAS). There are a total of 141 M.D. granting medical schools in the U.S. that use AMCAS, which includes 4 Puerto Rico schools.

Osteopathic medical schools (granting Doctor of Osteopathic Medicine, or D.O., degrees) have a similar system called the American Association of Colleges of Osteopathic Medicine Application Service (AACOMAS).

In 2020, The Association of American Medical Colleges shortens the Medical College Admission Test (MCAT) to rule out experimental issues.

== Services ==
- AMCAS Letter Service - All letters are to be submitted through AMCAS.
- Criminal Background Check Service - The Association of American Medical Colleges proposes that all U.S. medical schools, after conditional admission to medical school, have a nationwide background search on candidates.

== Participating medical schools ==
State	School	City	Est	Notes
Alabama	University of Alabama School of Medicine	Birmingham & Tuscaloosa & Huntsville & Selma	1859	
Alabama	University of South Alabama College of Medicine	Mobile	1972	
Arizona	University of Arizona College of Medicine-Phoenix	Phoenix	2007	
Arizona	University of Arizona College of Medicine-Tucson	Tucson	1967	
Arkansas	University of Arkansas for Medical Sciences/UAMS College of Medicine	Little Rock	1879	
California	Keck School of Medicine of University of Southern California	Los Angeles	1885	
California	Loma Linda University School of Medicine	Loma Linda	1909	
California	Stanford University School of Medicine	Palo Alto and San Francisco	1908	
California	UC San Diego School of Medicine	San Diego	1968	
California	UC Davis School of Medicine	Sacramento	1966	
California	University of California, Irvine School of Medicine	Irvine	1896	
California	David Geffen School of Medicine at UCLA	Los Angeles	1951	offers UCLA program, UCLA PRIME program, UCLA/UCR Thomas Haider program, UCLA/DREW program
California	University of California, San Francisco School of Medicine	San Francisco	1873	
Colorado	University of Colorado School of Medicine	Aurora	1883	
Connecticut	University of Connecticut School of Medicine	Farmington	1961	
Connecticut	Yale University School of Medicine	New Haven	1810	
District of Columbia	George Washington University Medical School	Washington	1824	
District of Columbia	Georgetown University School of Medicine	Washington	1851	
District of Columbia	Howard University College of Medicine	Washington	1867	
Florida	Florida International University College of Medicine	Miami	2006	
Florida	Florida State University College of Medicine	Tallahassee	2000	
Florida	University of Miami Miller School of Medicine	Miami	1952	
Florida	Florida Atlantic University Schmidt College of Medicine	Boca Raton	2010	
Florida	University of Central Florida College of Medicine	Orlando	2006	
Florida	University of Florida College of Medicine	Gainesville & Jacksonville	1956	
Florida	University of South Florida College of Medicine	Tampa	1971	
Georgia	Emory University School of Medicine	Atlanta	1915	
Georgia	Georgia Regents University Medical College of Georgia	Augusta & Athens	1828	Offers two tracks, one in its main campus in Augusta and another in Athens in partnership with the University of Georgia
Georgia	Mercer University School of Medicine	Macon	1982	
Georgia	Morehouse School of Medicine	Atlanta	1975	
Hawaii	University of Hawaii John A. Burns School of Medicine	Honolulu	1973	
Illinois	Rosalind Franklin University - Chicago Medical School	North Chicago	1912	
Illinois	Northwestern University Feinberg School of Medicine	Chicago	1859	
Illinois	University of Chicago Pritzker School of Medicine	Chicago	1927	
Illinois	Rush Medical College	Chicago	1837	
Illinois	Southern Illinois University School of Medicine	Springfield	1970	
Illinois	Loyola University Chicago Stritch School of Medicine	Maywood	1915	
Illinois	University of Illinois College of Medicine	Chicago	1882	Boasts a multi-campus medical school in Chicago, Urbana, Peoria, & Rockford
Indiana	Indiana University School of Medicine	Indianapolis	1903	Boasts a multi-campus medical school in 9 regional campuses (Indianapolis, Bloomington, Fort Wayne, Terre Haute, South Bend, Lafayette, Gary, Evansville, and Muncie)
Iowa	The University of Iowa Roy J. and Lucille A. Carver College of Medicine	Iowa City	1869	
Kansas	University of Kansas School of Medicine	Kansas City	1880	
Kentucky	University of Kentucky College of Medicine	Lexington	1960	
Kentucky	University of Louisville School of Medicine	Louisville	1837	
Louisiana	Louisiana State University School of Medicine in New Orleans	New Orleans	1931	
Louisiana	Louisiana State University School of Medicine in Shreveport	Shreveport	1969	
Louisiana	Tulane University School of Medicine	New Orleans	1834	
Maryland	Johns Hopkins University School of Medicine	Baltimore	1887	
Maryland	Uniformed Services University of the Health Sciences F. Edward Hebert School of Medicine	Bethesda	1972	
Maryland	University of Maryland School of Medicine	Baltimore	1807	
Massachusetts	Boston University School of Medicine	Boston	1848	
Massachusetts	Harvard Medical School	Boston	1782	
Massachusetts	Tufts University School of Medicine	Boston	1893	
Massachusetts	University of Massachusetts Medical School	Worcester	1962	
Michigan	Covenant HealthCare College of Medicine at Central Michigan University	Mount Pleasant	2012	Was previously Central Michigan University College of Medicine
Michigan	Michigan State University College of Human Medicine	East Lansing, Grand Rapids	1964	
Michigan	University of Michigan Medical School	Ann Arbor	1850	
Michigan	Oakland University William Beaumont School of Medicine	Rochester	2011	
Michigan	Wayne State University School of Medicine	Detroit	1868	
Michigan	Western Michigan University Homer Stryker M.D. School of Medicine	Kalamazoo	2012	
Minnesota	Mayo Clinic College of Medicine	Rochester	1972	
Minnesota	University of Minnesota Medical School	Minneapolis	1888	
Mississippi	University of Mississippi School of Medicine	Jackson	1903	
Missouri	Saint Louis University School of Medicine	St. Louis	1901	
Missouri	University of Missouri-Columbia School of Medicine	Columbia	1845	
Missouri	Washington University School of Medicine	St. Louis	1891	
Missouri	University of Missouri-Kansas City School of Medicine	Kansas City	1929	
Nebraska	Creighton University School of Medicine	Omaha	1892	
Nebraska	University of Nebraska College of Medicine	Omaha	1881	
Nevada	University of Nevada, Reno School of Medicine	Reno	1969	
Nevada	UNLV School of Medicine	Las Vegas	2014	
New Hampshire	Dartmouth Medical School	Hanover	1797	
New Jersey	University of Medicine and Dentistry of New Jersey – New Jersey Medical School	Newark	1954	
New Jersey	University of Medicine and Dentistry of New Jersey – Robert Wood Johnson Medical School	Piscataway, New Brunswick, & Camden	1961	
New Jersey	Cooper Medical School at Rowan University	Camden	2012	
New Mexico	University of New Mexico School of Medicine	Albuquerque	1961	
New York	Albany Medical College	Albany	1838	
New York	Albert Einstein College of Medicine of Yeshiva University	Bronx	1955	
New York	Columbia University College of Physicians and Surgeons	Manhattan	1767	
New York	Hofstra University North Shore–LIJ School of Medicine	Hempstead	2010	
New York	Mount Sinai School of Medicine	Manhattan	1963	
New York	New York Medical College	Valhalla	1858	
New York	New York University School of Medicine	Manhattan	1841	
New York	State University of New York at Stony Brook School of Medicine	Stony Brook	1971	
New York	State University of New York Upstate Medical University	Syracuse	1834	
New York	State University of New York Downstate Medical Center College of Medicine	Brooklyn	1858	
New York	University at Buffalo, The State University of New York School of Medicine & Biomedical Sciences	Buffalo	1846	
New York	University of Rochester School of Medicine and Dentistry	Rochester	1925	
New York	Weill Cornell Medical College of Cornell University	Manhattan	1898	
North Carolina	Brody School of Medicine at East Carolina University	Greenville	1977	
North Carolina	Duke University School of Medicine	Durham	1930	
North Carolina	University of North Carolina School of Medicine	Chapel Hill	1879	
North Carolina	Wake Forest School of Medicine	Winston-Salem	1902	
North Dakota	University of North Dakota School of Medicine and Health Sciences	Grand Forks	1905	
Ohio	The Wright State University Boonshoft School of Medicine	Dayton	1973	
Ohio	Case Western Reserve University School of Medicine	Cleveland	1843	Offers a 5-year physician-scientist program in collaboration with Cleveland Clinic named Cleveland Clinic Lerner College of Medicine
Ohio	Northeast Ohio Medical University	Rootstown	1973	
Ohio	The Ohio State University College of Medicine	Columbus	1914	
Ohio	University of Cincinnati College of Medicine	Cincinnati	1819	
Ohio	University of Toledo College of Medicine	Toledo	1964	
Oklahoma	University of Oklahoma College of Medicine	Oklahoma City	1900	
Oregon	Oregon Health & Science University School of Medicine	Portland	1887	
Pennsylvania	The Commonwealth Medical College	Scranton	2008	
Pennsylvania	Drexel University College of Medicine	Philadelphia	1848	
Pennsylvania	Jefferson Medical College of Thomas Jefferson University	Philadelphia	1825	
Pennsylvania	Pennsylvania State University College of Medicine	Hershey	1963	
Pennsylvania	Perelman School of Medicine at the University of Pennsylvania	Philadelphia	1765	
Pennsylvania	Temple University School of Medicine	Philadelphia,	1901	Will offers three programs by 2013, one in Philadelphia, one in Pittsburgh (begins 2013), and one in Bethlehem (begins 2011)
Pennsylvania	University of Pittsburgh School of Medicine	Pittsburgh	1886	
Puerto Rico	Universidad Central del Caribe School of Medicine	Bayamón	1976	
Puerto Rico	Ponce School of Medicine	Ponce	1977	
Puerto Rico	San Juan Bautista School of Medicine	Caguas	1978	
Puerto Rico	University of Puerto Rico School of Medicine	San Juan	1950	
Rhode Island	Warren Alpert Medical School of Brown University	Providence	1811	
South Carolina	Medical University of South Carolina College of Medicine	Charleston	1823	
South Carolina	University of South Carolina School of Medicine	Columbia	1977	
South Dakota	Sanford School of Medicine of the University of South Dakota	Vermillion	1907	
Tennessee	East Tennessee State University James H. Quillen College of Medicine	Johnson City	1978	
Tennessee	Meharry Medical College School of Medicine	Nashville	1876	
Tennessee	University of Tennessee College of Medicine	Memphis	1911	
Tennessee	Vanderbilt University School of Medicine	Nashville	1874	
Texas	Baylor College of Medicine	Houston	1900	
Texas	Texas A&M Health Science Center College of Medicine	College Station	1977	MD/PhD program only through AMCAS
Texas	Texas Tech University Health Sciences Center Paul L. Foster School of Medicine	El Paso	2008	D/PhD program only through AMCAS
Texas	Texas Tech University Health Sciences Center School of Medicine	Lubbock	1969	MD/PhD program only through AMCAS
Texas	University of Texas Medical School at Houston	Houston	1972	MD/PhD program only through AMCAS
Texas	University of Texas Medical School at San Antonio	San Antonio	1959	MD/PhD program only through AMCAS
Texas	University of Texas Medical Branch School of Medicine	Galveston	1891	MD/PhD program only through AMCAS
Texas	University of Texas Southwestern Medical School at Dallas	Dallas	1943	MD/PhD program only through AMCAS
Utah	University of Utah School of Medicine	Salt Lake City	1906	
Vermont	University of Vermont College of Medicine	Burlington	1822	
Virginia	Eastern Virginia Medical School	Norfolk	1973	
Virginia	University of Virginia School of Medicine	Charlottesville	1827	
Virginia	Virginia Commonwealth University School of Medicine	Richmond	1838	
Virginia	Virginia Tech Carilion School of Medicine	Roanoke	2010	
Washington	University of Washington School of Medicine	Seattle	1946	
West Virginia	West Virginia University School of Medicine	Morgantown — All students complete their first two years in Morgantown before clinical education in Morgantown, Charleston, or Martinsburg.	1902	
West Virginia	Joan C. Edwards School of Medicine at Marshall University	Huntington	1977	
Wisconsin	Medical College of Wisconsin	Milwaukee	1912	
Wisconsin	University of Wisconsin School of Medicine and Public Health	Madison	1907	
