= Starburst Lounge shooting =

1980 mass shooting in El Paso, Texas

1980 El Paso shooting
- El Paso (Texas) El Paso (the United States)
- Location: 31°45′33″N 106°29′19″W; 5030 Fairbanks Drive, El Paso, Texas, United States
- Date: February 3, 1980; ~1:45 a.m. (MDT)
- Attack type: Mass shooting, Mass murder
- Weapon: .22-caliber Marlin Model 60 semi-automatic rifle
- Deaths: 5
- Injuries: 3
- Perpetrator: Barry Chvarak
- Defender: Roger Miller
- Motive: Thrill

On February 3, 1980, a mass shooting occurred at the Starburst Lounge bar in El Paso, Texas. 21-year-old Barry Chvarak, armed with a .22-caliber Marlin Model 60 semi-automatic rifle, killed five and injured three others before being arrested. In July 1980, Chvarak pleaded guilty to the crime. He was then sentenced to five consecutive life sentences.

It was the deadliest mass shooting in El Paso County until the 2019 El Paso shooting.

== Shooting ==
At 1:45 a.m., Chvarak told his twin brother that he was going to shoot up the soon to be closed bar they were sitting in, went to his truck, and came back with a rifle. His brother did not take the threat seriously.

Opening fire, he walked around the interior of the bar once, and attempted to do a second sweep, squeezing the trigger of his weapon at least 14 times while doing so.

Roger Miller whacked Chvarak with a pole cue until it broke, causing him to drop his rifle. Another citizen scooped up the weapon and hid it in the office of the bar. Chvarak sat around until police came to arrest him, upon which he said, "Why I did that, I don't know," and "I guess I'm going to prison."

== Victims ==
=== Killed ===
- Randy Steele, 20
- Kathleen Austin, 32
- Marianne Laweka, 53
- Jana Carpenter, 29
- Fredrick Bergford, 28

=== Wounded ===
- Phil Sell, 19

== Aftermath ==
Chvarak pled guilty and was sentenced to life with parole on July 18, 1980. He was first up for parole on February 3rd, 2000, but was denied. He was denied numerous times after that, with the most recent denial being on March 10, 2025. He is currently incarcerated at the Preston E. Smith Unit.

The bar was later demolished and replaced by a car wash, which was later abandoned.

== See also ==
- 2019 El Paso shooting
- 1984 Dallas nightclub shooting
- List of massacres in the United States
- List of mass shootings in the United States
- List of shootings in Texas
