= Sam Houston State University College of Osteopathic Medicine =

School of Sam Houston State University

Coordinates: 30.2670°N 95.4590°W

- Type: Public medical school
- Established: 2019
- Parent institution: Sam Houston State University
- Dean: Thomas J. Mohr
- Academic staff: 37 full-time faculty
- Doctoral students: 187
- Location: Conroe, Texas, United States
- Website: www.shsu.edu/academics/osteopathic-medicine/

Sam Houston State University College of Osteopathic Medicine (SHSU-COM) is the medical school of Sam Houston State University in Conroe, Texas. Founded in 2019, the college confers the Doctor of Osteopathic Medicine (D.O.) degree. The campus consists of a five-story, 107,000 square-foot building on 7.3 acres. In 2024, SHSU-COM received full Accreditation with Exceptional Outcomes from the American Osteopathic Association's (AOA) Commission on Osteopathic College Accreditation (COCA). The college employs 20 full-time clinical faculty, 17 full-time biomedical science faculty, and 37 staff members.

In its 2023-2024 Rankings, the medical school was unranked in research and primary care in the U.S. News & World Report of best medical schools.

== History ==
Upon its founding in 2019, the college represented the third osteopathic medical school in the state of Texas and the 8th college at Sam Houston State University. In August 2019, the college earned pre-accreditation status from the AOA's Commission on Osteopathic College Accreditation. Funding for the college included $85 million in privately raised capital and between $68 million and $93 million in federal funds. Construction began for the campus in 2018. In August 2020, the college hosted its first white coat ceremony with the inaugural class of 75 students. In November 2020, planning began for a $15 million parking structure. The same month, the medical school opened a medical clinic in Conroe, offering services in family medicine, internal medicine, pulmonology and sleep medicine, and osteopathic manipulative medicine.

== Academics ==
Prospective students apply through the Texas Medical & Dental Schools Application Service (TMDSAS). The college awards the Doctor of Osteopathic Medicine degree (DO). The program consists of four years of curriculum, with years 1 and 2 consisting of on-campus didactic lectures, small group assignments laboratory and clinical experience, while years 3 and 4 are completed at selected clinical sites.

== Campus ==
The campus consists of a five-story, 107,000 square-foot building on 7.3 acres, located in Conroe, Texas. The land for the campus was donated to the Sam Houston State University by Johnson Development Corp.
