= David Nakamura =

American journalist

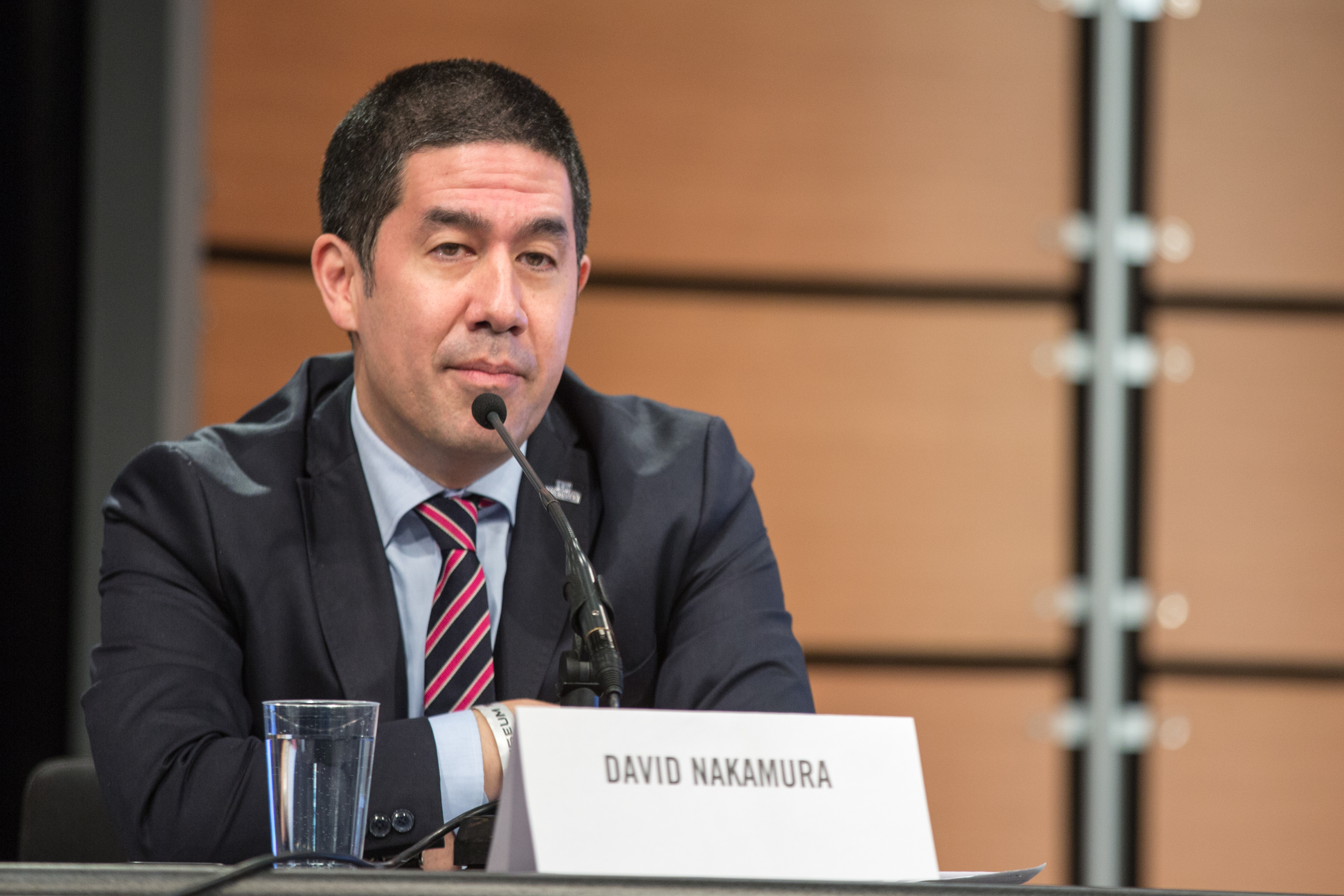
- Born: 1970 or 1971 (age 54–55)
- Education: B.A. University of Missouri
- Occupation: Journalist

David Akira Nakamura is an American journalist who works as the White House reporter for The Washington Post.

== Biography ==
Nakamura is of Japanese and Jewish descent and raised in northern Virginia. Being of Japanese descent, his father was interned during World War II and later served two tours during the Vietnam War. His parents were both high school teachers. He graduated with a B.A. in journalism from the University of Missouri. In 1992, he worked as a summer intern for The Washington Post before accepting a full-time position as a sports reporter. In 2001, he moved to Japan to teach English for a year. He returned to the US where he worked on the local news team focusing on education and city government in Washington, D.C., Virginia, and Maryland. In 2005, he won the Selden Ring Award for investigative reporting for a 2004 story on lead contamination in tap water in D.C. In 2016, he received an honorable mention by the Merriman Smith Memorial Award for excellence in presidential news coverage under deadline.

He is married to Kris Schenck.
