= Paul L. Foster School of Medicine =

Medical school in El Paso, Texas

Coordinates: 31.7718°N 106.4309°W

- Motto: From here, it's possible.
- Type: State University
- Established: November, 29th 2007
- Founders: Jose Manuel de la Rosa
- Affiliations: Texas Tech University Health Sciences Center El Paso
- Academic staff: 140+
- Location: El Paso, Texas, U.S.
- Campus: Urban
- Website: elpaso.ttuhsc.edu/som/

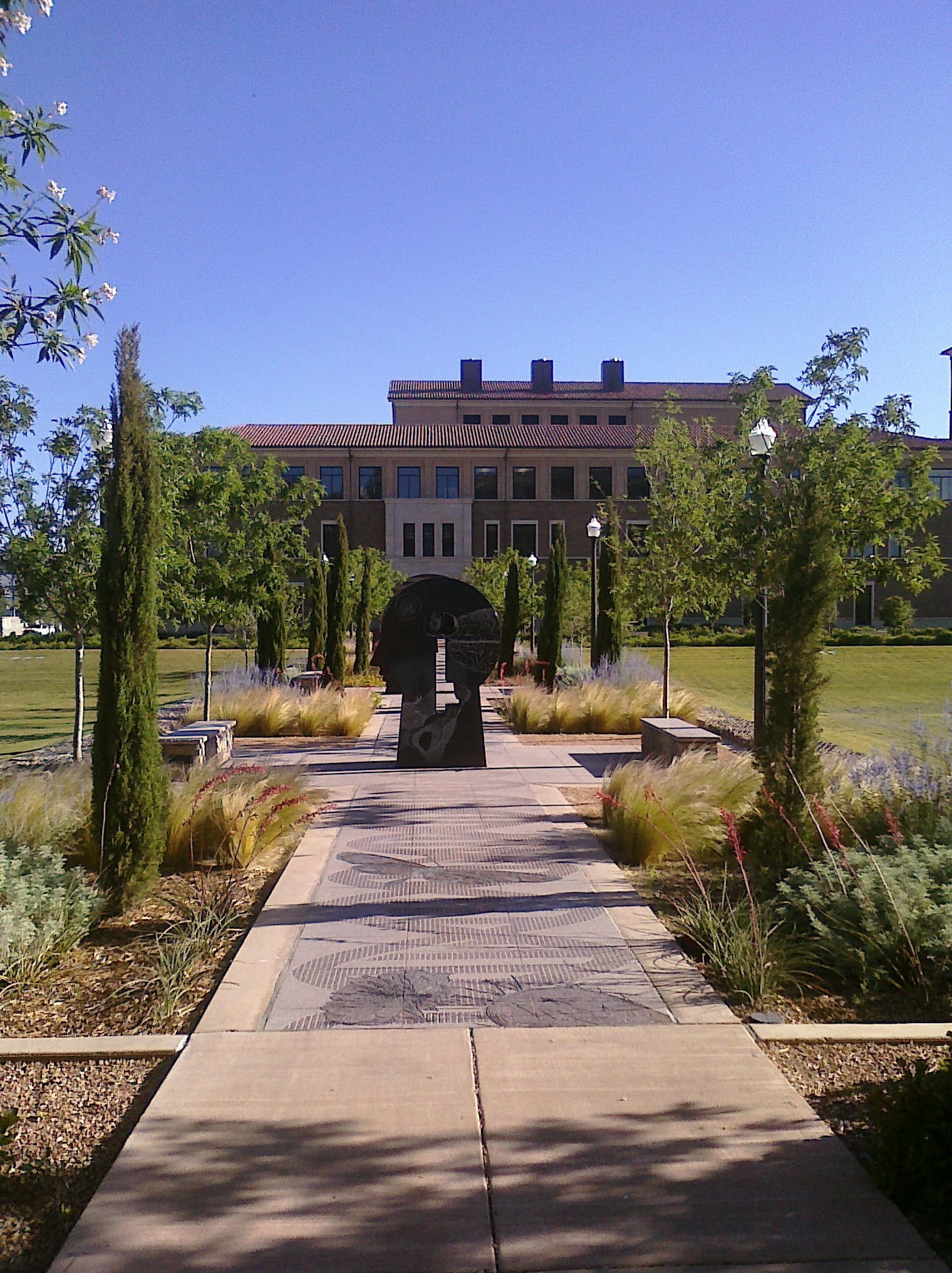
Medical Education Building.

The Paul L. Foster School of Medicine is a medical school of Texas Tech University Health Sciences Center El Paso located in El Paso, Texas. It is the 9th medical school in the state of Texas, and the medical school is the first one to open in almost four decades.

== History ==
The TTUHSC has had a regional campus at this location since 1973 and has been training a large number of 3rd and 4th year medical students since this time. The facility now has approximately 1,200 faculty and staff members. For its first 35 years, only third- and fourth-year medical students, along with residents, could train in the campus's eight accredited programs. However, in February 2008, the school received full accreditation, allowing it to accept first- and second-year medical students into its postgraduate medical training.

In 1998, TTUHSC El Paso celebrated 25 years serving the El Paso community. The following year, then-Texas Tech System Chancellor John T. Montford shared with the Board of Regents a vision for a full-fledged four-year medical school in El Paso to help alleviate a severe shortage of physicians in the area. Currently, there are less than 110 physicians for every 100,000 people in El Paso. The national average is 198 physicians per 100,000 patients. The Texas average is only 150 per 100,000. Studies have shown that most medical students remain in the region in which they received their education to establish their practices. The addition of the first two years of the medical school would allow students from El Paso and nearby regions to complete their education near home, in hopes of retaining doctors in the area.

In 2001, longtime community philanthropists J.O. and Marlene Stewart donated 10.2 acres of land near the HSC for the new medical campus. The Paso del Norte Foundation approved a $1.25 million scholarship grant program for local students contingent on the approval of the four-year medical school.

During the 2001 Texas Legislative Session (77th), the El Paso legislative delegation secured $40 million in tuition revenue bonds for the research facility, one of three buildings on the new campus, just a short walk from the Texas Tech University Health Sciences Center—as well as an $11 million clinic expansion project that took about two years, and added a third floor on the present TTUHSC El Paso Medical Center building.

In 2002, the Paso del Norte Health Foundation announced a $1.25 million scholarship/grant loan program for TTUHSC El Paso students choosing to practice in El Paso.

In 2003, Texas Governor Rick Perry visited the El Paso campus for a ceremonial signing of House Bill 28, article 10, which authorized Texas Tech to issue $45 million in tuition revenue bonds for the construction of a classroom/office building for a four-year medical school at the El Paso campus. The governor also announced an additional $2 million in funding to finance start-up costs and faculty salaries.

On December 9, 2003, the ground breaking for El Paso Medical Science Building I took place, and two years later in January 2006, a ribbon cutting followed. The 93,000 square-foot facility houses research on diabetes, cancer, environmental health and infectious diseases, as well as a repository dedicated to data on Hispanic health and a genomic facility to link hereditary diseases in families.

In November 2007 The Paul L. Foster School of Medicine celebrated a ribbon cutting for the second of the three buildings that will compose the medical school. This building was the Medical Education Building (MEB) of the Paul L. Foster School of Medicine at Texas Tech University Health Sciences Center. According to their website, the MEB is a four-story building with "125,000 sq. ft., and includes a student services area, cafeteria, food prep area, classrooms, a library, evaluation areas, small group rooms, clinical skills areas, a simulation room, basic science labs and a gross anatomy lab. The first four-year medical school class is anticipated to be seated in August 2009."

== Curriculum ==
The Paul L. Foster School of Medicine curriculum is designed in a way where the medical students at the school will take four classes at the same time during their first two clinical science years. These core classes are scientific principles of medicine; society, community and individual; medical skills; and a masters' colloquium.

As compared to other medical education programs that stress months of studying microbiology and human anatomy, the curriculum is designed so that students will learn about symptoms such as ear infection, chest pain, shortness of breath, and stomach pain. They will need to identify the cause and the details of each cause and symptom. Through this process the relevant anatomy, microbiology, biochemistry, as well as the other traditional subjects will be integrated into the cases presentations of the 120 clinical scenarios.

== Departments ==
- Anesthesiology
- Emergency Medicine
- Family Medicine and Community Health
- Internal Medicine
- Neurology
- Obstetrics/Gynecology
- Ophthalmology
- Orthopaedic Surgery and Rehabilitation
- Pathology
- Pediatrics
- Psychiatry
- Radiology
- Surgery
- Garbar Breast Care Center

== Affiliated institutions ==
- Graduate School of Biomedical Sciences at Texas Tech University Health Sciences Center El Paso
- Gayle Greve Hunt School of Nursing
- University Medical Center (El Paso, Texas) formerly Thomason Hospital
- William Beaumont Army Medical Center
- El Paso Psychiatric Center
- VA Clinics

== Rankings ==
In its 2023-2024 Rankings, the medical school was unranked in research and primary care in the U.S. News & World Report of best medical schools. However, the school ranked #41 amongst medical schools for producing the most graduates practicing in rural areas and #60 amongst medical schools for producing most graduates practicing in primary care.

El Paso was ranked in the top 10 best cities for medical schools by premedlife magazine.

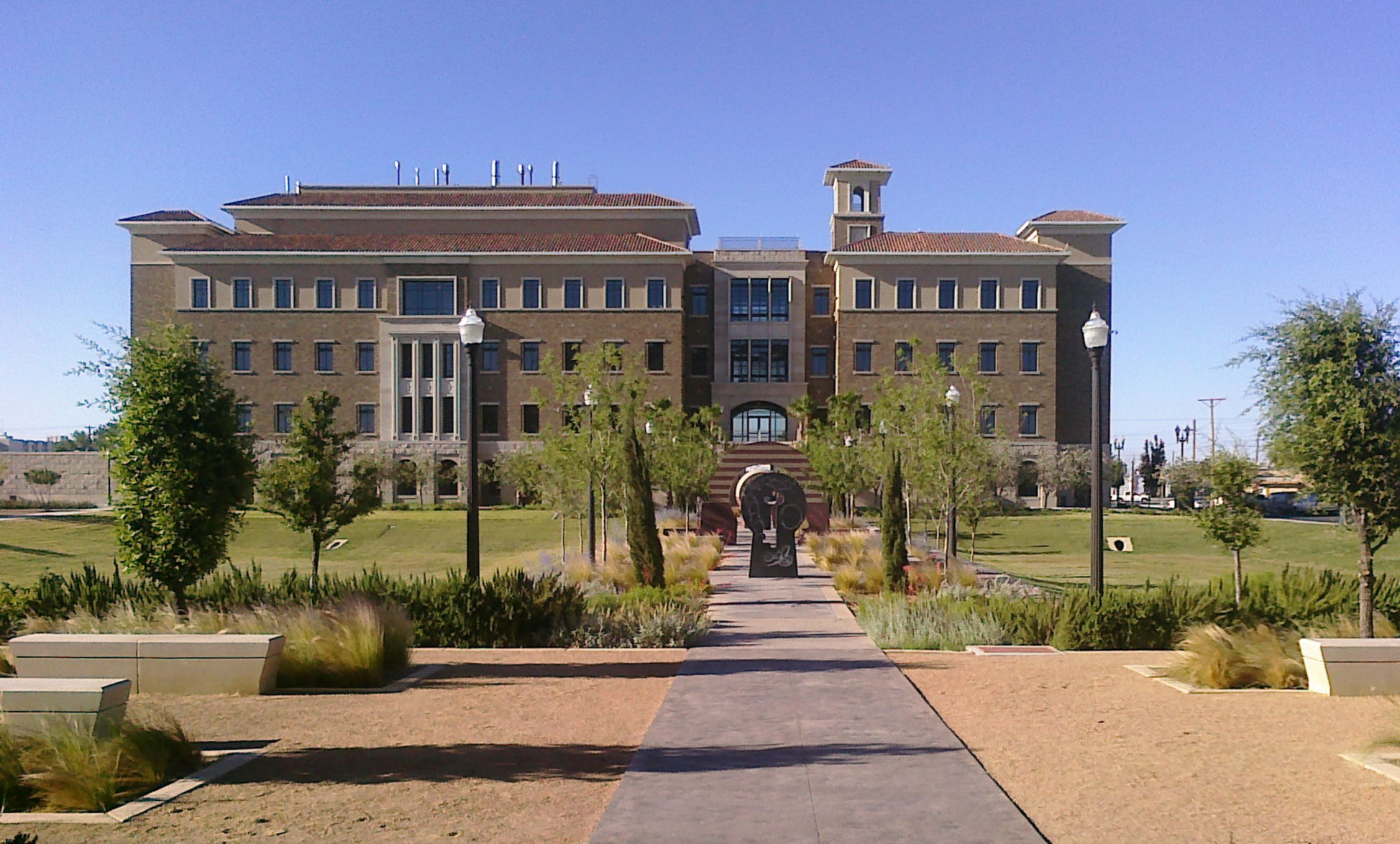
Medical Sciences Building.

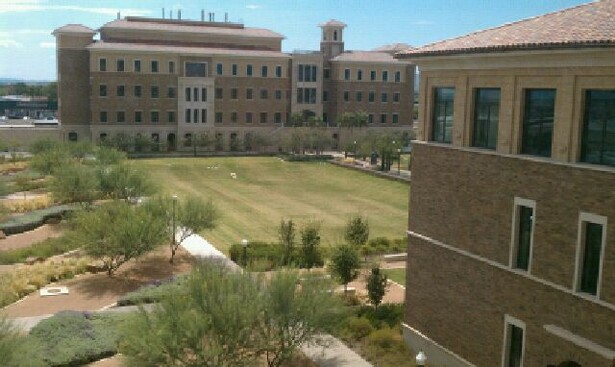
Tedd Mitchell Field at Paul L. Foster School of Medicine.

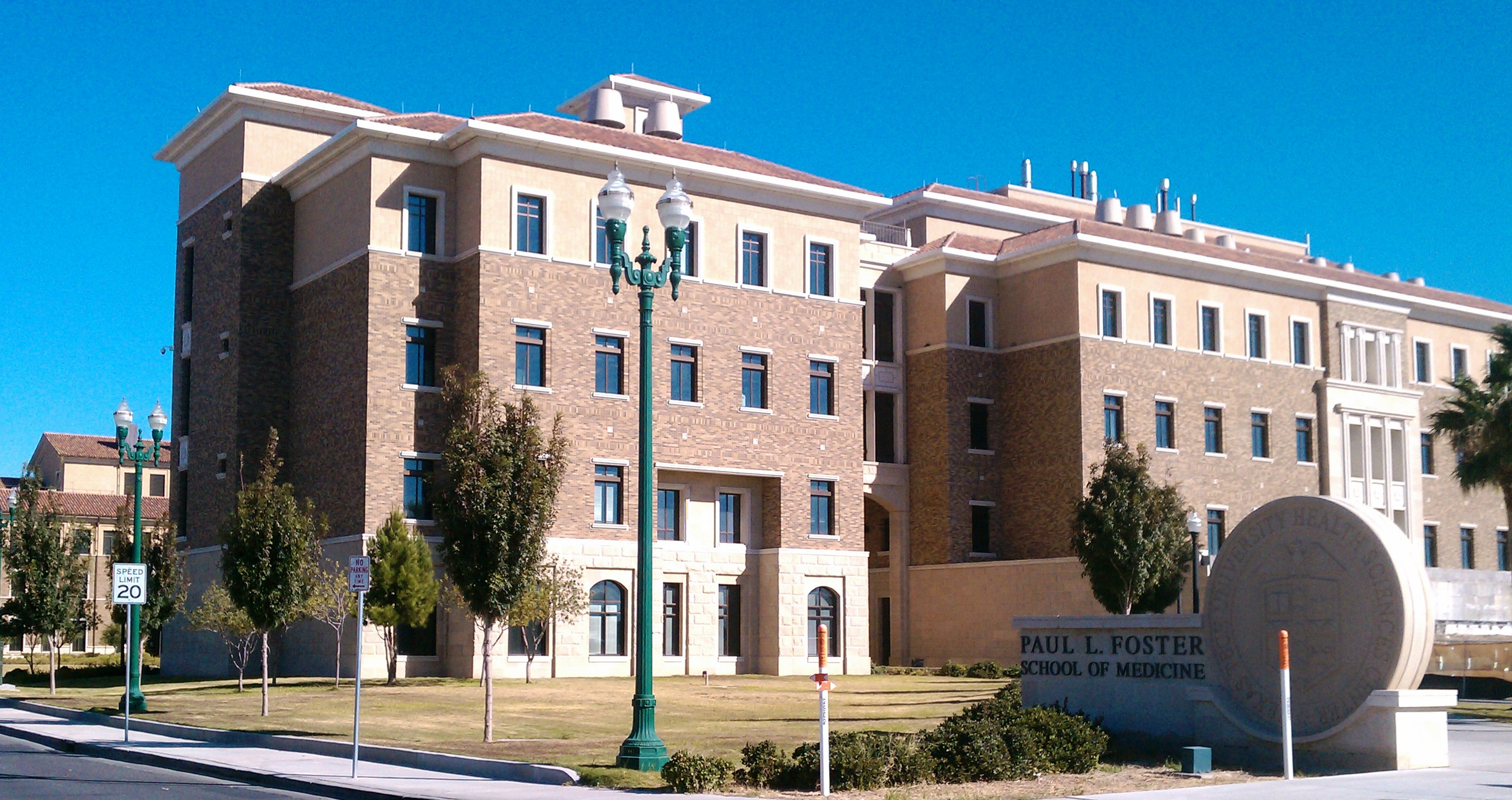
Medical Sciences Building I.

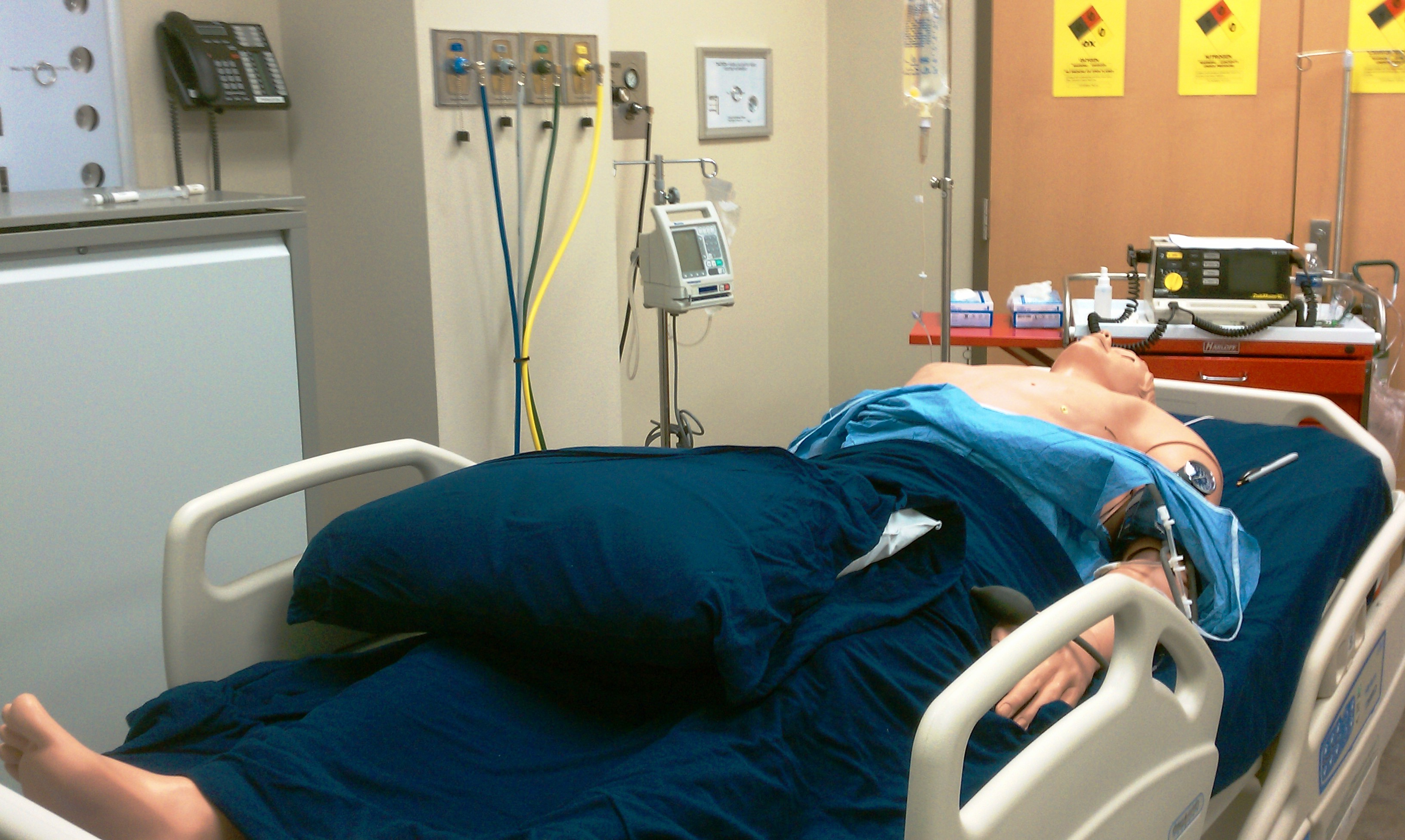
Patient simulator in the Clinical Skills and Clinical Simulation Center.
