= Paso del Norte Health Foundation =

US-based non-profit organization

- Formation: 1995
- Type: Private foundation
- Headquarters: El Paso, Texas, United States
- Revenue: $17,628,455 (2015)
- Expenses: $11,761,539 (2015)
- Website: pdnhf.org

The Paso del Norte Health Foundation is one of the largest private foundations on the U.S.–Mexico border. It was established in 1995 from the sale of Providence Memorial Hospital to Tenet Healthcare Corporation. The Foundation is committed to improving the health and promoting the wellness of the people living in west Texas, southern New Mexico, and Ciudad Juárez, Mexico, through education and prevention.

Between 1997 and the end of 2008, the Foundation committed nearly $90 million to the Paso del Norte region with more than 260 agencies receiving grants ranging from several thousand dollars to more than one million dollars.
