= El Paso Children's Hospital =

Hospital in El Paso, Texas, United States

Coordinates: 31.77177°N 106.43397°W

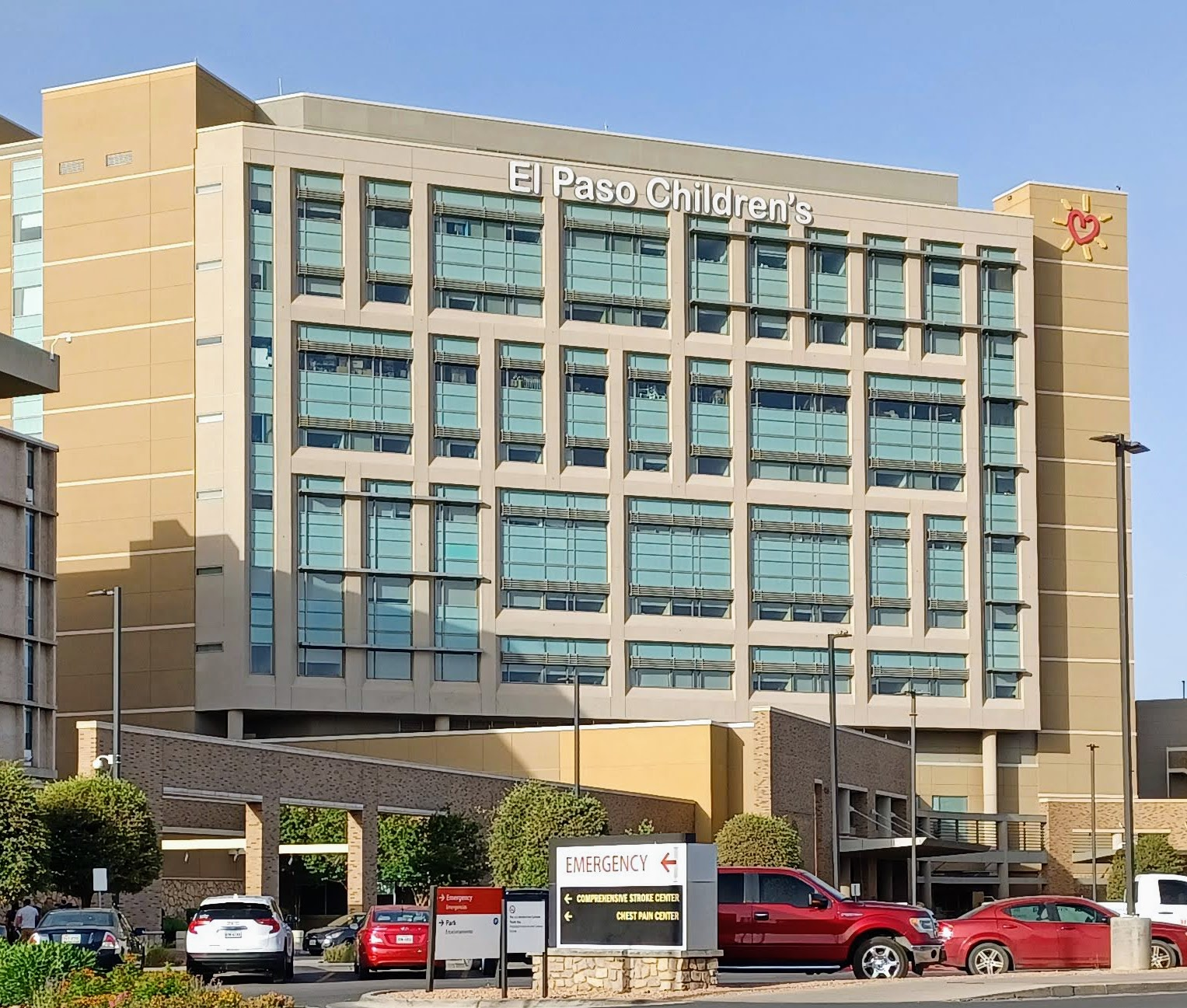
El Paso Children's Hospital

El Paso Children's Hospital is a medical center in El Paso, Texas, that specializes in the treatment of children.

In 2015, the hospital filed for Chapter 11 bankruptcy protection.
