= Peter R. Neumann =

German journalist and academic (born 1974)

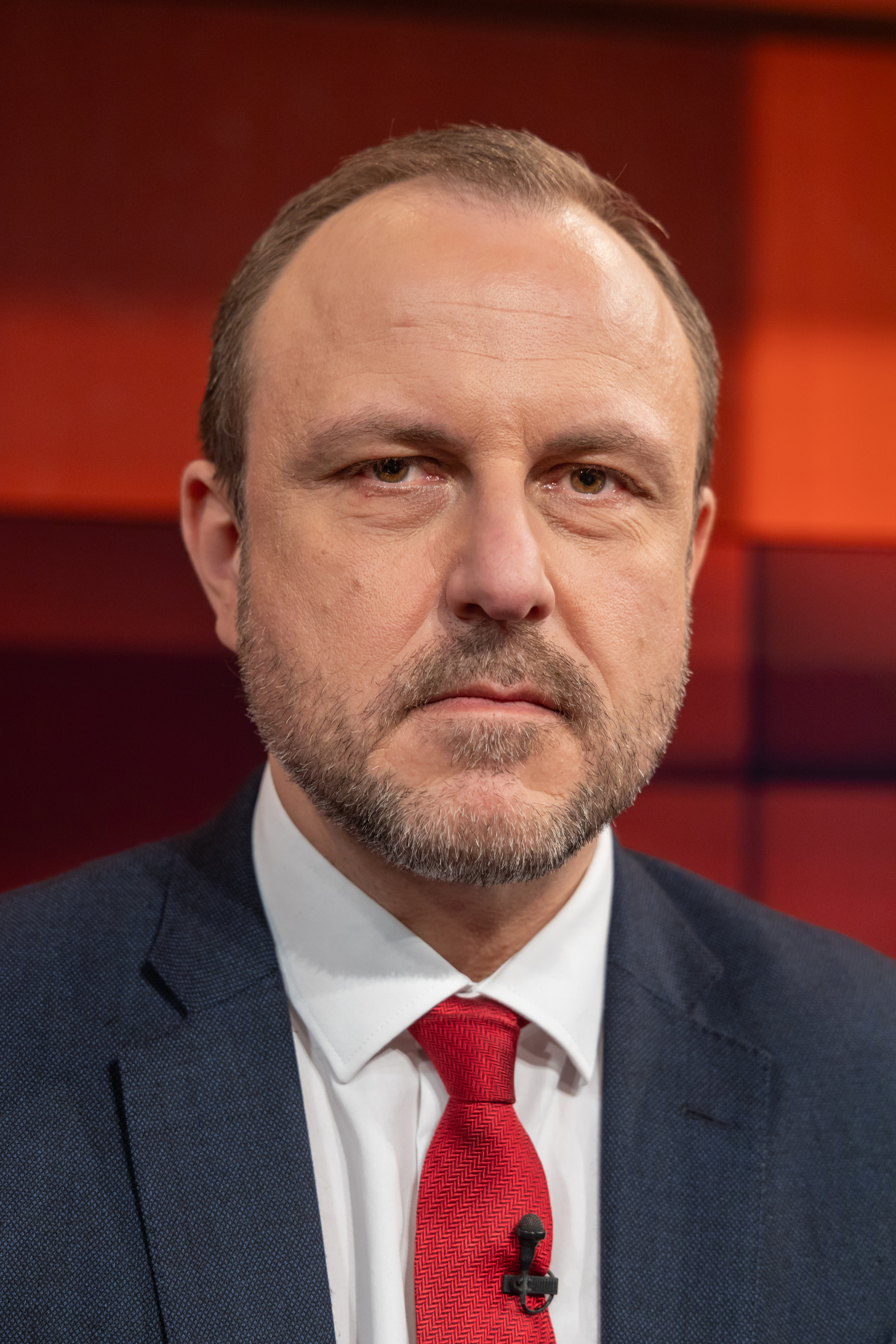
- Neumann in 2023
- Born: 4 December 1974 (age 51)
- Occupations: Journalist, academic
- Organization: International Centre for the Study of Radicalisation and Political Violence

Peter Rudolf Neumann (born 4 December 1974) is a German journalist and academic who frequently appears on radio and television as an expert on terrorism and political violence. He is the Founding Director of the International Centre for the Study of Radicalisation and Political Violence as well as Professor of Security Studies at the War Studies Department of King's College London.

== Career ==
Neumann worked in Germany as a radio journalist. According to his biography he 'went to university in Berlin, Belfast and London. He received an MA in Political Science from the Free University of Berlin and a PhD in War Studies from King's College London.'

Neumann was director at the Centre for Defence Studies at King's College London from 2005-2007 and was then Director of The International Centre for the Study of Radicalisation and Political Violence (ICSR); a terrorism research institute based at King's College London.

=== Political activities ===
Ahead of the North Rhine-Westphalia state elections in 2017, Neumann served as adviser to Christian Democratic Union of Germany (CDU) candidate Armin Laschet.

In October 2019, Neumann was present for a speech Michael Gove made at the German embassy in London on German Unity Day, and summarised part of the speech on social media. The content of the summary was disputed by Gove, who requested that he "reflect the whole speech in context". Neumann described a negative reaction to parts of the speech from the audience, who he said "clearly felt that a comparison was made" between the reunification of Germany and Brexit.

Ahead of the 2021 elections, CDU chairman Armin Laschet included Neumann in his eight-member shadow cabinet for the Christian Democrats’ campaign.

== Other activities ==
- Federal Criminal Police Office (BKA), Member of the European Expert Network on Terrorism Issues
- International Centre for the Study of Radicalisation and Political Violence (ICSR)
- Center on Global Counterterrorism Cooperation, a project of the Fourth Freedom Forum, Advisor

== Bibliography ==
=== Books ===
==== Authored ====
- Neumann, Peter R. (1999). IRA: Langer Weg zum Frieden (in German). Europäische Verlagsanstalt. ISBN 978-3434530435.
- Neumann, Peter R. (2000). Al Gore: Eine Biographie (in German). Deutsche Verlagsanstalt. ISBN 978-3421054319.
- Neumann, Peter R. (2003). Britain's long war: British strategy in the Northern Ireland conflict 1969-98. London: Palgrave Macmillan. ISBN 978-1403917799.
- Smith, Michael L. R.; Neumann, Peter R. (2008). The strategy of terrorism: how it works and why it fails. London: Routledge. ISBN 978-0415426183.
- Neumann, Peter R. (2009). Joining Al-Qaeda: Jihadist recruitment in Europe. London: Routledge. ISBN 978-0415547314.
- Neumann, Peter R. (2009). Old and New Terrorism. London: Polity. ISBN 978-0745643755.
- Neumann, Peter R. (2016). Radicalized: New Jihadists and the Threat to the West. London: I.B. Tauris. ISBN 978-1784536732.
- Neumann, Peter R. (2016). Der Terror ist unter uns: Dschihadismus, Radikalisierung und Terrorismus in Europa (in German). Berlin: Ullstein. ISBN 978-3550081538.
- Neumann, Peter R. (2020). Bluster: Donald Trump's War on Terror. New York: Hurst and OUP. ISBN 978-0190099947.
- Neumann, Peter R. (2023). Logik der Angst: Die rechtsextreme Gefahr und ihre Wurzeln (in German) (2nd ed.). Rowohlt. ISBN 978-3737101837.
- Neumann, Peter R. (2023). The New World Disorder: how the West is destroying itself. Translated by David Shaw. Scribe. ISBN 978-1915590145.
- Neumann, Peter R. (2024). Die Rückkehr des Terrors: Wie uns der Dschihadismus herausfordert (in German) (2nd ed.). Rowohlt. ISBN 978-3737102223.
- Neumann, Peter R.; Schneider, Richard C. (2025). Das Sterben der Demokratie: Der Plan der Rechtspopulisten – in Europa und den USA (in German). Rowohlt. ISBN 978-3737102360.

==== Edited ====
- Neumann, Peter R., ed. (2015). Radicalization. Critical Concepts in Military, Strategic, and Security Studies. London: Routledge. ISBN 978-1138791268.

=== Research reports ===
- Heißner, Stefan; Peter R. Neumann; John Holland-McCowan; Rajan Basra (2017). Caliphate in decline: an estimate of Islamic State's financial fortunes (PDF). London: International Centre for the Study of Radicalisation, King's College London.

=== Articles ===
- Neumann, Peter R. (Summer 2006). "Europe's jihadist dilemma". Survival. 48 (2): 71–84.

=== Critical studies and reviews of Neumann's work ===
The strategy of terrorism

- Harley, Jason (Autumn 2010). "[Untitled review]". Australian Army Journal. 7 (1): 181–186. Archived from the original on 2024-06-14.
