= Liberty University =

Christian university in Lynchburg, Virginia, U.S.

- Former names: Lynchburg Baptist College (1971–1976); Liberty Baptist College (1976–1984)
- Motto: "Knowledge Aflame"
- Type: Private university
- Established: 1971; 55 years ago
- Founders: Jerry Falwell Sr. Elmer L. Towns
- Accreditation: SACS
- Religious affiliation: Southern Baptist Conservatives of Virginia
- Academic affiliations: NAICU
- Endowment: $3.5 billion (2026)
- Chancellor: Jonathan Falwell
- President: Dondi E. Costin
- Provost: Deanna Keith (interim)
- Academic staff: 850 full-time, 4,155 part-time (fall 2024)
- Students: 104,327 (fall 2024)
- Undergraduates: 52,961 (fall 2024)
- Postgraduates: 51,366 (fall 2024)
- Location: Lynchburg, Virginia, United States; 37.352°N 79.180°W
- Campus: 7,000 acres (28 km^{2}); Small city
- Newspaper: The Liberty Champion
- Colors: Navy blue, white, red, and light blue
- Nickname: Liberty Flames and Lady Flames
- Sporting affiliations: NCAA Division I FBS – CUSA; Big East
- Mascot: Sparky the Eagle
- Website: liberty.edu

Liberty University (LU or simply Liberty) is a conservative, private evangelical Christian university in Lynchburg, Virginia, United States. Founded in 1971 by Jerry Falwell Sr. and Elmer L. Towns as Lynchburg Baptist College, Liberty is among the world's largest Christian universities and one of the largest private non-profit universities in the United States by total student enrollment.

Liberty University consists of 17 colleges, including the Helms School of Government and the Rawlings School of Divinity. Most of its enrollment is in online courses; in 2020, the university enrolled about 15,000 in its residential program and 80,000 online. Liberty's tuition fees are among the lowest in the United States. Liberty's athletic teams compete in Division I of the NCAA and are collectively known as the Liberty Flames. Their athletics program joined Conference USA as a full member in 2023.

The university requires undergraduate students to take evangelical biblical studies classes. Its honor code, called the "Liberty Way", prohibits premarital sex, cohabitation, any kind of romantic relationship between members of the same sex, and alcohol use. Liberty University is perceived as a "bastion of the Christian right", playing a prominent role in Republican politics under Falwell and his son and successor Jerry Falwell Jr.; Falwell Jr. left in 2020 amid allegations of sexual and professional impropriety and was later sued by the university.

The university has faced multiple controversies, including allegations of mismanagement of sexual assault cases, racial and LGBTQ discrimination, censorship, and regulatory violations, the last of which culminated in a $14 million Clery Act fine in 2024 for systemic underreporting of campus crimes.

== History ==
=== Establishment and early years (1971-2007) ===
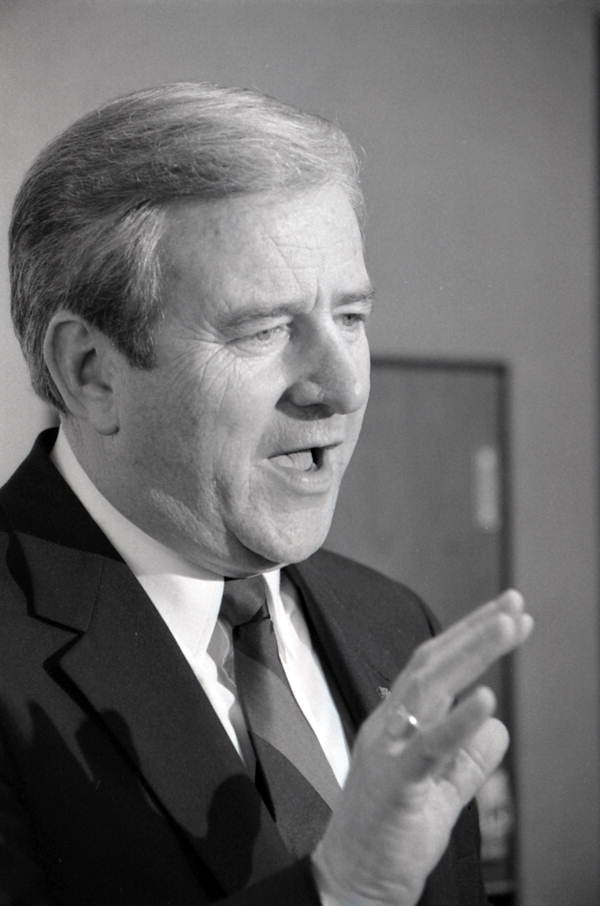
Jerry Falwell, evangelist and leader of the Moral Majority

The school was founded as Lynchburg Baptist College in 1971 by televangelist Jerry Falwell Sr. and Elmer L. Towns. Falwell, already a pastor of Thomas Road Baptist Church, served as the first chancellor of the school. From 1979 to the late 1980s, Falwell Sr. also headed the Moral Majority, a right-wing political organization. In the first years of the university, students stayed in a variety of locations, including a hotel in downtown Lynchburg, a previously abandoned hospital, and an entire floor of a Ramada Inn. It wasn't until 1981 that all students lived on campus.

In 1974, Lynchburg Baptist was given a 501(c)(3) tax-exempt status by the IRS. The school changed its name to Liberty Baptist College in 1976. Officials said the change aimed to distance the school from the name Lynchburg, which is often mistakenly associated with lynching (Note: The city was actually named for the city founder, John Lynch, a merchant and ferryman who was also an early slavery abolitionist; the act of lynching is likely named after his brother, Charles Lynch, who committed extrajudicial punishment, later called "Lynch's law", against suspected loyalists during the American Revolutionary War.); co-founder Towns also said that Falwell Sr. wanted to use the name "Liberty" to ride the enthusiasm for the Bicentennial of the United States.

The name changed again in 1984, to Liberty University. In 1985, the university launched a distance-learning program by mailing VHS tapes to students; this was the forerunner to Liberty University's current online program. From 1987 to 1991, Liberty underwent an IRS probe that resulted in no change to Liberty's status. The probe began in the aftermath of the PTL Scandal, and was a part of wide spread investigations by the IRS into the activities of Falwell, Pat Robertson, and Oral Roberts.

In its early decades, the university was kept afloat financially by major donors; it was placed on probation multiple times in the 1990s by the Southern Association of Colleges and Schools due to heavy debt loads. In 1990, the university's debt totaled $110 million; but by 1996, this had decreased to $40 million. In 1994, Sun Myung Moon's Women's Federation for World Peace funneled $3.5 million to Liberty University, and in 1996, Moon's News World Communications loaned a further $400,000 to Liberty. Liberty was able to finally pay off all of their debt in 2007 after Falwell Sr. died, as a result of $29 million in proceeds paid out from a life insurance policy taken out on Falwell Sr.

In 2006, Barron's Profiles of American Colleges ranked undergraduate admission to LU as "competitive", its fourth-highest of six ranks. When high-speed Internet connections became more widespread around 2005, Liberty began to offer exclusively online courses to a larger adult population.

=== Modern history (2007-Present) ===
After Falwell Sr. died in 2007, his son Jerry Falwell Jr. became the university's second chancellor and fourth president.

In May 2009, Liberty University withdrew official recognition of the student Young Democrats club, saying that the club's political positions, including support of abortion rights, conflicted with the school's. Liberty's College Republicans club remained officially recognized, and continued to receive University funding. After criticism however, Liberty announced new policy that would treat all political clubs as unofficial, allowing students to meet on campus, but not providing any funds to such clubs. The new policy also stated that Liberty reserved the right to refuse a club's ability to meet on campus if a club endorsed "candidates whose views are contrary to the university’s Christian mission."

In 2011, Liberty blocked campus internet access to the website of a local newspaper, the News & Advance, after it reported that the university received more federal financial aid than any other school in Virginia. Falwell Jr. refused to say why the block was imposed, said it was unrelated to anything published in the newspaper, and said that the News & Advance had been blocked on campus before. The block was lifted one day after the financial-aid article was published.

In spring 2020, during the COVID-19 pandemic, Liberty allowed some students to return to campus after spring break over the objections of the city's mayor and contrary to the practices of most U.S. colleges and universities. When a ProPublica reporter and The New York Times photographer investigated why the university remained partially open, the university pushed the local district attorney to charge them with trespassing.

A few months later, then-president Falwell Jr. posted a picture of Virginia's then-governor Ralph Northam's black face in a tweet that many found racist. Some staff resigned in protest; some black students pursued transfers, many contending that the tweet was a symptom of a larger problem at the university. In response to internal and external criticism, Liberty University officials hired Kelvin Edwards, an alumnus and former NFL player, to lead diversity initiatives on campus, then fired him three months later. Edwards sued the university, alleging a breach of contract but the lawsuit was dismissed.

In November 2020, Liberty University graduate and athletics booster Bob Good won a seat in the US House of Representatives, making him the first Liberty graduate to be elected to the House.

In fall 2021, an outbreak of COVID-19 forced all classes on the Lynchburg campus to go online-only for two weeks. More than 400 students and 50 staff members tested positive for the virus. The campus did not require COVID-19 vaccinations, masks, or social distancing. A football game continued as scheduled with no restrictions in place, while a convocation originally scheduled to be held inside the Vines Center was instead held outdoors in Williams Stadium.

On March 31, 2023, Dondi Costin was named president of Liberty University.

Liberty University was a member of the advisory board of Project 2025, a collection of conservative and right-wing policy proposals from the Heritage Foundation to reshape the United States federal government and consolidate executive power in advance of Donald Trump winning the 2024 presidential election.

In July 2024, Liberty was sued for $300,000 by Ellenor Zinski, whose lawsuit alleges that the university violated Title VII of the Civil Rights Act of 1964 when it fired Zinski, who is transgender, since the university explicitly cited Zinski's gender as the reason for her firing. Liberty University contends that Zinski's contract was violated by knowingly breaking LU's policies that are based in their religious beliefs and thus protected by the Constitution. Liberty University's doctrinal statement lists "denial of birth sex by self-identification with a different gender" is an example of "sinful acts prohibited by God."

=== Presidents ===
No.	Name	Term
1	A. Pierre Guillermin (Note: Liberty first named a president in 1975.)	1975–1997
2	John M. Borek Jr.	1997–2004
3	Jerry Falwell (Note: Falwell was already chancellor of Liberty University when he retained the title president also after Borek's departure.)	2004–2007
–	David L. Young (Note: While Falwell inherited the title of president, Young, the executive vice president and chief operating officer, served as de facto president of the university.)	2004–2007
4	Jerry Falwell Jr.	2007–2020
5	Jerry Prevo (Note: Prevo was initially interim president before serving in the full position.)	2020–2023
6	Dondi E. Costin	2023–present

== Campus ==
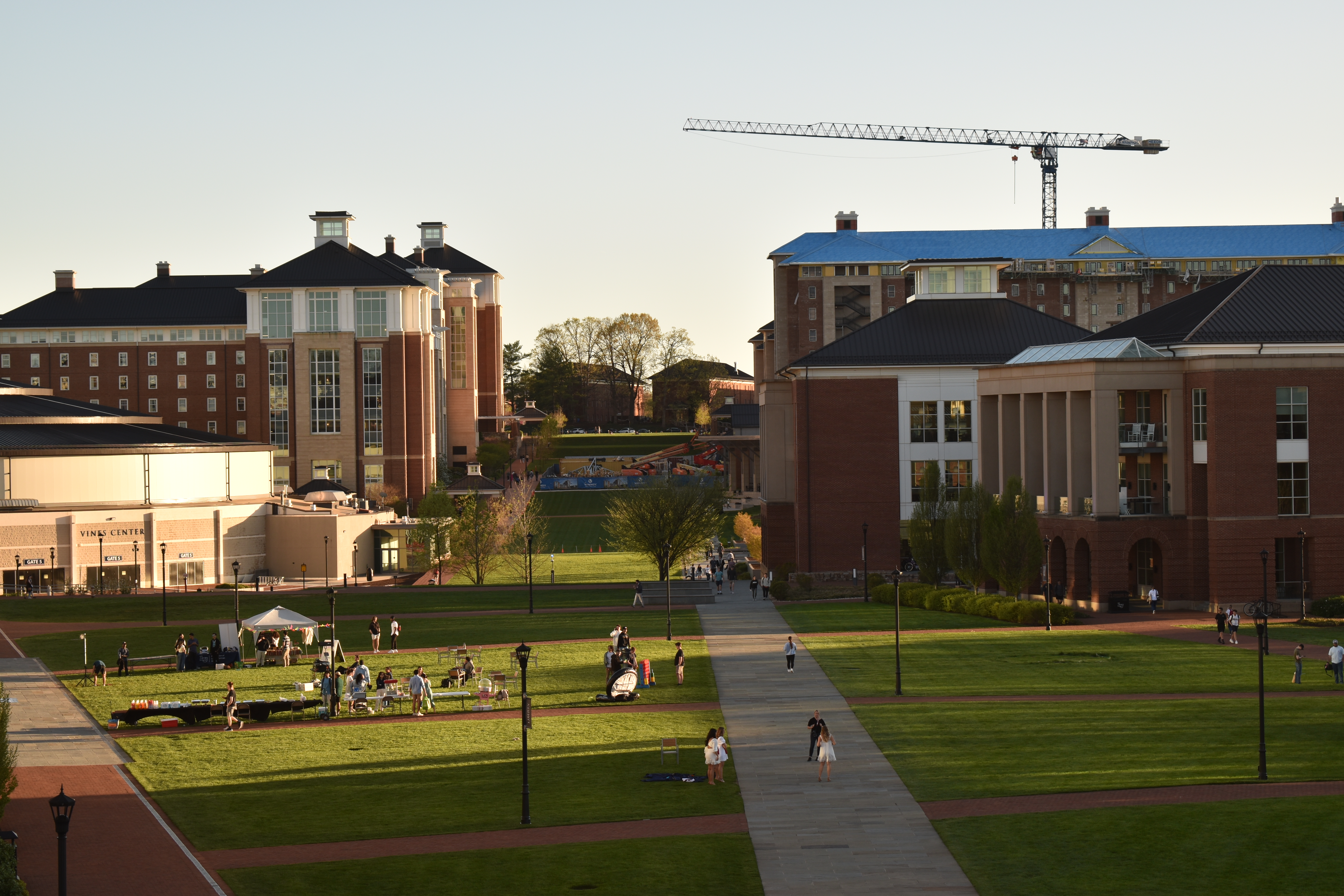
University Commons, pictured in 2024

The 17-story, 245-foot Freedom Tower, completed in February 2018, is the tallest building in Lynchburg. The tower holds a 25-bell carillon that includes a replica of the Liberty Bell, the latter of which was originally created as a part of a fundraising campaign for Liberty in 1976.

The Hancock Welcome Center celebrated its ribbon cutting ceremony on December 7, 2012. It is a three-level, 33,000-square-foot Jeffersonian-style building featuring an atrium, boardroom, theater, lounges, a banquet hall, several smaller counseling rooms, and a patio with a view of the Blue Ridge Mountains. The Champion Center, a 68,000-square-foot extension to the Welcome Center, is a memorial to Falwell Sr.'s vision for Liberty, and is set to open sometime during the 2026-27 school year.

Liberty University's Center for Music & Worship has hosted the Miss Virginia beauty competition, which sends the winner of the state to represent it in the Miss America Pageant.

Construction was completed in August 2009 on the Liberty Mountain Snowflex Centre, a synthetic ski slope. The centre was designed by England's Briton Engineering. The first of its kind in the United States, it includes beginner, intermediate, and advanced slopes.

The Observatory Center opened in spring 2013 next to the Equestrian Center. The dome has a classroom that can fit up to 20 people. It houses a 20-inch (510 mm) RC Optical Systems Truss Ritchey-Chrétien and several Celestron CPC 800 8-inch Schmidt-Cassegrain telescopes on pedestals, able to roll out under a roof. The observatory serves three purposes: instruction, public nights and research. Student Activities controls the use of the observatory and is open to all students.

In 2018, Liberty University opened a $3.2 million on-campus shooting range to train students to protect themselves against shooters and terrorists.

=== Libraries and museums ===
==== Jerry Falwell Library ====
The four-story, 170,000-square-foot Jerry Falwell Library opened in January 2014 with more than 250,000 items and room for another 170,000. They are accessible via a robot-assisted storage and retrieval system, which locates requested items within a large storage room and delivers them to the front desk. There are 150 public computers throughout the building for electronic archive research. The library has group study rooms, writable walls, balconies, terraces, and a vegetative roof. At its entrance stands a 24-foot media wall, powered by three Microsoft Kinect units and integrated using a custom program that allows visitors to scroll through university news, browse pictures contributed from students, and learn about upcoming university events.

The $50 million library is part of a larger $500 million building and expansion plan announced by Liberty University.

==== National Civil War Chaplains Museum ====
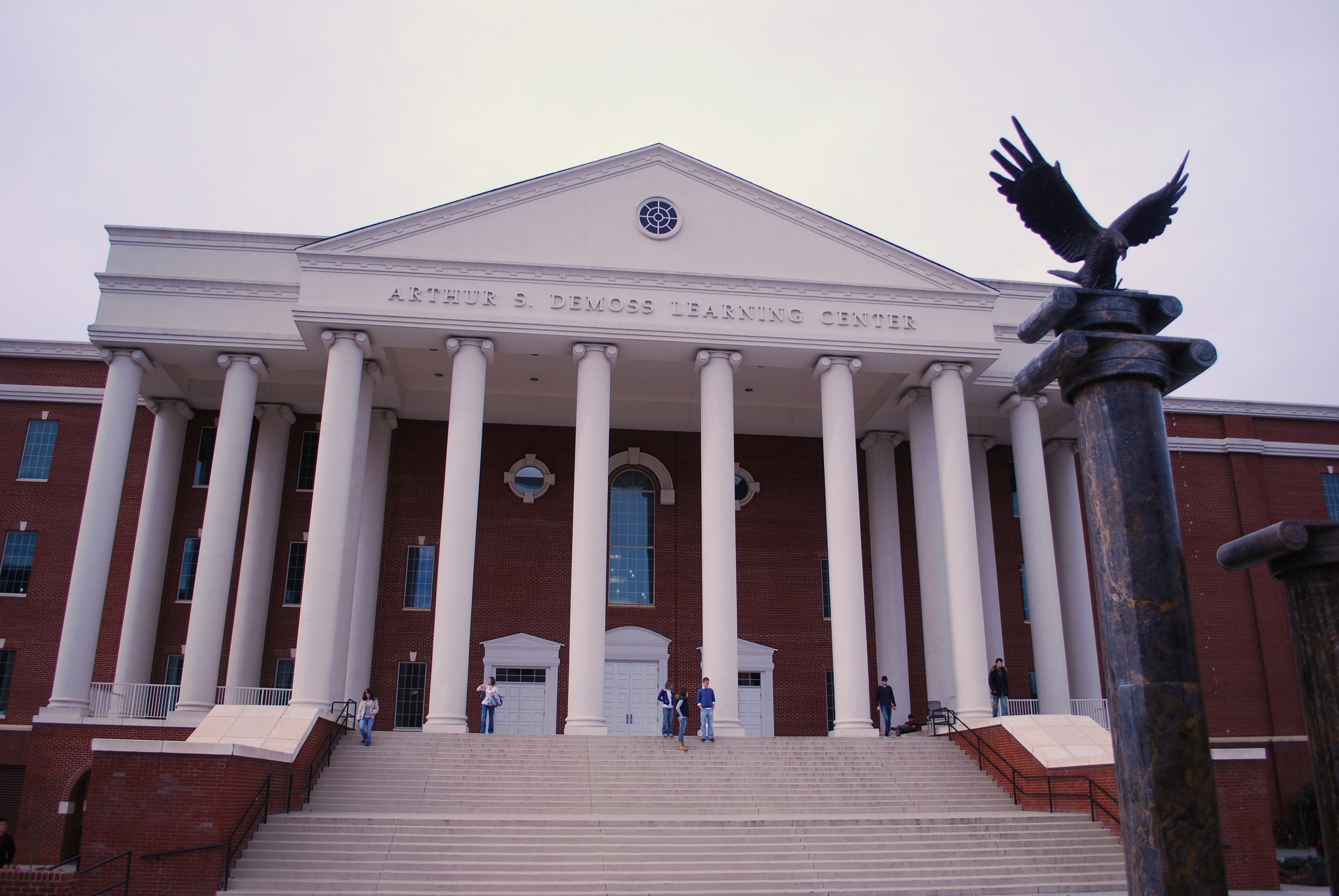
DeMoss Learning Center at Liberty University

The National Civil War Chaplains Museum contains exhibits about clergy members and religious activity during the Civil War era. It is the only museum in the nation devoted to this purpose. The mission of the museum is to "educate the public about the role of chaplains, priests, and rabbis and religious organizations in the Civil War; to promote the continuing study of the many methods of dissemination of religious doctrine and moral teachings during the War; to preserve religious artifacts, and to present interpretive programs that show the influence of religion on the lives of political and military personnel." A 501(c)(3) organization, the museum exists within the Jerry Falwell Library.

The museum commemorates Catholic, Protestant, and Jewish chaplains (including African-American chaplains), and houses publications and artifacts from both the Union and Confederate militaries. There are several areas in the museum that are given special attention including:

- The role of the United States Christian Commission, which is the forerunner to today's USO and Red Cross.
- "The relationship of religion to political and military leaders, common soldiers, and the public in the North and South."

==== Carter Glass Mansion ====
The Carter Glass Mansion, also called Montview, is a house built in 1923 for Carter Glass, a newspaper publisher, lifelong advocate of segregation, U.S. senator, U.S. treasury secretary under President Woodrow Wilson, and Chairman of the Senate Appropriations Committee and President Pro Tempore of the Senate during the presidency of Franklin D. Roosevelt. The 1 1/2-story house, which is flanked by slightly smaller ells, has 18-inch (46 cm) walls of quartz fieldstone quarried from the property and a grey gambrel roof. It is listed on the National Register of Historic Places and Virginia Landmarks Register.

The 1.7-acre (0.69 ha) estate was purchased by Liberty University in the late 1970s to be the headquarters of the university administration. It housed the main office of university founder Jerry Falwell, who died at his desk on May 15, 2007. Falwell and his wife were buried on the rear lawn of the mansion and a memorial to Falwell was placed there, overlooking the rest of the campus. The estate is now largely a tourist site, with Falwell's office preserved in its 2007 condition and the upstairs section of the mansion converted to a bed and breakfast for Liberty University guests.

=== Athletic venues ===
==== Williams Stadium ====
Williams Stadium is the home field for the Liberty Flames football team. Opened in 1989, the stadium seats 25,000 spectators. An indoor practice facility was opened in 2017 at a cost of $29 million.

==== Liberty Arena ====
The Liberty Arena is the home of the men's and women's basketball teams and women's volleyball. The $65 million, 125,000-square-foot space, which opened in 2020, seats 4,000 spectators.

==== Liberty Natatorium ====
Liberty Natatorium is 75,000 square feet and contains a 9-lane Olympic-size swimming pool as well as a diving well 17 feet deep and fitted with 1-meter and 3-meter springboards and 10-meter, 7.5-meter, 5-meter, 3-meter, and 1-meter diving platforms. The inaugural competitive swimming event held in the swimming pool was the 2018 TYR Junior National Cup in March 2018. In 2020, one of the diving platforms collapsed for an unknown reason. Problems with the Daktronics race-timing system led the school to replace it after just three years.

=== Liberty Mountain ===
The Liberty Mountain area consists of the Hydaway Outdoor Center and its 31-acre lake, the Liberty University Equestrian Center, Liberty Mountain Gun Club, Liberty Mountain Snowflex Centre, Astronomical Observatory and the Liberty Mountain Trail System.

== Faculty and governance ==
Liberty University has 735 full-time instructors and 3,075 part-time instructors for more than 96,000 students. The university is governed by a 30-member board of trustees that includes Jonathan Falwell, the son and brother (respectively) of the two former university presidents. Unlike most other research universities, faculty (outside the law school) are not offered tenure, giving them less influence in governing the university than is common. Most teachers are adjunct labor. Faculty must inform school officials before they speak with the media.

Dondi E. Costin is the university's president, having assumed the position on July 1, 2023, taking over from Jerry Prevo.

=== Affiliation ===
The university has historically been affiliated with the Southern Baptist Convention, due to Thomas Road Baptist Church's affiliation with the Southern Baptist Convention of Virginia, but since 2021, it has stated that it "does not align with a particular denomination", and categorizes itself as broadly evangelical. Thomas Road Baptist Church remains a member of the Southern Baptist Convention, and as of 2026, still lists Liberty as a part of the church's "Outreach". Likewise, the Southern Baptist Convention still lists Liberty, as of 2026, as a SBC University. Since 1999, Liberty has had an informal relationship with the organization; two of its members sit on the university's board of trustees.

== Academics ==
=== Student outcomes ===
According to the College Scorecard, Liberty University has a graduation rate of 44% (Midpoint for all 4-yr Colleges: 59%). Median salary 10 years after attending is $57,000 (Midpoint for 4-yr Colleges: $60,377), with B.S. Air Transportation being the highest-earning major, earning a median salary of $102,096 after 4 years. 64% earn more than a high school graduate. Of those repaying student undergraduate federal loans two years after entering repayment, 26% were in forbearance, 25% were not making progress, 14% were making progress, 14% were in deferment, 9% defaulted, 5% were paid in full, 5% were delinquent, and 2% had their loans discharged.

=== Rankings ===
Academic rankings

National
- U.S. News & World Report: 395-434
- Washington Monthly: 556
- WSJ/College Pulse: 572

Liberty University was listed as 395-to-434th among "National Universities" in the 2026 U.S. News & World Report. It was ranked 428 out of 442 schools by the Washington Monthly in 2022.

In 2018, Liberty was among the ten colleges that enrolled the most undergraduates in the fall semester and, when including online students, enrolled the most students of any U.S. university.

In 2023, Liberty had an endowment of $1.71 billion, 43rd-largest among U.S. colleges and universities.

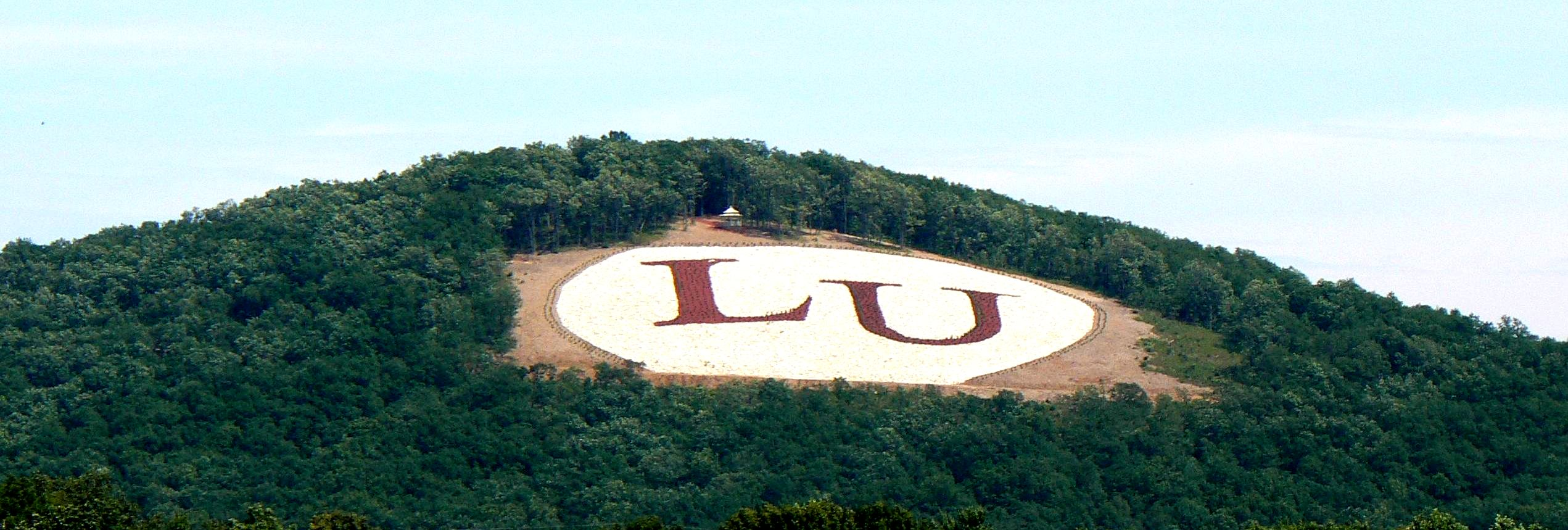
The initials of Liberty University, on Candler Mountain, as viewed from near campus. In early 2022, this monogram was changed into the Liberty Flames logo.

Liberty was ranked as the "Most Conservative College in America" by niche.com in 2016 and 2018, but by 2023 had been replaced by Brigham Young University.

=== Accreditation ===
Liberty is accredited by the Southern Association of Colleges and Schools (Level VI). In addition to institutional accreditation, many programs have programmatic accreditation granted by the following specialized agencies:

- Aviation Accreditation Board International (AABI)
- Commission on Accreditation of Athletic Training Education (CAATE)
- Accreditation Council for Business Schools and Programs (ACBSP)
- Accreditation Board for Engineering and Technology (ABET)
- Council for Accreditation of Counseling and Related Educational Programs (CACREP)
- Commission on Accrediting of the Association of Theological Schools (ATS)
- Council for the Accreditation of Educator Preparation (CAEP)
- Virginia Department of Education (VDOE)
- Association Of Christian Schools International (ACSI)
- Commission for the Accreditation of Allied Health Education Programs (CAAHEP)
- Forensic Science Education Programs Accreditation Commission (FEPAC)
- American Bar Association (ABA)
- National Association of Schools of Music (NASM)
- Commission on Collegiate Nursing Education (CCNE)
- Commission on Osteopathic College Accreditation (COCA)
- Council on Education for Public Health (CEPH)
- Commission on Accreditation for Respiratory Care (CoARC)
- Council on Social Work Education (CSWE)
- Commission on Sport Management Accreditation (COSMA)

Liberty was previously accredited by the Transnational Association of Christian Colleges and Schools (TRACS) in September 1984, but resigned its TRACS accreditation on November 6, 2008.

== Colleges and schools ==
Liberty University Colleges and Schools
College/school
Aeronautics
Applied Studies and Academic Success (CASAS)
Arts and Sciences
Behavioral Sciences
Business
Communication and the Arts
Divinity
Education
Engineering
General Studies
Government
Health Sciences
Law
Music
Nursing
Osteopathic Medicine
Visual and Performing Arts

As of August 2017, Liberty University offered over 550 total programs, 366 on campus and 289 online. There are 144 graduate programs and four doctoral programs offered on campus. It is classified among "Doctoral/Professional Universities" and is recognized by the National Security Agency (NSA) and the Department of Homeland Security as a National Center of Academic Excellence in Cyber Defense Education.

In 2017, Forbes's list of America's Top Colleges ranked Liberty University No. 585 of 650 "Top Colleges", No. 231 as a "Research University", 371 as a "Private College", and 136 "in the South". Forbes also gave Liberty a "Forbes Financial Grade" of B+.

=== Center for Law and Government ===
Since 2017, Liberty Helms School of Government and School of Law have been housed by the Center for Law and Government. Former U.S. representative Robert Hurt led the center at its inception, until stepping down in 2023. It is now chaired by former Secretary of State Mike Pompeo.

==== Helms School of Government ====
Liberty's Helms School of Government offers degrees in areas including criminal justice, government and public administration, international relations, pre-law, public policy, strategic intelligence, fire administration in both at both bachelor's and master's degree levels. In 2004, Liberty University named their School of Government after Jesse Helms, the U.S. senator from North Carolina; he was a Falwell family friend. Jason Bohm is the current Dean.

==== School of Law ====
82% of Liberty University School of Law's Class of 2018 obtained full-time, bar passage, or JD-required employment nine months after graduation, according to ABA-required disclosures. The law school has been accredited by the American Bar Association since 2010. In February 2019, all of its graduates who took the Virginia Bar Exam passed. The school was ranked 140 out of 196 law schools ranked by the U.S. News & World Report in its 2024 law school rankings.

=== College of Applied Studies and Academic Success ===
Liberty University's College of Applied Studies and Academic Success is a student support center that houses the Academic Success Center, the Eagle Scholar's Program, and oversees Technical Studies, Continuing Education, and Success Courses.

=== College of Arts and Sciences ===
The Liberty University College of Arts and Sciences houses Liberty's history, humanities, mathematics, and family and consumer sciences departments, and offers PhD, master's, bachelor's, and associate degrees.

=== College of Health Sciences ===
Liberty's Health Sciences classes are held in the campus's Center for Natural Sciences. Programs offered include

Creation Hall, on the second floor of the Center for Natural Sciences, is "dedicated to promoting young-Earth creation". Displays include replicas claimed to be of post-Flood humans and fossils allegedly buried during Noah's flood.

According to its literature, the Center for Creation Studies aims to study the origin of the universe, the earth, life, and diversification of species, equipping students to contend for their faith in the creation account in Genesis using science, reason, and the Scriptures. Dr. Timothy Brophy is the director of the Center for Creation Studies as of 2026.

The university previously required a "Creation Studies" class for all undergraduate students to graduate, but it ceased to have that requirement starting during the 2020-2021 school year. Liberty currently offers a Creation Studies minor, and evolutionary biology is taught in scientific courses.

=== College of Osteopathic Medicine ===
The Liberty University College of Osteopathic Medicine (LUCOM) opened in August 2014, funded in part by a $12 million matching grant from the Virginia Tobacco Commission.

In July 2015, the college of osteopathic medicine opened Liberty Mountain Medical Group LLC, a primary care clinic serving the greater Lynchburg area.

The college received initial accreditation from the American Osteopathic Association Commission on Osteopathic College Accreditation (AOA-COCA) in 2018. In that same year the medical school launched its first residency program, focused on neuromusculoskeletal treatment.

The Freedom Tower, which houses the Rawlings School of Divinity, was completed in February 2018. At 275 feet, it is the tallest building in Lynchburg.

=== Rawlings School of Divinity ===
The Liberty University Rawlings School of Divinity offers 44 bachelor's degrees, 44 master's degrees, and 14 doctoral degrees. It was formed in 2015 as a merger of the School of Religion with Liberty Baptist Theological Seminary. Many programs are on-campus only, while others are available online. The school includes the Center for Apologetics & Cultural Engagement, the Center for Church Advancement, the Center for Youth Ministries, the Center for Chaplaincy, and the Rawlings Scriptorium Museum. The Rawlings School of Divinity is housed in Freedom Tower. Under the umbrella of the Rawlings School of Divinity, the Willmington School of the Bible (WSB) is an online Graduate of Theology Diploma (Th.G) program designed for students who desire a deeper understanding of the Bible, Christian ministry, church history, and theology, but do not wish to complete a full degree program.

==== Liberty Theological Seminary ====
Within the Rawlings School, Liberty Theological Seminary administers the graduate, postgraduate, doctoral, and certificate divinity programs. It is the nation's largest seminary by enrollment and is accredited by the ATS. The seminary was relaunched in 2024.

=== School of Aeronautics ===
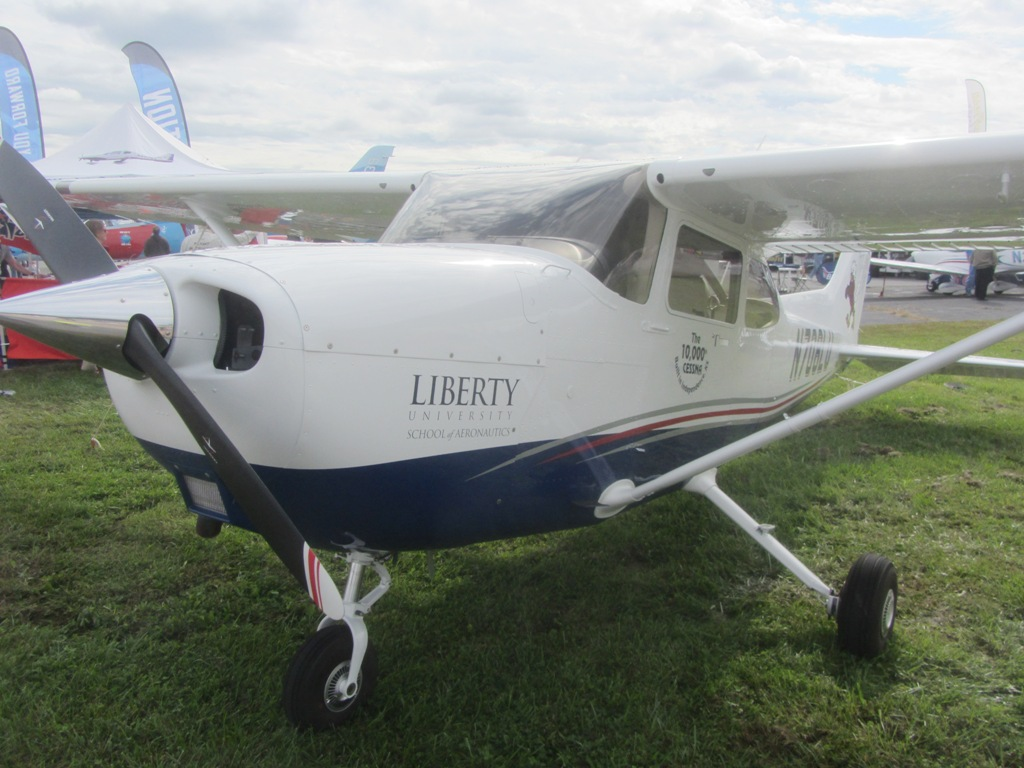
Liberty University School of Aeronautics Cessna 172

Liberty offers 11 bachelor's degrees in aeronautics, from professional pilot to UAS. In 2018, Liberty's School of Aeronautics had more than 1,200 students in-person and online. Liberty has worked with American Eagle, Piedmont Airlines, and Wayman Aviation to alleviate their pilot shortages.

=== School of Behavioral Sciences ===
The School of Behavioral Sciences includes four departments: Community Care & Counseling, Counselor Education & Family Studies, Psychology, and Social Work. It has an acceptance rate of 38%. The Community Care & Counseling department offers 28 master's degrees and four doctoral degrees. The Counselor Education & Family Studies department offers five master's degrees and one doctoral degree. The Psychology department offers two associate degrees, 14 bachelor's degrees, six master's degrees, and six doctoral degrees. The Social Work department offers one bachelor's degree. As of 2020, the dean was Kenyon C. Knapp.

=== School of Business ===
Liberty University's School of Business offers 46 bachelor's, 67 master's, and 14 doctoral degrees. Liberty's school of business is accredited by ACBSP. In 2019, the School of Business relocated to a new 78,000-sq.-ft. building.

=== School of Communication & the Arts ===
The School of Communication & the Arts has five departments: Cinematic Arts, Digital Media and Journalism, Strategic and Personal Communication, Studio & Digital Arts, and Theatre Arts. More than 12,000 residential and online students enroll in this school.

=== School of Education ===
Liberty's School of Education offers degrees in the education fields, offering both education centric degrees, as well as "Content Area Specializations". As of 2022 the School of Education enrolled 4,441 students.

=== School of Engineering ===
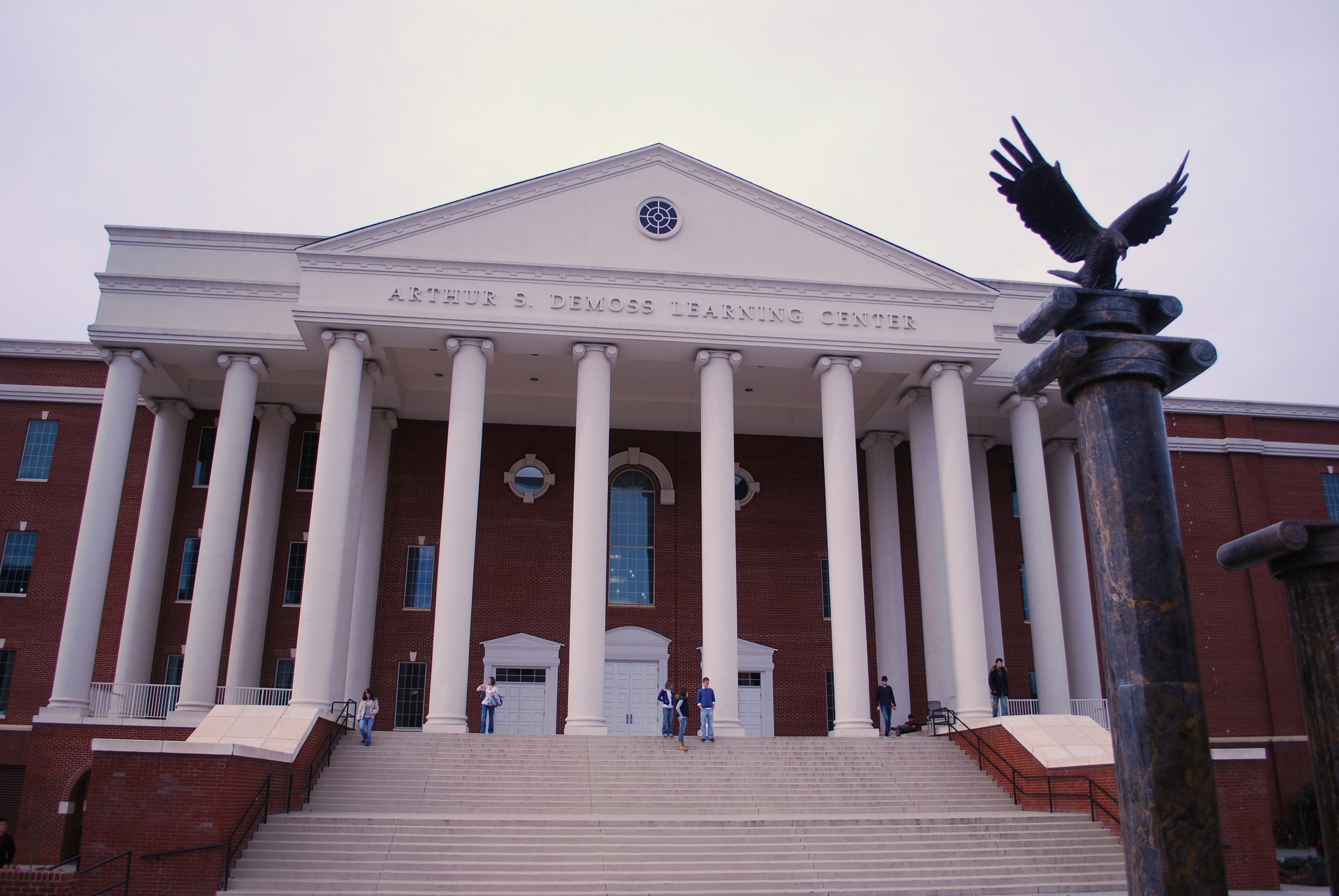
Liberty's DeMoss Hall, the campus's main academic building exhibiting Jeffersonian architecture

Liberty's School of Engineering offers degrees in computer engineering, civil engineering, electrical engineering, industrial & systems engineering, and mechanical engineering. The engineering program is accredited through the Accreditation Board for Engineering and Technology (ABET). In 2017, Liberty bought the Center for Advanced Engineering and Research (CAER) facility in Bedford, Virginia.

The School of Engineering led a project titled "Simulating Genesis" to "show how the laws of physics align with biblical history" including the Genesis flood narrative, in 2024.

=== School of Music ===
The departments of worship and music studies and of music and humanities merged in 2012 into a school of music, composed of two distinct centers. The School of Music offers 32 bachelor's degrees, 15 master's degrees, and four doctoral degrees. Liberty University has a comprehensive band program. The Spirit of the Mountain is the official marching band of the university, performing in a corps style at Liberty football home games and other events. Liberty also has orchestras, concert bands, a pep band, and an in indoor drumline which competes in Winter Guard International.

=== Technical studies and trades ===
Along with over 15 other associate programs, Liberty offers vocational education with various associate degrees in carpentry; electrical; heating, ventilation, air conditioning (HVAC); plumbing; and welding. These trades are approved by the National Center for Construction Education and Research.

== Student life ==
=== Convocation ===
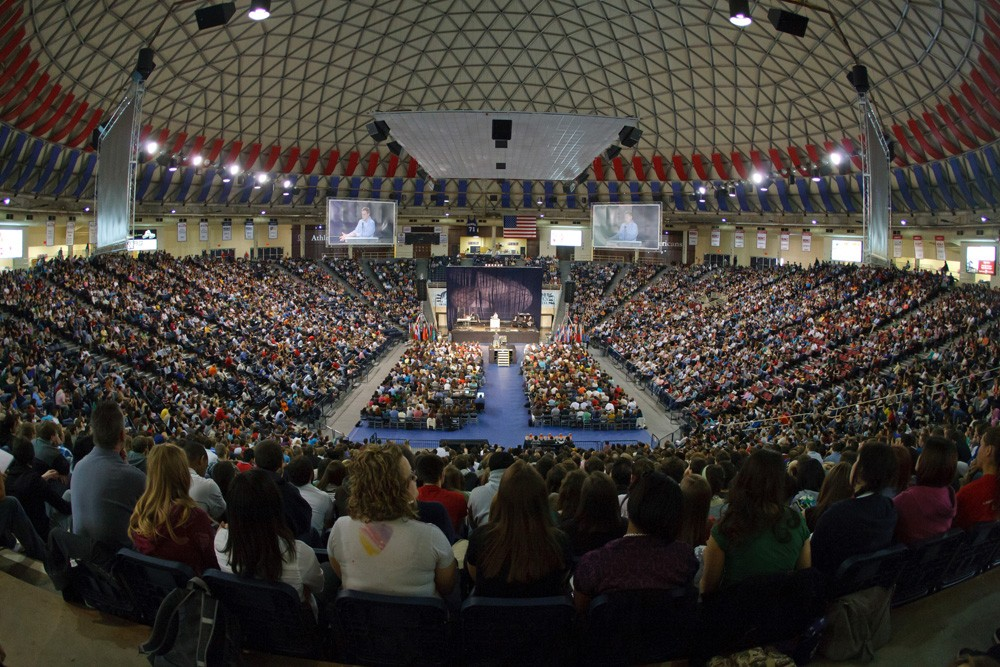
Convocation at the Vines Center

Liberty's convocation, held at the Vines Center on Wednesdays and Fridays, is the largest weekly gathering of Christian students in America.

Attendance is mandatory for residential undergraduate and graduate students and commuter students under 21 years of age. They must report to their assigned Resident Assistant and sit in their assigned section, though they may skip Convocation once per semester if they notify their Resident Assistant at least 24 hours in advance. They are fined $25 for each of their first two unexcused absences, and $50 for each subsequent absence. Commuting students are encouraged, but not required, to attend convocation.

Convocation guests have included pastors, athletes, motivational speakers, and political speakers, who are usually conservative. These include former vice president Mike Pence in 2022 and democratic socialist senator Bernie Sanders in 2015. In 2017, the school invited Ray Rice, who had been videotaped committing domestic violence against his fiancée three years earlier, to speak at convocation.

=== Clubs and organizations ===
According to Liberty's student government, there are over 150 registered on-campus clubs and organizations.

=== Demographics ===
Student body composition as of October 5, 2026
Race and ethnicity	Total
White	57%
Other (Note: Other consists of Multiracial Americans & those who prefer to not say.)	17%
Black	11%
Hispanic	8%
Asian	2%
Foreign national	1%
Two or more races	4%
Economic diversity
Low-income (Note: The percentage of students who received an income-based federal Pell grant intended for low-income students.)	40%
Affluent (Note: The percentage of students who are a part of the American middle class at the bare minimum.)	60%

In fall 2017, the acceptance rate for new first-time, full-time students entering Liberty's resident program was 30%. In 2011, the overall acceptance rate, which includes online students, was 51 percent. Liberty University Online is an open enrollment institution.

Liberty's Black population has declined from 19.9 percent in 2011 to 10.4 percent in 2019, with a graduation rate of 17% among full-time Black students.

==== On-campus demographics ====
As of 2021, the residential student body is 74% White, 5% Latino, 4% Black, 3% two or more races, and 2% Asian or Pacific Islander, less than 1% Native American, and 7% "other". Its male-to-female ratio is 45% to 54%.

==== Online demographics ====
Including online students, Liberty's undergraduate population in 2017 was 51% White, 26.5% race/ethnicity unknown, 15.4% Black or African American, 2.3% two or more races, 1.7% Hispanic/Latino, 1.4% non-resident alien, 0.9% Asian, 0.6% American Indian or Alaskan native, 0.2% Native Hawaiian/Pacific Islander. All 50 states and Washington, D.C., are represented along with 86 countries. The online male-to-female ratio is 40% to 60%. More than 30,000 military students and over 850 international students attend Liberty.

Liberty ranks 174th out of 2,475 schools in overall diversity, 94th out of 3,012 schools in age diversity, and 82nd out of 2,525 schools in location diversity.

As of 2010, when including online students, LU was the largest Evangelical Christian university in the world. As of 2013, LU was the largest private non-profit university in the United States. In terms of combined traditional and distance learning students, Liberty University is the 7th-largest four-year university, and the largest university in Virginia.

==== LGBTQ+ stance ====
Words and actions indicating "LGBT states of mind" are prohibited for students as of the 2021 version of The Liberty Way, the student handbook. Sexual relations are only permitted in a Biblically ordained marriage between a man and a woman. The student handbook says gay sex is prohibited by the Bible, and thus by the school. Kissing, holding hands, or dating a member of the same sex are also prohibited under The Liberty Way.

Students have criticized the university for being unwelcoming to LGBT students. The Guardian has reported that LGBTQ+ students hide their dating behavior in order to graduate and to avoid being fined. Campus Pride, an organization that advocates for LGBT rights on college campuses, listed Liberty University as one of the worst universities for LGBT students. The school offers conversion therapy to gay students, a practice that peer-reviewed studies have shown is ineffective and harmful.

In 2015, Liberty University denied the discounted tuition to same-sex and trans spouses of military personnel that it offered to heterosexual military couples. In 2016, the university ordered a version of a psychology textbook that omitted sections with LGBTQ+-focused content. In March 2021, a former Liberty University student was part of a class action lawsuit filed against the U.S. Department of Education alleging that the institution should not be eligible to receive federal funding because of its discriminatory practices against LGBT students. Later that year in July, Liberty University diversity retention officer LeeQuan McLaurin, a black gay man, filed a discrimination lawsuit against the school, claiming that his supervisor's view that Christianity condemns homosexuality forced him to quit.

The school says it does not engage in unlawful discrimination or harassment because of race, color, ancestry, religion, age, sex, national origin, pregnancy or childbirth, disability or military veteran status. But it "reserves its right to discriminate on the basis of religion to the extent that applicable law respects its right to act in furtherance of its religious objectives."

=== Honor code ===
The Liberty University honor code forbids students to be alone with a member of the opposite sex "at an off-campus residence" or to have premarital sex anywhere. Students may not consume alcohol or tobacco. In 2015, Liberty revised the code to allow students to watch R-rated movies and to play video games rated "M". In 2017, the curfew policy was changed to permit students age 20 and over to sign out and stay out past curfew. In 2018, the administration rejected a resolution from the student government that would have allowed off-campus drinking, "profane language", and the use of tobacco.

=== Liberty Champion ===
The Liberty Champion has been Liberty University's official student-written, faculty-run newspaper since 1983.

=== Reserve Officers' Training Corps ===
Liberty is home to an Army Reserve Officers' Training Corps detachment. Students are also able to join an Air Force Reserve Officer Training Corps detachment, but it is primarily a part of the Air Force ROTC program based out of the University of Virginia.

In September 2026, Secretary of Defense Pete Hegseth announced the creation of the "America's Corps of Cadets" program, under which Liberty was designated a "Distinguished Military College". A Department of Defense memo directed Liberty to create their own "Corps of Cadets", similar to the six Senior Military Colleges. The memo also described the designation as a "steppingstone towards becoming" a Senior Military College if Liberty chooses to do so.

=== Safety ===
In 2021, a dozen anonymous women sued the school, charging that it failed to curb domestic violence and sexual assault on campus. A 2021 ProPublica investigation found that "an ethos of sexual purity, as embodied by the Liberty Way, has led to school officials discouraging, dismissing and even blaming female students who have tried to come forward with claims of sexual assault."

The school sought for years to conceal campus crime and safety statistics, according to a preliminary 2023 report by the U.S. Department of Education reviewed by the Washington Post. The report, whose findings may yet be appealed by the school, documents alleged violations of the Clery Act, which requires schools that receive federal money to disclose crime and safety statistics. Instead, the report indicates, university officials destroyed documentation and failed to notify the campus of sexual predators, bomb threats, and gas leaks. In March 2024 the U.S. Department of education fined the university $14 million for its treatment of sexual assault survivors and the misclassification or underreporting of crimes. Victims were afraid to report crimes for fear of reprisals or were punished for violating the student code by administrators.

=== Speech and debate ===
Liberty's Inter-Collegiate policy debate program ranked first overall (i.e., combining the results at the varsity, junior varsity, and novice levels) for their division at the National Debate Tournament in 2006, 2007, 2009, 2010, and 2011. (Note: Attributed to multiple sources:) In varsity rankings, Liberty finished 20th in 2005, 17th in 2006, 24th in 2007, 12th in 2008, 9th in 2009, 4th in 2010, and 4th in 2011. In 2017, the team finished atop the final rankings of all three national debate tournaments for the eighth time, sweeping the American Debate Association, the Cross Examination Debate Association (CEDA), and the National Debate Tournament (NDT). As of 2017, Liberty was the only school to finish first in all three in a single year. As well, it had placed first in the CEDA for eight straight years, first in the NDT for seven of those, and first in the ADA for 13 of the last 14.

Through 2016, Liberty hosted the Virginia High School League's annual Debate State Championships each April. VHSL stopped holding debate competitions at the school after Chancellor Falwell said students should arm themselves to "end those Muslims" who committed the 2015 San Bernardino attack. League officials said they sought an "environment free from harassment, personal threat, or physical or mental harm."

== Athletics ==
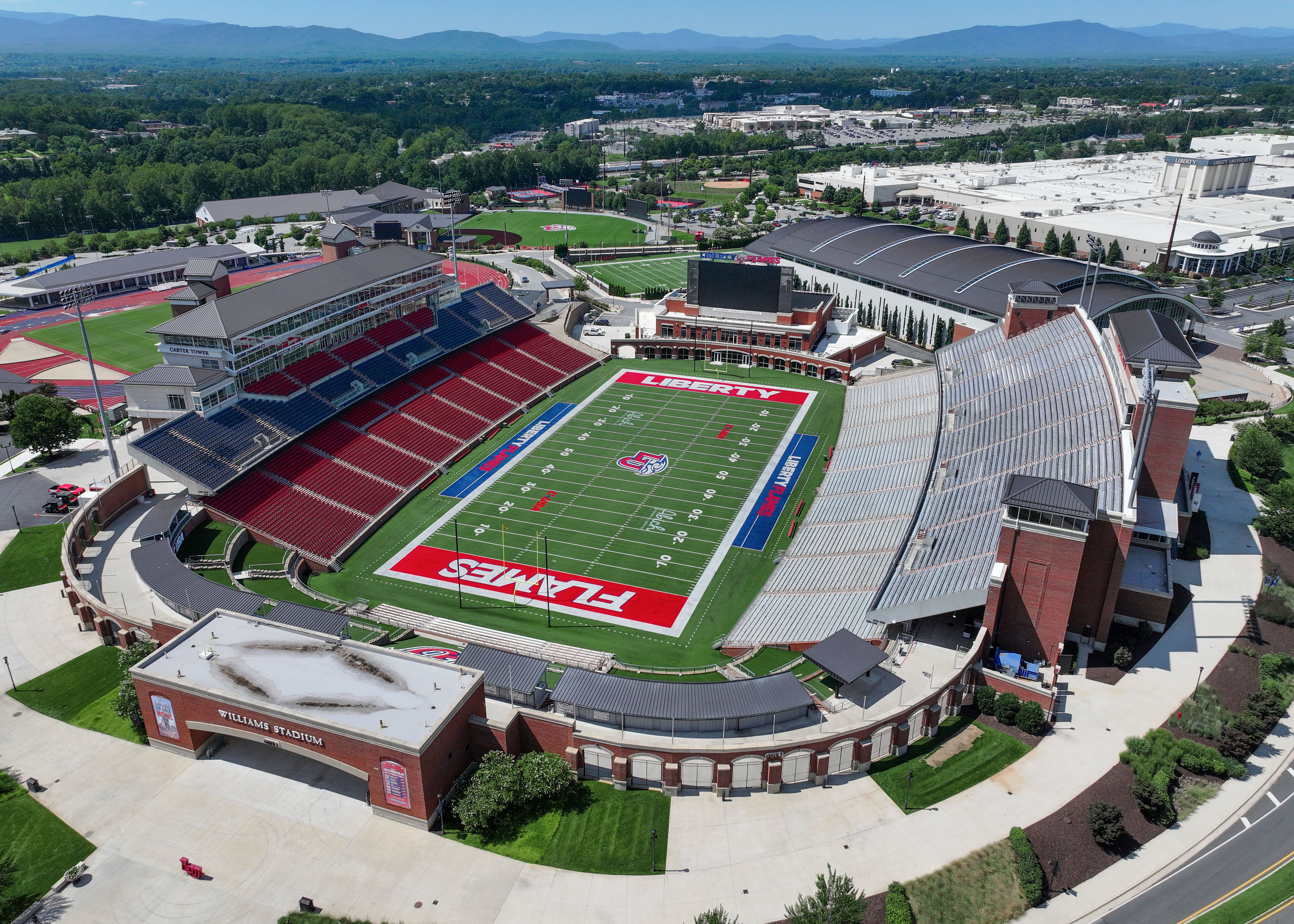
Liberty University Williams Stadium

Liberty's athletic teams compete in Division I of the NCAA and are collectively known as the Liberty Flames. Liberty is a member of the Conference USA for 17 of its 20 varsity sports. Women's swimming competes in the Coastal Collegiate Sports Association, and women's field hockey competes in the Big East Conference. The field hockey team had belonged to the Northern Pacific Field Hockey Conference before that league's demise after the 2014 season. It competed as an independent in the 2015 season, then join the Big East Conference for the 2016 season. Starting in 2018, the football team began competing in the FBS as an independent. In 2020, Liberty entered the rankings in the AP Poll at 25 for the first time in program history. They finished the season being ranked 17 in the AP Poll and 18 in the Coaches Poll of top football teams in the country.

While it was a part of the Big South, Liberty regularly competed for the Sasser Cup, the conference's trophy for the university that has the best sports program among the member institutions. In 2012, Liberty became the first Big South school to win five consecutive Sasser Cups.

=== Football ===
As of the 2023 season, the Liberty Flames compete in NCAA Division I Football Bowl Subdivision (FBS) as a member of Conference USA. The team used Lynchburg's City Stadium as their home stadium until October 21, 1989, when the Flames played their first home game at Williams Stadium. The Flames won their first three bowl games: the Cure Bowl in 2019 and 2020 and the LendingTree Bowl in 2021. Since 2022, the Flames' head coach has been Jamey Chadwell. In 2023, the Flames went undefeated (12–0) in the regular season, the first Division-I team from Virginia to do so, and won the CUSA Championship Game. On January 1, 2024, they played in their first New Year's 6 bowl, the Vrbo Fiesta Bowl, against the Pac-12 Oregon Ducks, losing 45–6.

=== Basketball ===
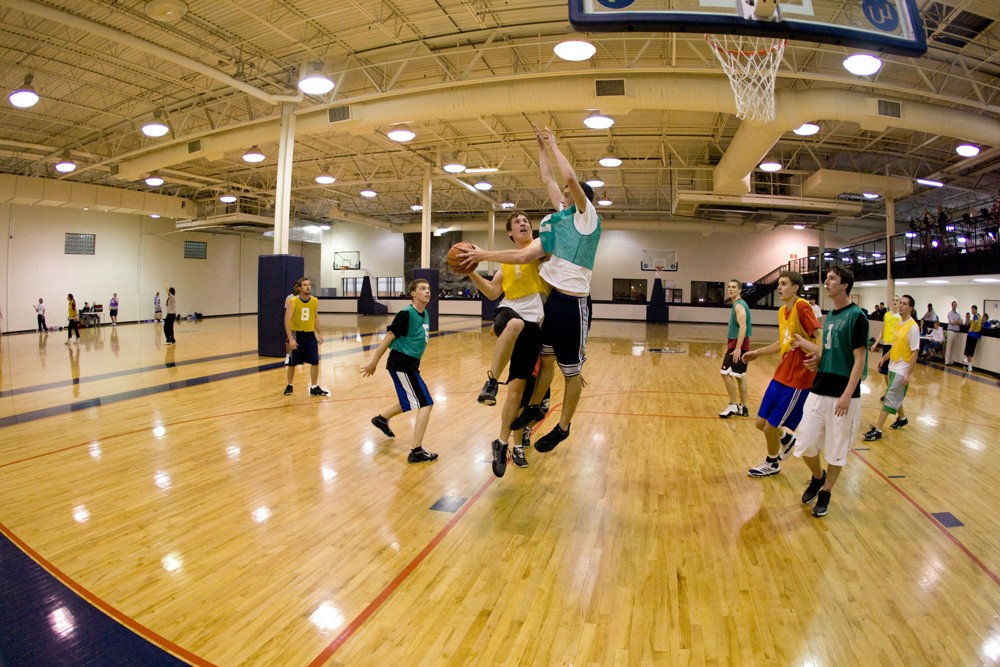
Intramural basketball game at the university's LaHaye Student Center

Liberty University's basketball teams play most home games in the 4,000-seat Liberty Arena; some are moved to the 9,547-seat Vines Center. Several members of the men's Liberty Flames have been recruited to the NBA. The women's Liberty Lady Flames was honored by the Big South "with the Top 25 'Best of the Best' moments in League history from 1983–2008; with Liberty University's 10-year women's basketball championship run from 1996–2007 was crowned the No. 1 moment in the Big South's first 25 years."

In 2019, the men's basketball program won the Atlantic Sun Conference basketball tournament and earned an automatic bid to the NCAA basketball tournament. Liberty earned its highest ranking ever when it was selected as the No. 12 seed in the East Region. Liberty set a school record with their 29th win as they upset Mississippi State 80–76 in the first round of the East Region in the 2019 NCAA tournament.

=== Baseball ===
The Liberty Baseball Stadium, completed in June 2013 and home to Liberty Baseball, was ranked No. 4 among college ballpark experiences by Stadium Journey website in 2015. The stadium includes 2,500 chairbacks, locker room, four indoor batting tunnels, four luxury suites, offices for the baseball program, a weight room, team room and a fully functional press area. Several Liberty Flames baseball players were drafted during the 2015 Major League Baseball draft. Local stations air some games. Some games have aired nationally on ESPNU.

=== Ice hockey ===
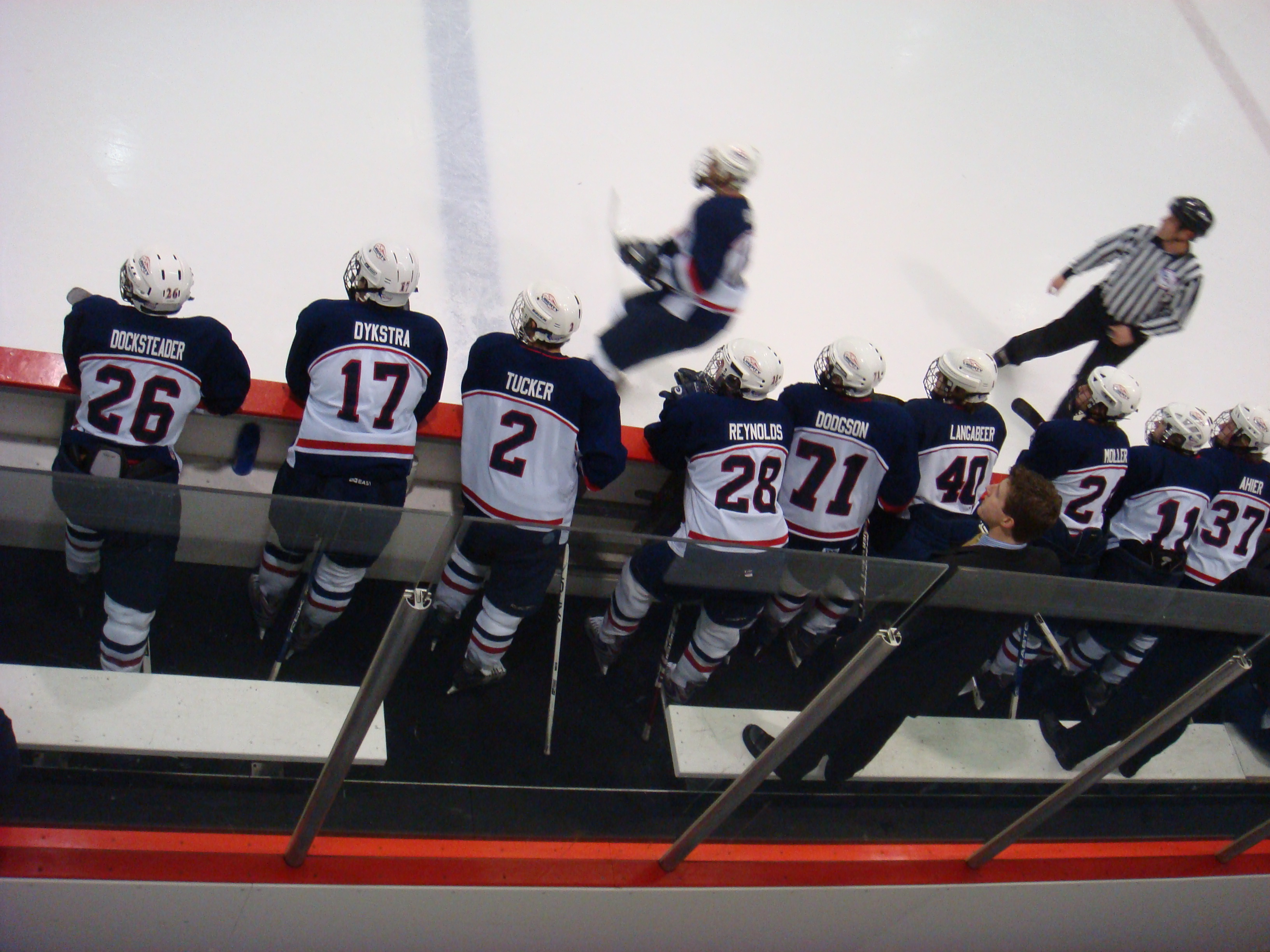
Liberty Hockey Team

Liberty University has men's and women's club ice hockey teams. Men's hockey started in 1985 when Liberty students organized a team to play surrounding colleges and clubs but has since become a competitive club team competing against much larger schools such as University of Oklahoma, University of Delaware, and Penn State University.

In January 2006, Liberty became the only Virginia school with a men's ACHA Division I club hockey team; and opened the 3,000-seat LaHaye Ice Center, a gift of Timothy and Beverly LaHaye. The men's Division I team is coached by Kirk Handy. The women's team has won seven American Collegiate Hockey Association (ACHA) D1 national championships (2015, 2018-2023, 2025) and is currently coached by Chris Lowes.

=== Cross country ===
Individual NCAA Division I champions include Josh McDougal (2007) and Samuel Chelanga (2009–2010). Chelanga took two gold medals and three silvers in outdoor and indoor competition in three years and won All-American honors 14 times.

== Subsidiaries ==
=== Liberty University Online ===
Liberty University has an Internet education component called Liberty University Online, also known as LU Online or LUO, which provides degrees from associate's level to doctorate. Liberty University offers 100% online associate degrees and bachelor's degrees, as well as certificates, in many areas of study.

Online students constitute the overwhelming majority of the university's students and revenue, "subsidizing the university" and making them "a killing", according to faculty members, despite the "steep drop-off in quality from the traditional college to the online courses." Critics have argued that the online division subsidizes campus resources, such as the ski resort and gun range, and that online enrollment is run in a boiler room fashion. Online instructors are mainly engaged in answering emails and grading rather than creating and delivering content.

=== Liberty University Online Academy ===
Established in 2007, the Liberty University Online Academy (LUOA) is a K-12 private school serving about 18,000 students for academically talented students worldwide. It is accredited by SACS (Southern Association of Schools and Colleges). In 2018, The New York Times reported that Liberty faculty acknowledge that courses taken via the lucrative Liberty University Online program are worse than the university's traditional in-person classes.

=== Standing for Freedom Center ===
In November 2019, Liberty and Charlie Kirk of Turning Point USA launched a think tank subsidiary called the Falkirk Center for Faith and Liberty. The name was derived, in part, from the portmanteau combining the names of Jerry Falwell Jr. and Charlie Kirk, as well as Falwell's affinity for the film Braveheart and the Battle of Falkirk, which was depicted in the film. The think tank hired Trump attorney Jenna Ellis and Trump surrogate Sebastian Gorka as fellows and paid for political Facebook ads promoting Trump and other Republican candidates during the 2020 election campaign. In March 2021, the university renamed the organization the "Standing for Freedom Center", having chosen not to renew Kirk's contract several months earlier. In November 2021, the Standing for Freedom Center hosted former Secretary of State Mike Pompeo, author Eric Metaxas, and former Arkansas governor Mike Huckabee.

=== Publications ===
The Journal of Statesmanship and Public Policy explores topics in the realms of national security, international relations, domestic policy, and political philosophy from a deeply thoughtful, ethical, and Christian perspective." Recent articles have been published on strict constructionism and critical race theory.

== Finances, marketing, and recruitment ==
Much of Liberty's operating revenue comes from federal financial aid and other federal sources.

View source data.

In 2006, the university had net assets—cash, property, investments and other holdings—of roughly $100 million. At the start of Jerry Falwell Jr.'s presidency in 2007, the university listed $259 million in assets. Five years later, in May 2012, Falwell Jr. said the total had risen to $1 billion, thanks to proceeds from its online learning program and from accelerated facility expansion.

In December 2010, Liberty sold $120 million in facilities bonds to finance expansion. It sold an additional $100 million in taxable bonds in January 2012 to help finance $225.2 million of planned capital projects around the campus over the next five years. The bond offering was part of Liberty University's campus transformation plan which included several renovations and additions to academic buildings and student housing, as well as fund the new Jerry Falwell Library and formation of the medical school. The bonds received a rating of "AA" from Standard & Poor's and in 2013 received an upgraded rating of "Aa3" along with a "stable outlook" projection from Moody's Investors Services based on "the increasing scope of the University's activity", "its large pool of financial reserves", "uncommonly strong operating performance", and "discipline around building and maintaining reserves".

In March 2017, Falwell Jr. said that the university's endowment stood at more than $1 billion and gross assets are in excess of $2 billion. The U.S. Department of Education rated Liberty as having a "perfect" financial responsibility score.

According to a 2018 report by The New York Times, most of Liberty University's revenue comes from taxpayer-funded sources. In 2018, Liberty students received more federal aid than all but five other schools, ProPublica reported. In 2019, Liberty University reportedly received about $700 million in federal funding.

In fiscal year 2020, Liberty University received $800 million from online tuition and $361 million from residential student tuition. In June 2021, Liberty University had $3.94 billion in assets and $474 million in liabilities. Its operating revenue was $1.15 billion and its operating expenses were $840 million. Its endowment was valued at $1.71 billion in fiscal year 2021. According to Third Way, Liberty uses less than 20 percent of its revenues for instruction.

In 2019, Falwell Jr. was accused of using the university for his family's financial benefit. (Note: Attributed to multiple sources: .) Staff members said the university has funneled tuition money into real estate investments that benefit friends and family of the Falwells, including a shopping mall owned by the university and managed by Falwell's son Trey, a university vice president. Falwell responded to the accusations by asserting that the FBI would investigate a "criminal conspiracy" in which individuals stole university property and shared it with reporters in an effort to damage his reputation.

=== Marketing and recruitment ===
In 2018, ProPublica and The New York Times reported that each of the university's 300 salespeople were pressured to enroll up to eight students per day. They were instructed to make the university appear more affordable by describing the tuition costs per credits rather than per course. They were also instructed to not tell potential students that among the first required classes are three Bible-studies classes whose credits are generally unaccepted by other universities—a condition that helps persuade students not to leave Liberty University for other universities.

A special team of 60 salespeople targeted members of the military because they had greater access to federal tuition assistance.

According to a former employee, the university accepts any student with a grade point average above 0.5 (equivalent to a D-minus).

==== Sponsorships ====
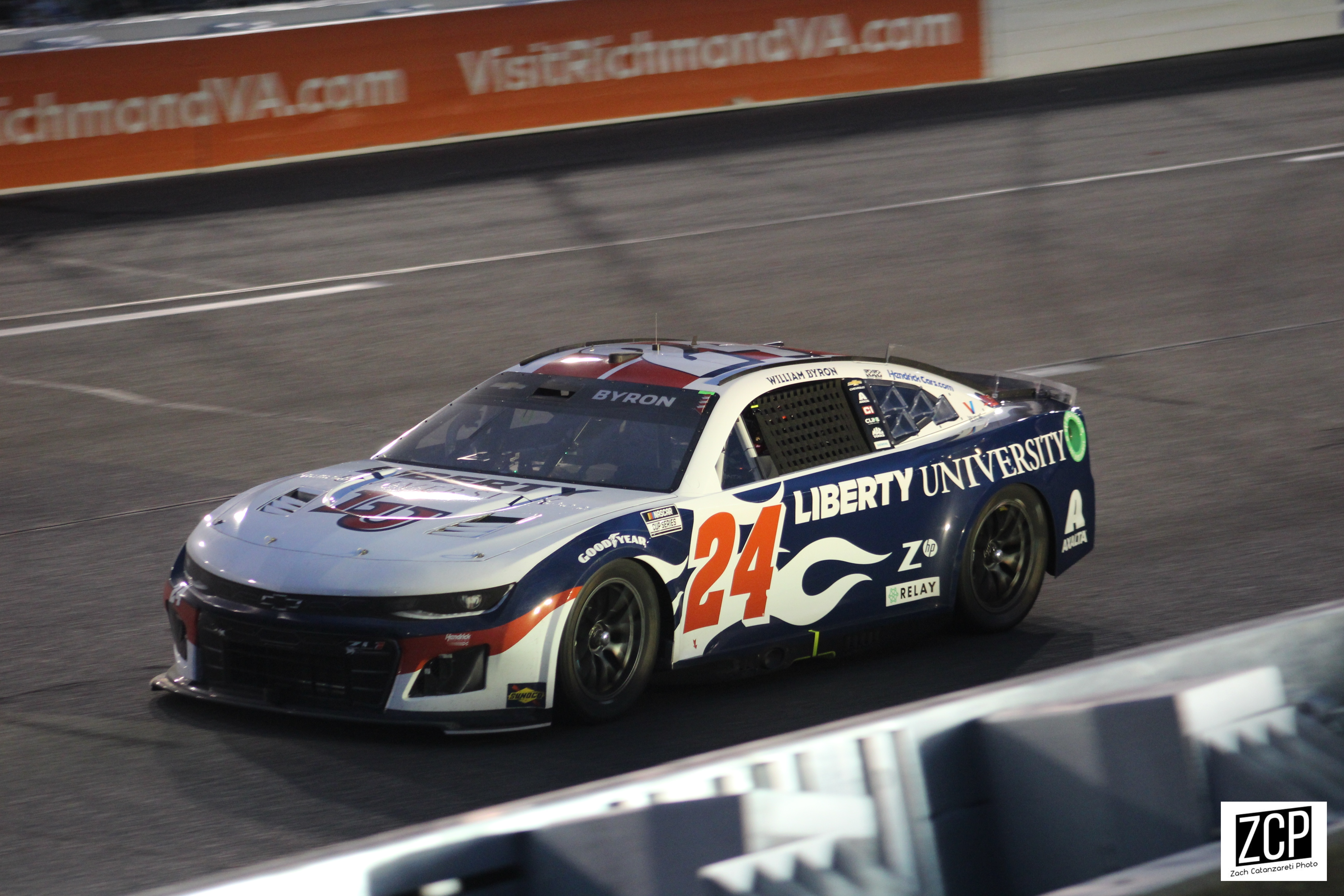
Wiliam Byron's Liberty-sponsored NASCAR car

Since 2014, Liberty University has sponsored NASCAR driver and LU alumnus William Byron in a late-model program run by Dale Earnhardt Jr.'s JR Motorsports. Liberty funds Byron and NASCAR Cup Series team Hendrick Motorsports through 2026.

=== Student loans and defaults ===
In 2010, Liberty students received about $445 million in federal financial aid money, the highest total of any school in Virginia and one of the highest in the country. A 56 percent increase over the previous year, the money was mostly in the form of student loans, but also included some grants and other forms of aid.

Liberty University students have a lower default rate compared to the national average of graduates from all schools. However, Liberty University students have a higher rate of defaults within three years of completing their studies compared to graduates of other private, non-profit, four-year colleges. Liberty University spends far less on instruction than traditional private universities, for-profit colleges and other nonprofit religious colleges.

In connection with being named to a Trump administration task force on deregulating higher education, university president Falwell alluded, as an example of regulatory overreach and "micromanagement", to Obama-era regulations that govern student loan forgiveness for students who have been cheated by fraudulent colleges.

== Politics ==
=== Influence ===
Senator Bernie Sanders delivering remarks at Liberty in September 2015

Liberty University has been described as a "stage of choice in Republican presidential politics", and a "pilgrimage site for GOP candidates." According to The Washington Post, Republican candidates are drawn to the university because it is viewed as a "bastion of the Christian right". Ronald Reagan's close relationship with the university gave it significant publicity in its early years. In 1990, 41st U.S. president George H. W. Bush was the first sitting U.S. president to speak at Liberty's commencement. In 1996, U.S. Supreme Court justice Clarence Thomas gave the commencement address at Liberty University.

Republican leaders Ronald Reagan, George W. Bush, Mitt Romney, Newt Gingrich, Jeb Bush, Bobby Jindal, and John McCain have visited the campus. The British politician Nigel Farrage visited the campus in 2020. Libertarian presidential candidate Gary Johnson spoke at the university during his 2016 campaign. In 2017, President Donald Trump gave his first college commencement speech as sitting president at Liberty University. In 2019, Vice President Mike Pence gave the school's commencement address. Liberty was a satellite location for CPAC 2019, hosting numerous conservative speakers on-campus. Additionally, conservative pundits such as Sean Hannity, Candace Owens, Tomi Lahren, Charlie Kirk, Oliver North, Glenn Beck, and Dinesh D'Souza have spoken at Liberty's convocation, all prior to 2020. (Note: Attributed to multiple sources:)

Democrats such as Ted Kennedy, Bernie Sanders, and Jesse Jackson have spoken at Liberty, and in 2018, former U.S. president Jimmy Carter gave the commencement speech. However, Barack Obama, Joe Biden, and Hillary Clinton have politely declined invitations to speak at LU.

In 2021, Interim President Jerry Prevo told Scott Lamb, then the university's senior vice president for communications and public engagement, that he wanted the school to become "a more effective political player by helping to influence elections." Prevo said getting conservative candidates elected was "one of our main goals". Politico wrote that his comments "raise new questions about the blurred line between education and politics at the university, which as a 501(c)(3) charity is not supposed to participate directly in political campaigns".

After Dondi Costin was named President in 2023, Costin said that he wanted there to be less of an emphasis on overt politics at Liberty, citing his experience as a general officer in the U.S. Air Force, and the restrictions he faced in that role.

=== 2015 concealed handguns remarks ===
In a December 5, 2015, convocation speech, President Jerry Falwell Jr. encouraged the student body to obtain concealed handgun permits. Falwell discussed the attack in San Bernardino and said, "If more good people had concealed-carry permits, then we could end those Muslims before they walked in." This was met with public condemnation for singling out the Muslim religion rather than the attack itself. Governor Terry McAuliffe called the statement "repugnant". Falwell later said he was referring to the Muslim shooters in the San Bernardino attack, not all Muslims.

=== Links to Donald Trump ===
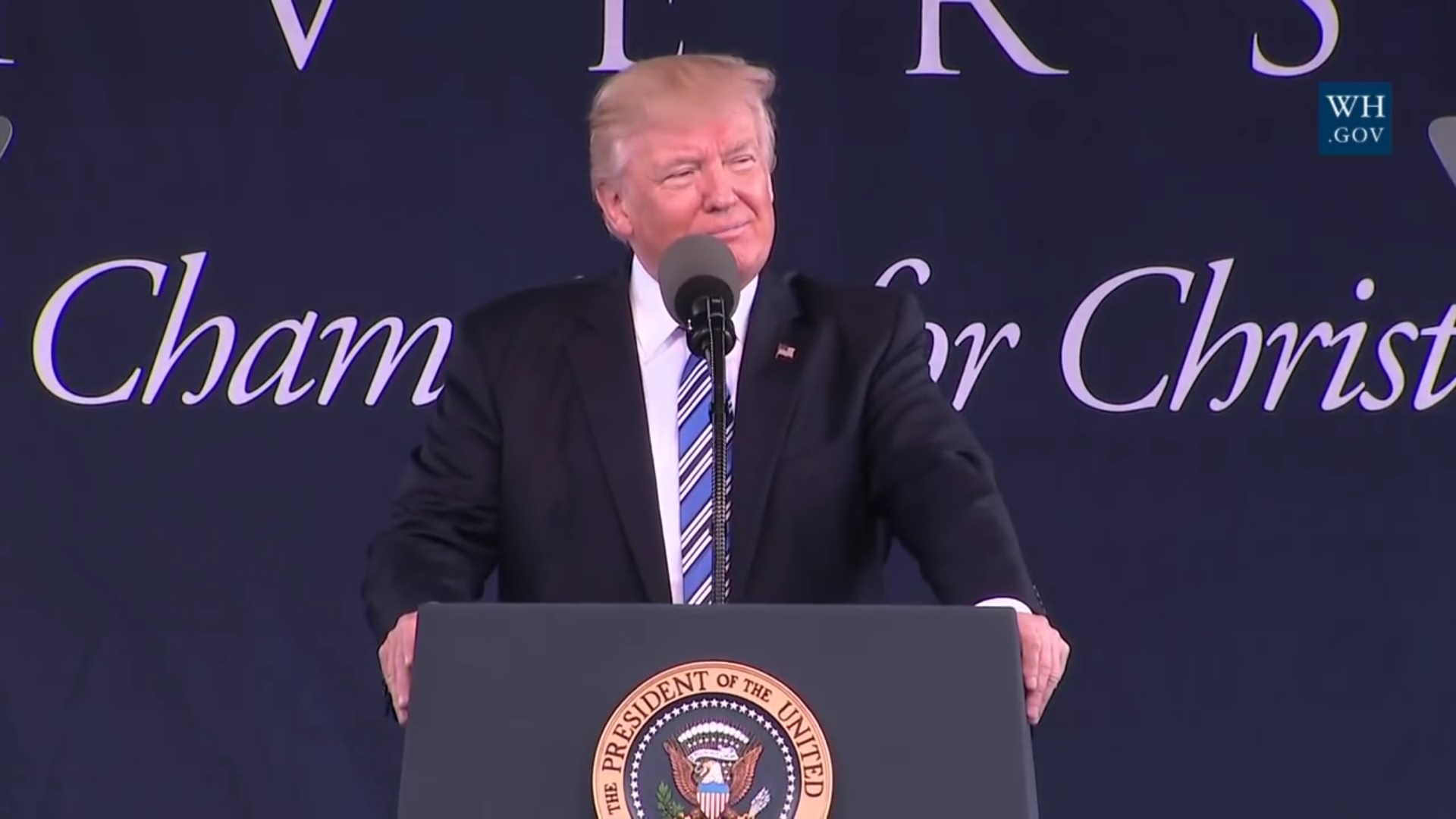
President Donald Trump speaks at Liberty University Commencement Ceremony

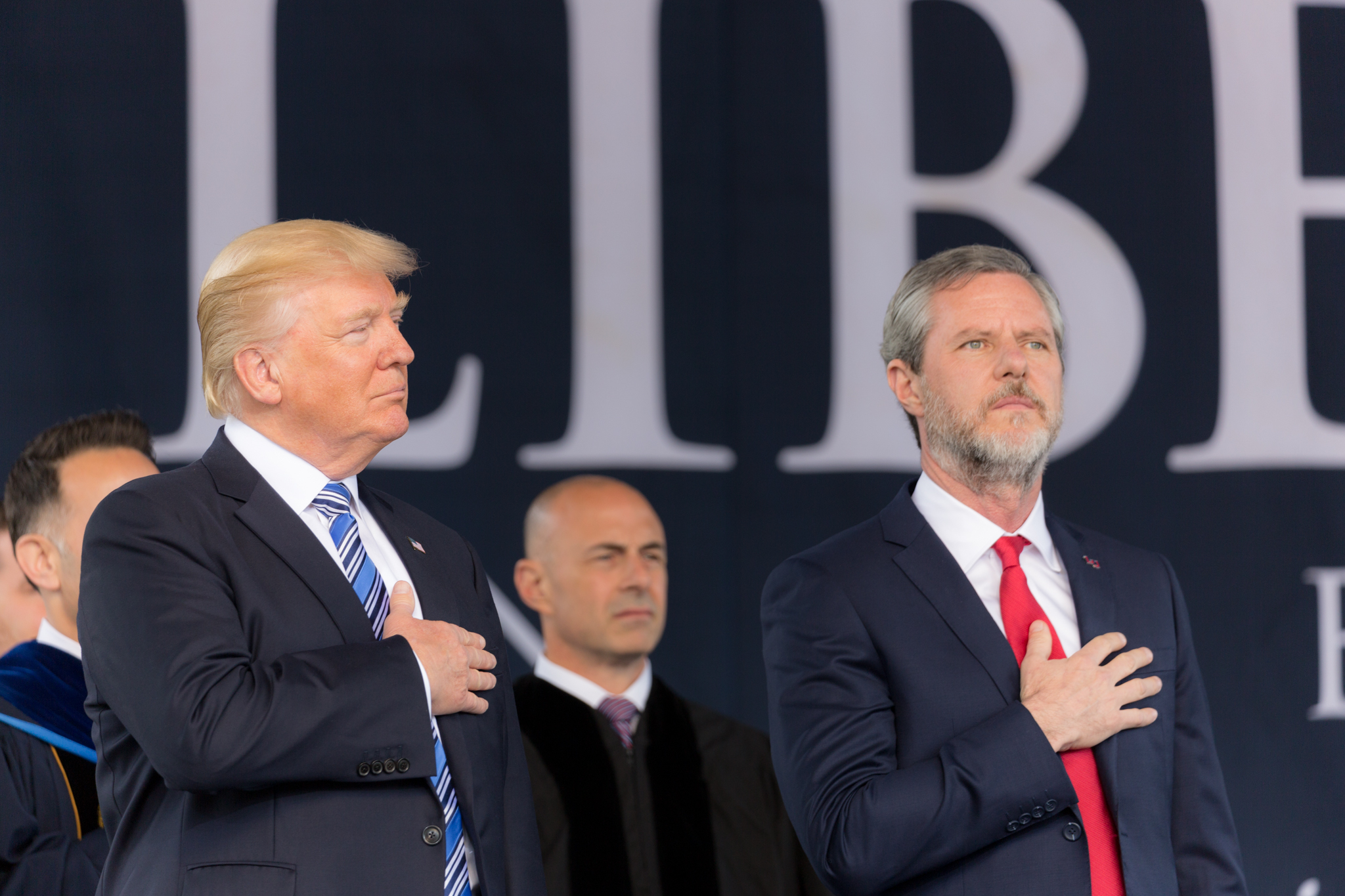
Donald Trump and Jerry Falwell Jr. at Liberty University's commencement ceremony in 2017

The school is noted for its official embrace of Donald Trump before and during his term as U.S. president. The businessman twice spoke at the university Convocation: in 2012, when he was awarded an honorary doctor of business degree, and in 2016. As U.S. president, Trump was the keynote speaker at the May 2017 commencement, when he received an honorary Doctor of Laws degree. Falwell Jr. commended Trump for "bombing those in the Middle East who persecute and kill Christians," and that Trump had "proved that he is a man of his word." As of 2022, three honorary degrees Trump received from other institutions have been rescinded, but Liberty has not rescinded the two it granted Trump.

Starting in 2016 when he endorsed Donald Trump, Falwell Jr. began reviewing and editing articles that were going to be published in the student-written newspaper, the Liberty Champion. On one occasion, Falwell made Champion editors end opinion pieces with a note on how they were voting. When one student editor refused to do so, a note was added to the end of the article saying that "[t]he writer refused to reveal which candidate she is supporting for president." Later in the same year, sports editor Joel Schmieg criticized Trump's calling the Access Hollywood tape as "locker room talk". Falwell refused to allow the piece to run, saying that the newspaper had one article about Trump that week, so the editor’s piece was redundant. When Schmieg posted on Facebook about the episode, the faculty advisor for the paper warned him not to do anything like that again. Schmieg chose to resign as a result, saying he "didn’t feel comfortable being told what I couldn’t write about by President Falwell."

Falwell Jr.'s uncritical support for Trump was characterized by critics as a repudiation of Christian values.

Various school officials and students criticized this support and the university's ties with Trump. Among them was Mark DeMoss, Falwell's chief of staff, who was forced to resign from Liberty's board of trustees. Another was Liberty alumnus Jonathan Merritt, whose invitation to speak on campus was rescinded.

In 2017, some students protested after President Trump criticized both white supremacists and counter-protesters at the August Charlottesville rally where three people died and 33 were injured. Following Trump's remarks, Falwell said that he was "so proud" of Trump for his "bold truthful" statement on the tragedy. A number of alumni returned their diplomas to Liberty University and called on the university to disavow Trump's remarks. The graduates argued that Trump's remarks were "incompatible with Liberty University's stated values, and incompatible with a Christian witness."

In 2018, some Liberty students went to Washington, D.C., to support President Trump's Supreme Court nominee Judge Brett Kavanaugh. That same year, students at the university gave a standing ovation to First Lady of the United States Melania Trump, along with several Trump cabinet officials who spoke at the university during a convocation that focused on the opioid epidemic.

In spring 2018, Liberty's Zaki Gordon Cinematic Arts Center co-produced a feature film called The Trump Prophecy. The film focuses on a retired firefighter from Florida who says God revealed to him in 2011 that Trump would one day be president. The film was shown in some cinemas in October 2018.

In 2019, The Wall Street Journal and Inside Higher Education reported that Liberty CIO John Gauger allegedly accepted cash, through his IT consulting firm unaffiliated with the school, to rig two online polls for Trump before he became a candidate.

== Controversies ==
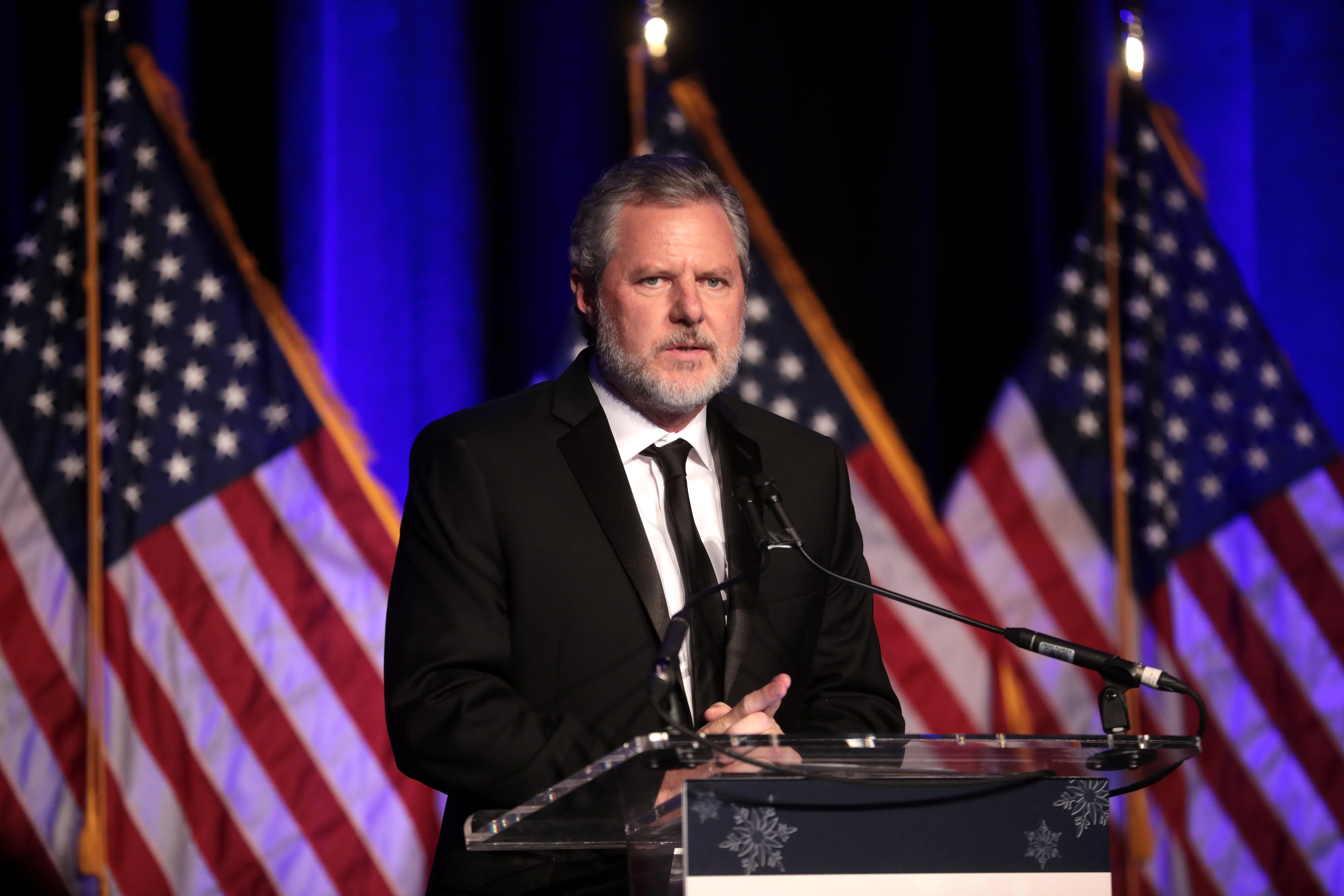
Jerry Falwell Jr.

=== Censorship ===
In October 2017, Christian writer Jonathan Martin was escorted off the campus by Liberty University Police Department officers, and threatened with arrest should he return, after announcing his intention to host a peaceful protest at Liberty. Liberty said in response that they do not allow uninvited protests on campus.

In 2018, an op-ed about Liberty's policy of forcing unwed mothers into Liberty's Godparents home was spiked by Liberty. The same year, when Liberty student journalist Erin Covey was writing a story about an off campus revival by Red Letter Christians, she approached Falwell for comment on the piece, to which Falwell responded "Let’s not run any articles about the event." As a result of these controversies, Covey and the editor-in-chief of the Champion were fired from their positions, and each lost a $3,000 per semester scholarship. The Champion was restructured afterwards to eliminate the editor-in-chief position.

In 2019, Will Young, a former editor of the Champion, recalled his experiences in a lengthy Washington Post article, describing Liberty as having a "culture of fear". In his first week in that role, he had been rebuked for attempting to get the campus's police blotter. He found that school officials often overrode student editors' decisions and imposed censorship, which was part of "an infrastructure of thought-control that Falwell and his lieutenants [had] introduced into every aspect of Liberty University life". Young noted that the school, "founded on principles of fundamental Christianity, is now a place that has zero tolerance for new questions and ideas. Those who harbor them must remain silent, or leave." He would also write that when he eventually resigned, the school did not appoint a new student editor, opting instead to turn the newspaper "into a faculty-run, student-written organ and seizing complete control of its content." Student journalists became so frustrated that they launched an independent newspaper, the Lynchburg Torch, to cover stories the administration tried to suppress. It operated from 2017 to 2019.

Young would later argue that Liberty had deeper issues than its censorship, and Liberty should address its racist past, beginning with Jerry Falwell Sr. and that it must include people of color and LGBTQ people as it makes decisions.

In 2019, this censorship and other factors led the Foundation for Individual Rights in Education to rank Liberty University among the worst universities in the U.S. terms of free speech. Falwell published an article detailing his disagreement with this distinction and rejecting the idea that Liberty regularly censored students.

=== Falwell Jr. scandals ===
In 2020, Falwell was accused of nepotism, racism, and alcohol use contravening Baptist teaching on teetotalism. During the summer of 2020 it was revealed that Falwell and his wife Becki were involved in a number of sex scandals. (Note: Attributed to multiple sources:) As a result, Falwell was placed on indefinite leave on August 7, 2020. A few weeks later, he resigned. (Note: Attributed to multiple sources:) He claimed at the time that he was entitled to $10.5 million in compensation from the university because he resigned without either admitting to wrongdoing or having formal accusations opened against him.

Following Falwell's resignation, Times Higher Education reported that Liberty University was "facing growing criticism over perceived resistance to diversity" following the departures of Edwards, board chair Allen McFarland, and pastor David Nasser. Jonathan Falwell, a son of Jerry Falwell Sr., and brother to Falwell Jr., replaced Nasser.

In late 2020, three reform efforts took place in the aftermath of Falwell's resignation. A group of Liberty University alumni called Save71 was organized in an effort to reform the school. Three Liberty University athletes, Kennedi Williams, Dee Brown, and TreShaun Clark, organized a Black Lives Matter protest on campus, drawing a crowd of about two hundred people. Student leaders also created an online petition to force Liberty to shut down the school's think tank, the Falkirk Center The petition garnered about 400 signatures, but was ultimately unsuccessful, as the Falkirk Center was turned into Liberty's Standing for Freedom Center.

In April 2021, the university sued Falwell for $40 million in damages for breach of contract and violation of fiduciary duty. In the same month, the Liberty University board of trustees replaced acting chairman Allen McFarland, the first African American board chair, with Tim Lee, a "pro-Trump pastor" and double amputee Vietnam veteran. According to Politico, McFarland had an interest in increasing tolerance and diversity at Liberty.

During the fall semester of 2024, Falwell's ban on attending on-campus events was rescinded, and he attended that year's homecoming game.

In May 2025, it was reported that Liberty had paid Falwell Jr. about $15 million to settle all litigation between Liberty and Falwell.

=== Mismanagement of sexual assault ===
In July 2021, the university was sued by twelve anonymous women, including two employees, who alleged that the university created an environment that increased the likelihood of sexual assault and rape in violation of federal Title IX law. The lawsuit alleged that the school's student honor code makes it difficult to report sexual violence because it does not clearly shield students; that the university had a tacit policy that condoned sexual violence, especially by male student athletes, by weighing a denial more heavily than an allegation; and that the school retaliates against women who report sexual violence. In one of the alleged incidents, a 15-year-old who was allegedly attacked by Jesse Matthew (Matthew later confessed to murdering Hannah Graham), was told she would be criminally charged with filing a false report, before they began an "investigation" into her claim. The investigation allegedly only consisted of a demand that she strip and submit to being photographed naked by the chief of police—which she refused to do. She later was not taken to the hospital but the police later pestered her until she agreed to be photographed naked by a female debate coach. In a written response to the lawsuit, Liberty University officials said "The allegations are deeply troubling, if they turn out to be true", and said that would look into each allegation detailed in the lawsuit. Ten of the women settled in a confidential agreement.

An October 2021, a ProPublica investigative report found that Liberty University discouraged and dismissed students coming forward about sexual assault; former students said they were threatened with punishment after coming forward with accusations of sexual assault. Multiple witnesses said school officials manipulated their statements in support of a sexual assault victims to undercut the victims' accounts, eventually expelling one such witness. Additionally, the school neglected to report every case to the Title IX office or to inform students of their option of reporting incidents to law enforcement. Sexual assault victims shared accounts of university staff erroneously telling them that speaking to law enforcement would compromise a Title IX investigation and of being made to sign documents agreeing not to report their sexual assault to the police. According to a Liberty alumna who spoke to ProPublica, after she reported her rape to the university's Title IX office, a school official listed the potential infractions she could be disciplined for in the incident, including having premarital sex. Politico also reported that a former Liberty University official, Scott Lamb, also accused Liberty University of violating its 501(c)(3) nonprofit status. Politico had previously reported that the school had invested in "Republican causes and efforts to promote the Trump administration". Lamb told ProPublica that he was fired on October 6, 2021, for telling school officials about staff members' failure to report sexual assaults appropriately. He characterized the tendency of university leaders to ignore sexual assault reports once they made their way up the chain of command as "a conspiracy of silence".

In fall 2023, a preliminary report by the U.S. Department of Education alleged that school officials had failed to report campus crime and safety statistics, had destroyed evidence of assaults, and had retaliated against at least one employee who raised concerns about violations of the Clery Act, the federal law that requires such disclosures by schools that receive federal funding. Crimes the report finds were covered up include sexual assault, stalking, and intimate partner violence. Specific acts by Liberty employees detailed in the report include tasking IT with wiping specific hard drives, failing to secure and potentially shredding incident reports, failing to log or follow up on a police report alleging a rape by an unnamed former university president, re-promoting an employee who was demoted after accusations of drugging and assaulting a colleague, and allowing a football player to remain on the team from 2018 to 2022 despite accusations of rape and of stalking a university employee during that time. The report states that the university's culture of "substantially and systematically underreported" crime statistics might trace back as far to 1992. Liberty faces a fine of up to $37.5 million for Clery Act violations. An alumna who says Liberty pressured her to retract a report of sexual assault told USA Today of potential fines, "A little fine is not going to make them change their ways. They can make back any amount of money with a snap of fingers".

In March 2024, Liberty University was fined $14 million for the Clery Act violations. As described by NPR, the investigators' final 105-page report documents "serious, persistent, and systemic violations" by officials who "discouraged students from reporting crimes, did not adequately respond to incidents of sexual violence, failed to tell the campus about criminal activities or dangerous situations (such as gas leaks), and did not maintain an accurate or complete list of crimes". Liberty was placed on Federal monitoring until April 2026.

== Notable alumni ==
Notable Liberty alumni include:

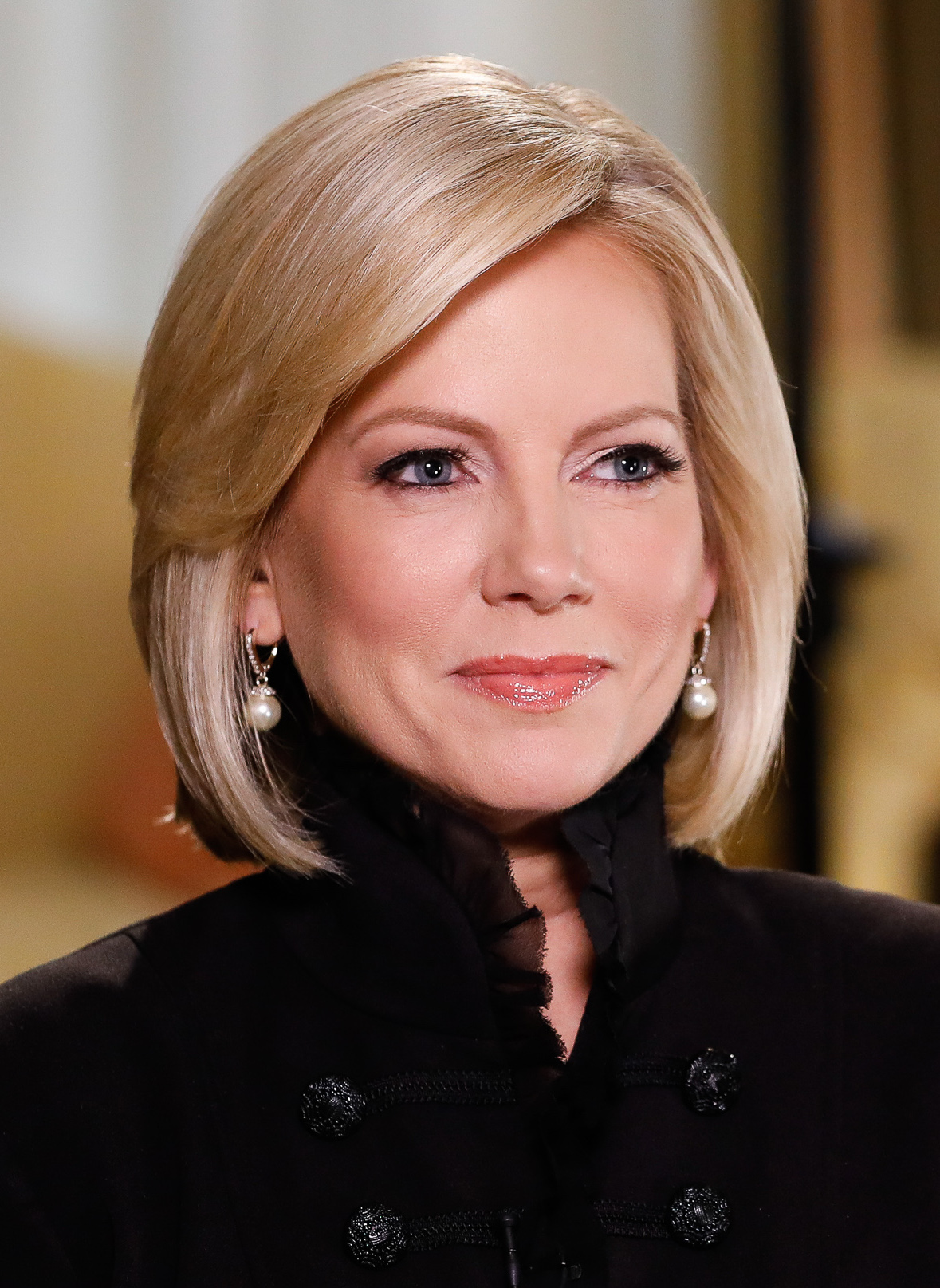
Shannon Bream
Fox News host

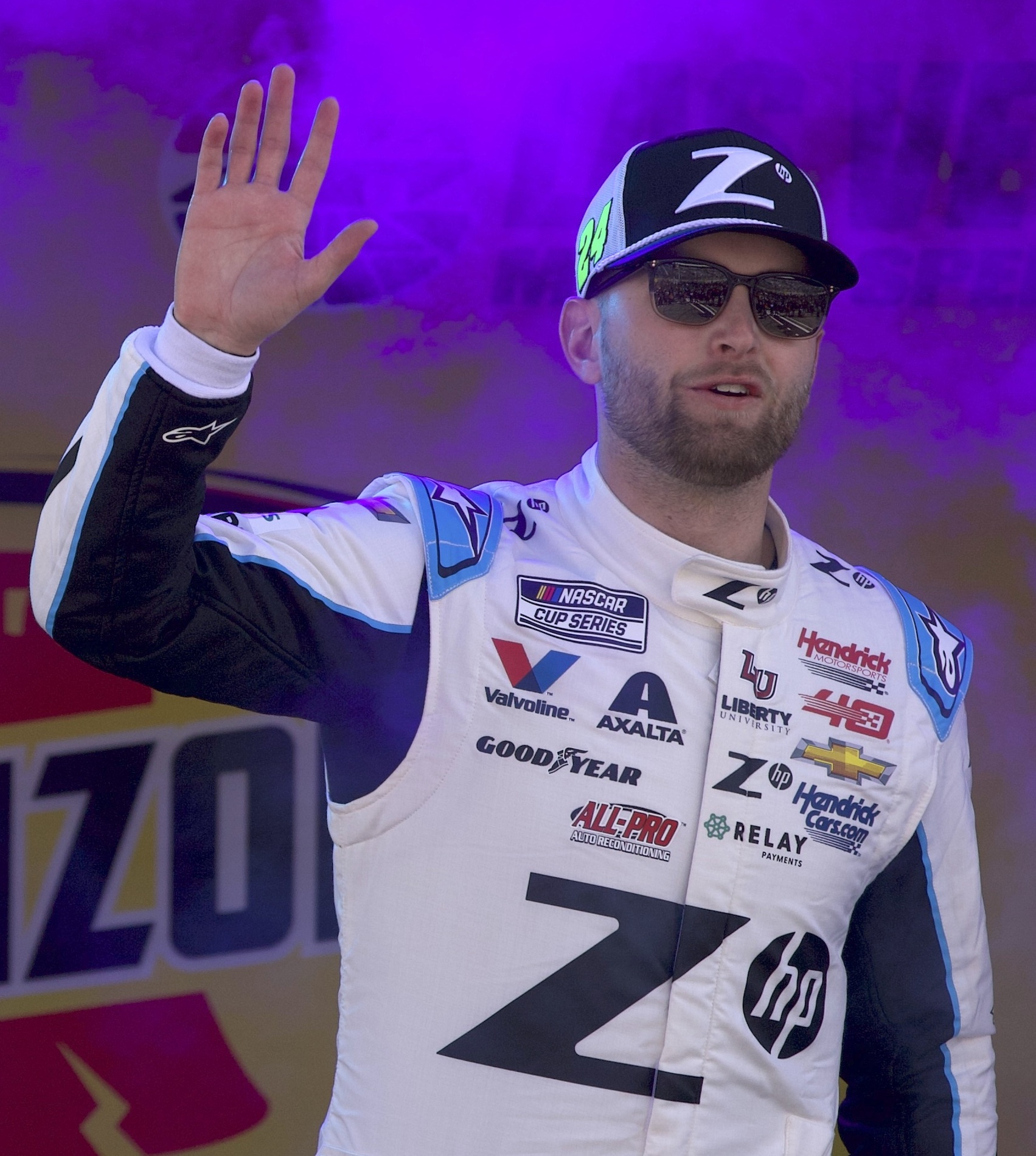
William Byron
NASCAR driver

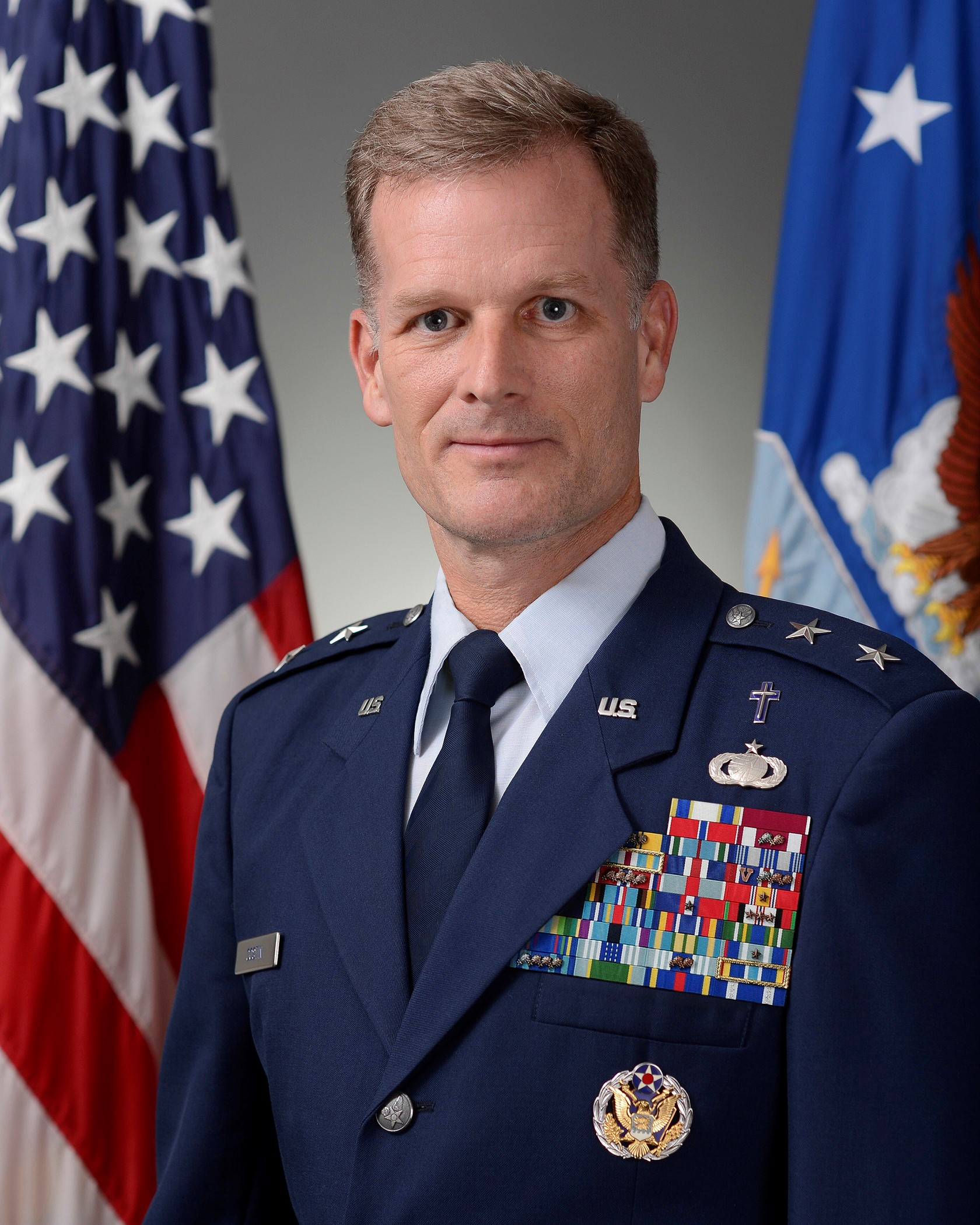
Dondi E. Costin
President of Liberty University

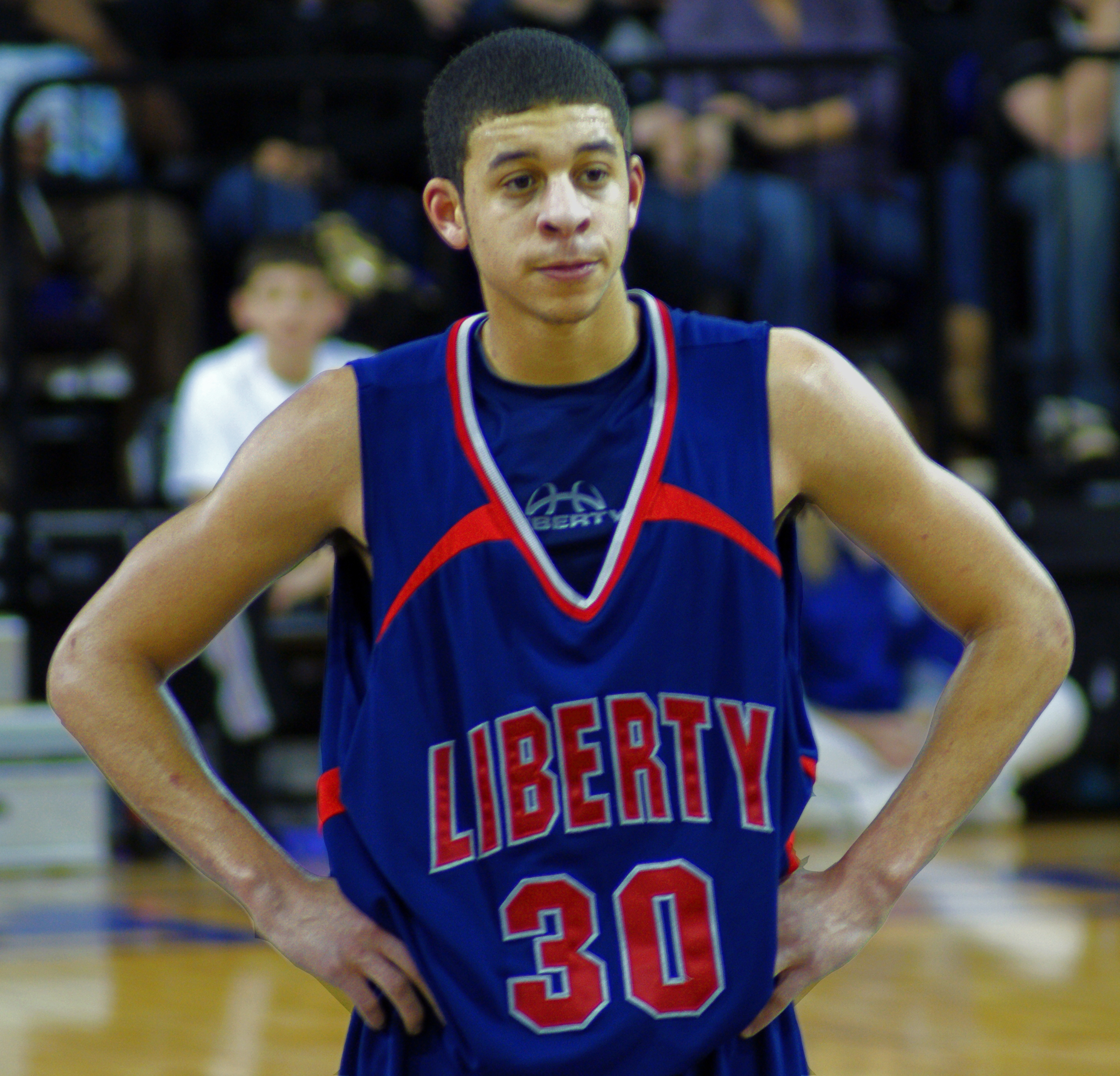
Seth Curry,
NBA guard

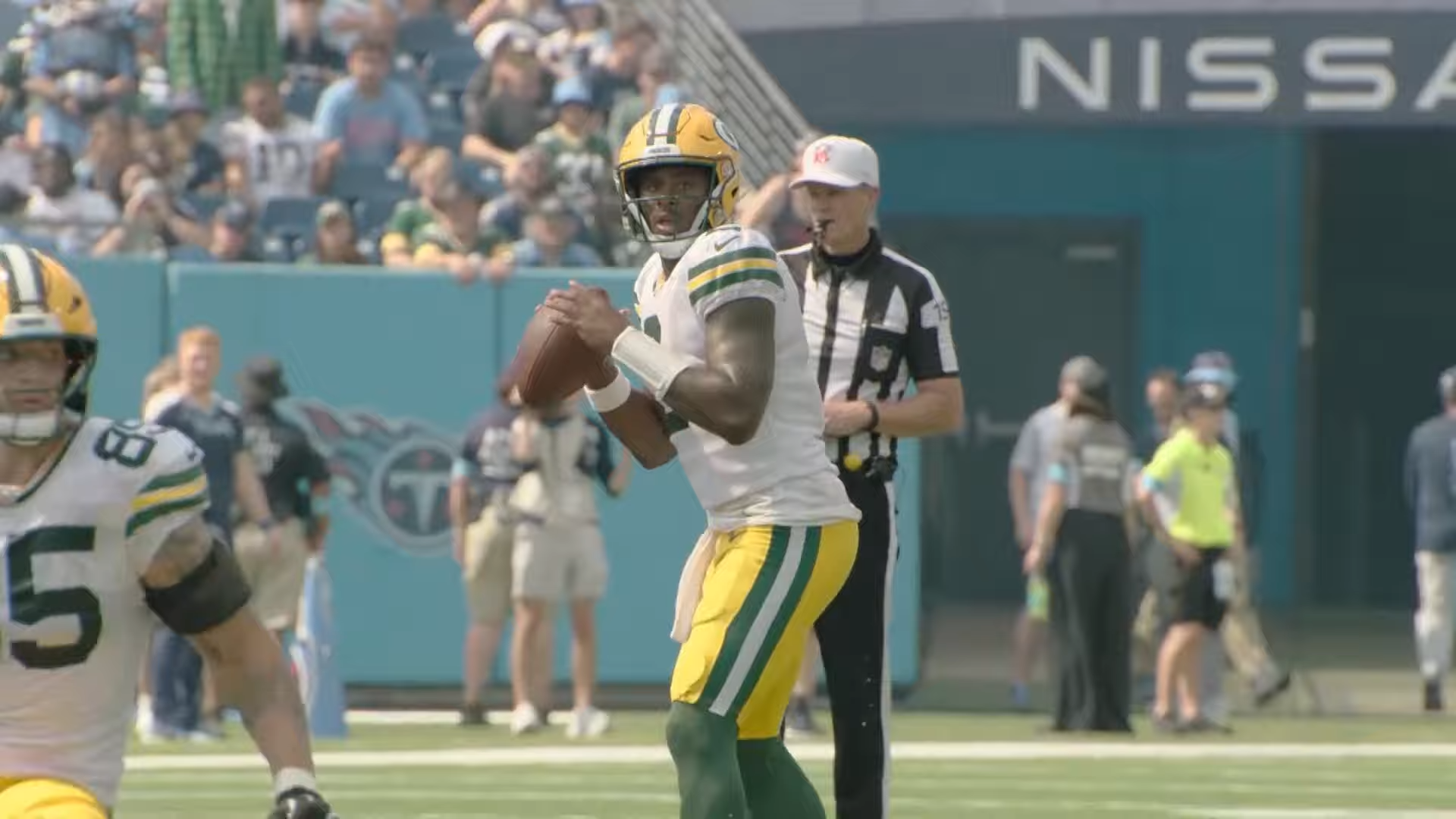
Malik Willis
NFL quarterback

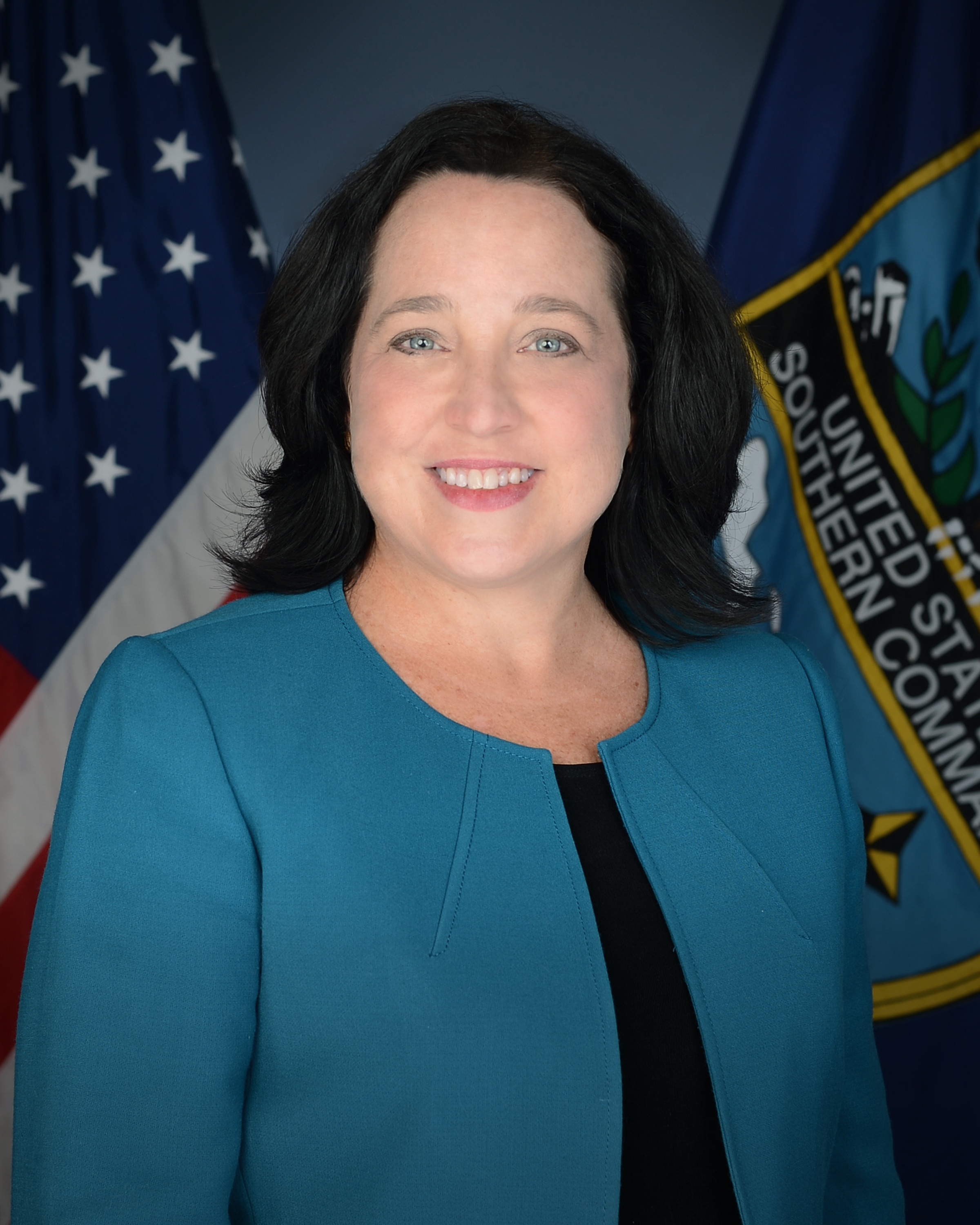
Jean Elizabeth Manes
United States Ambassador to El Salvador

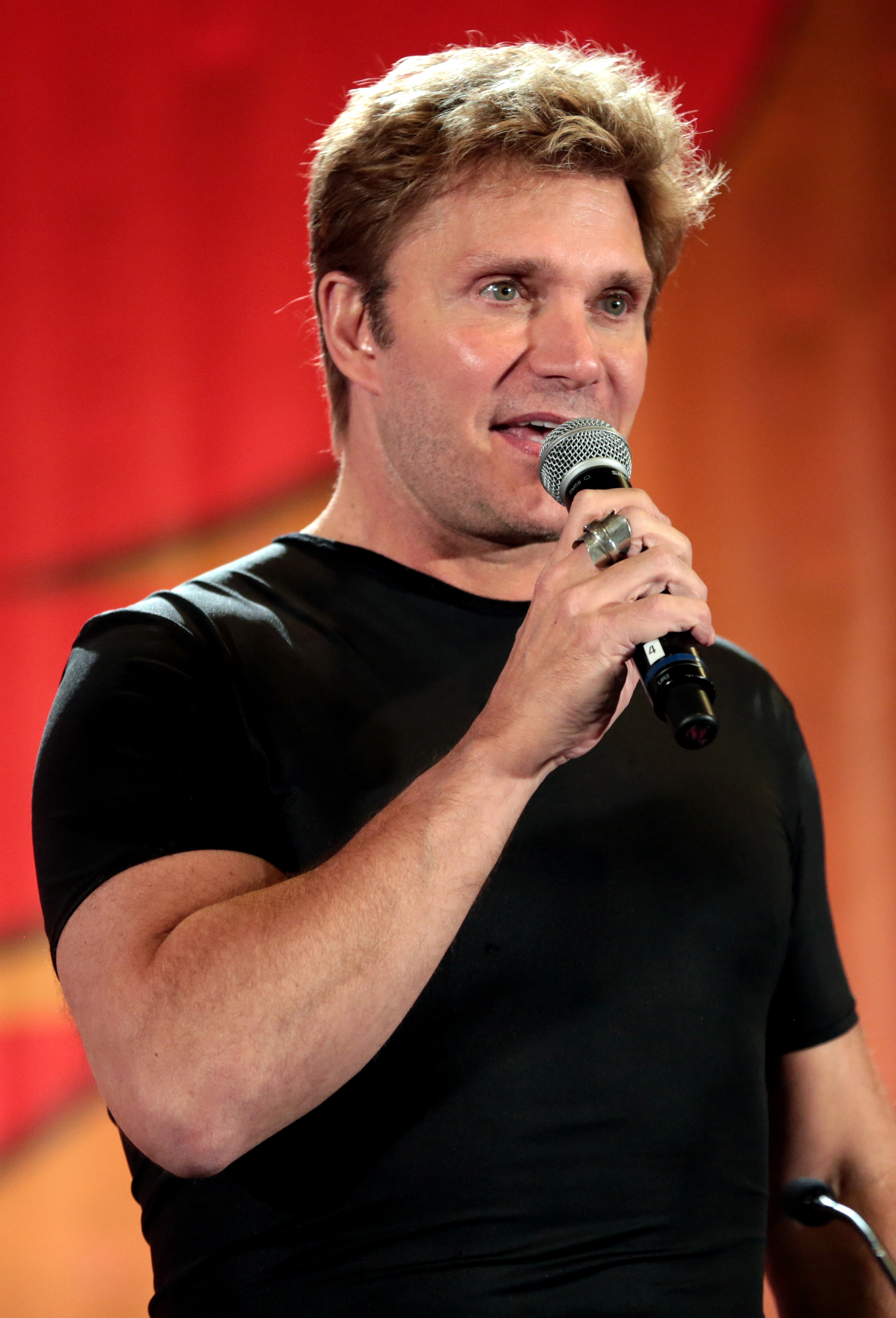
Vic Mignogna
Anime voice actor

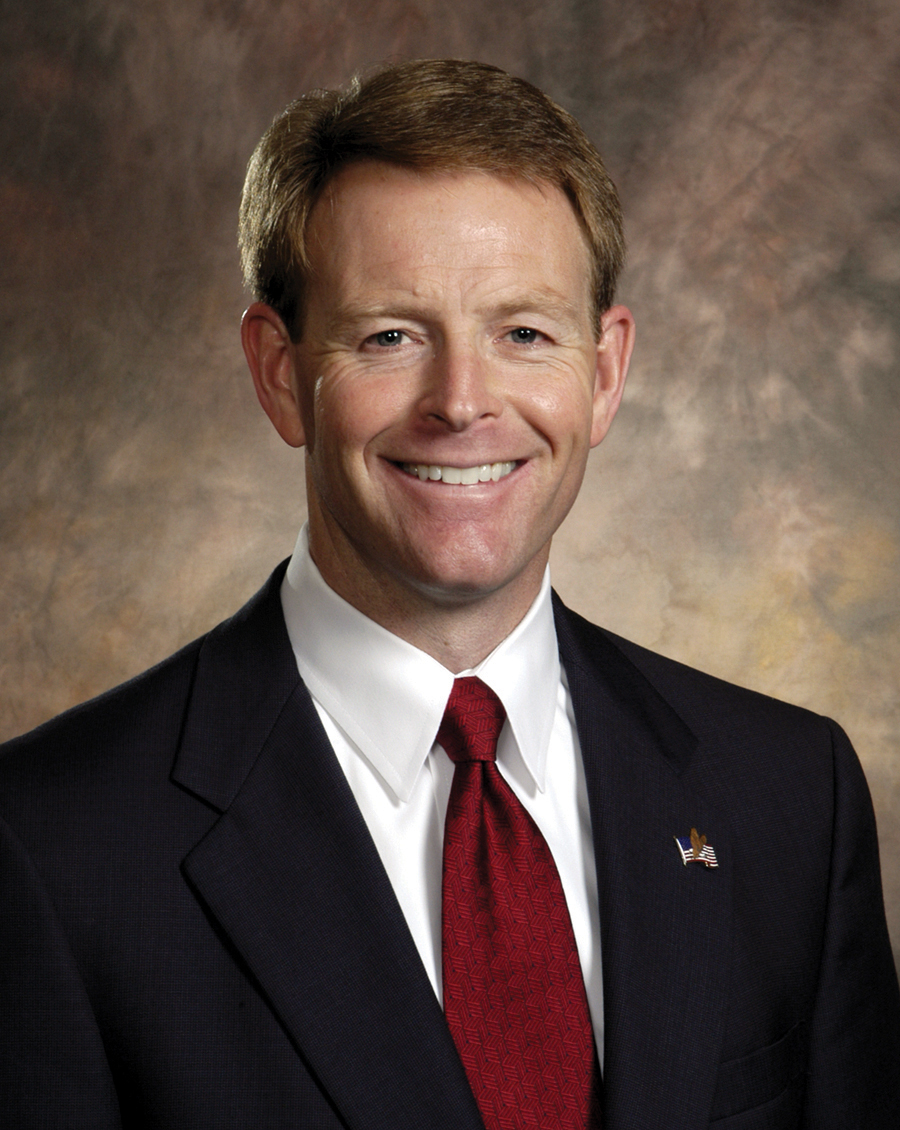
Tony Perkins
President of the Family Research Council

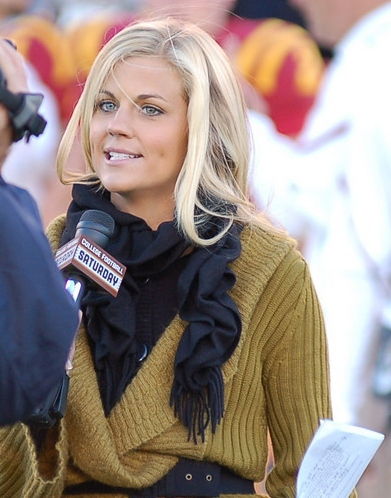
Samantha Ponder
Sportscaster

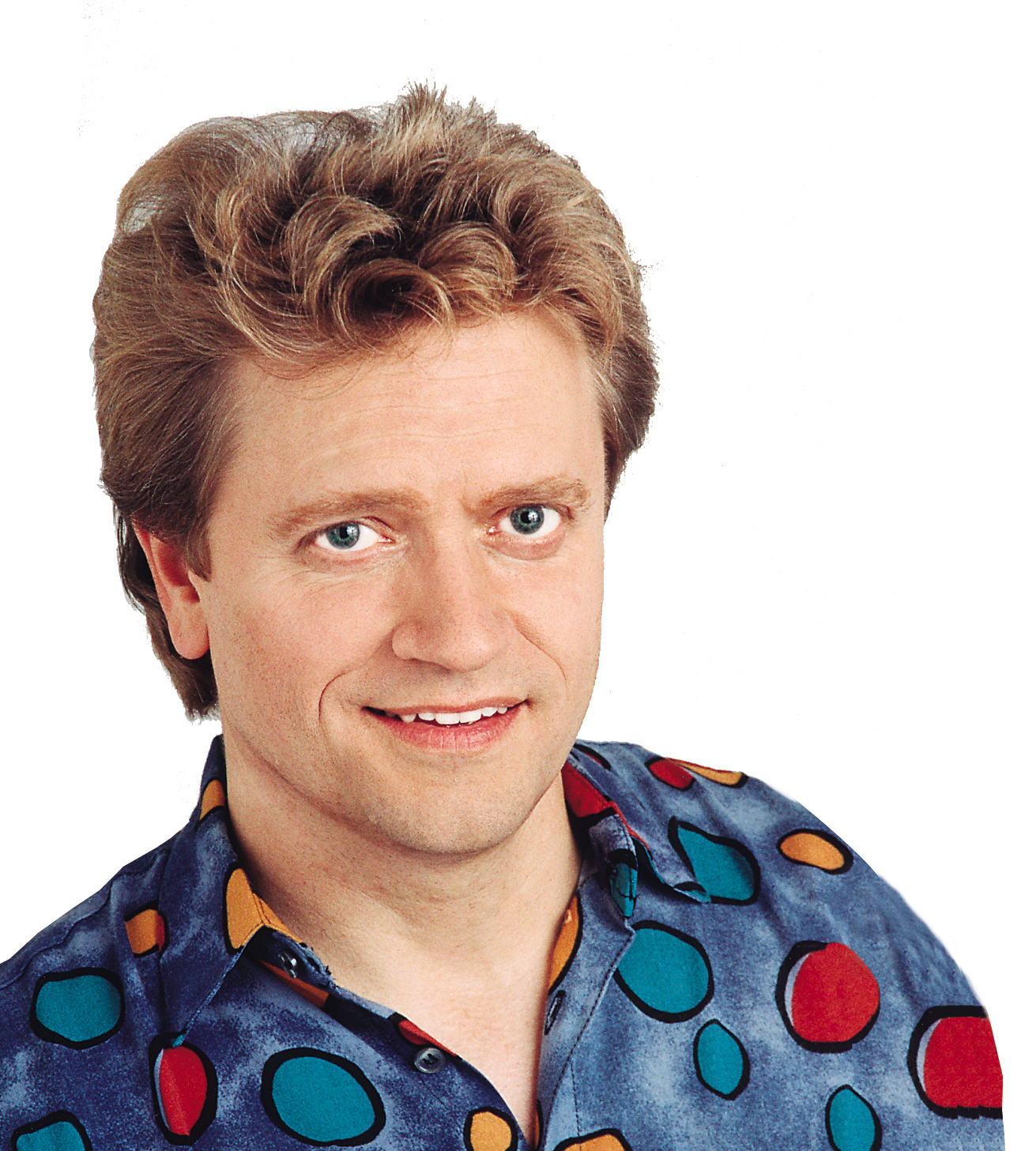
Phil Snyder
Animated voice actor and comedian
