= Liberty University College of Osteopathic Medicine =

Osteopathic medical school of Liberty University

- Type: Private medical school Non-profit
- Established: 2014
- Affiliations: Liberty University
- Dean: Joseph R. Johnson, DO
- Location: Lynchburg, Virginia, USA
- Nickname: LUCOM
- Website: www.liberty.edu/lucom/

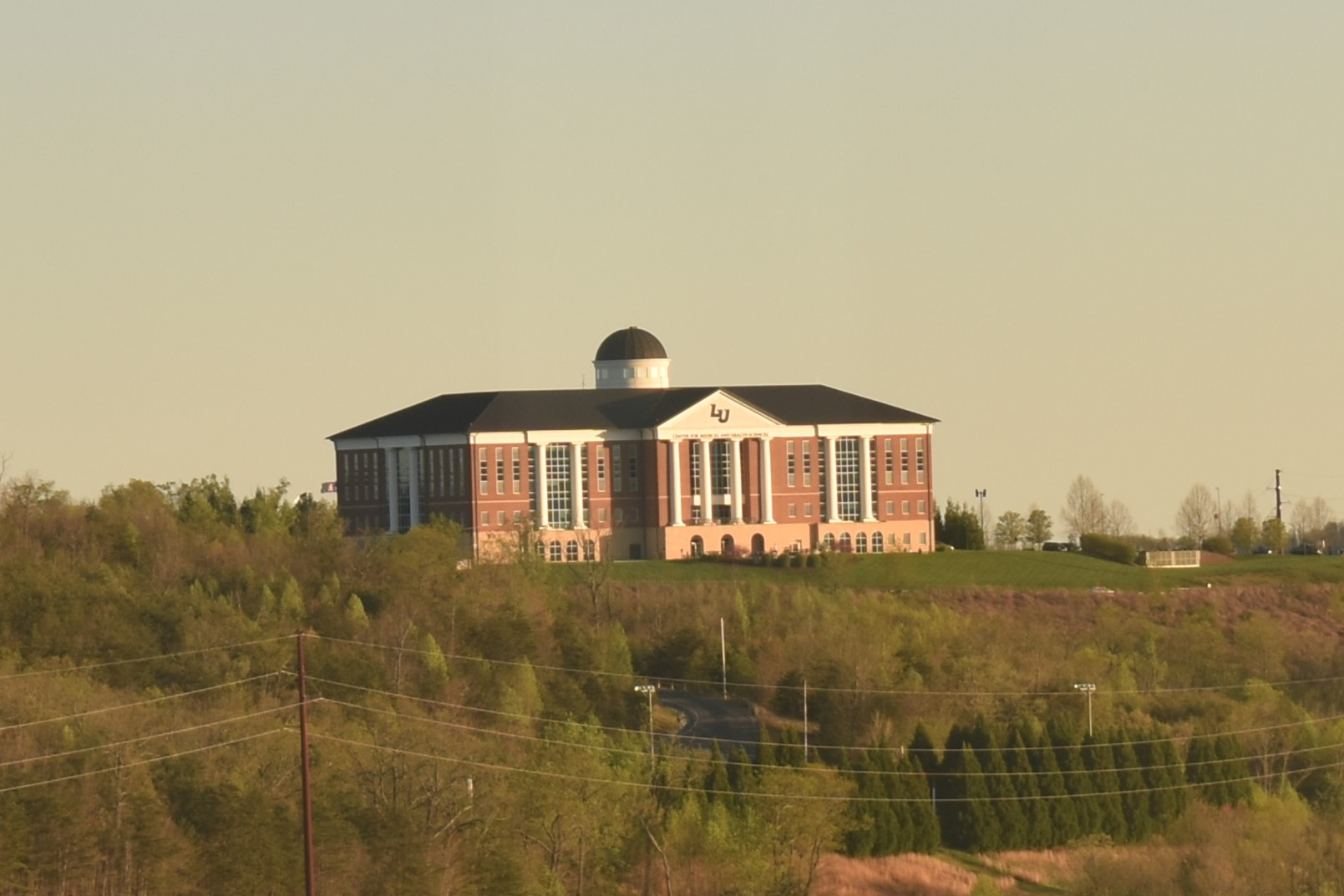
Liberty University's College of Osteopathic Medicine

Liberty University College of Osteopathic Medicine (LUCOM) is a private graduate medical school located in Lynchburg, Virginia. It is one of the seventeen colleges and schools located in Liberty University. LUCOM was the second osteopathic medical school to open in the U.S. state of Virginia after the Edward Via College of Osteopathic Medicine. In 2018, the inaugural class of 126 medical students graduated.

== History ==
In August 2014, Liberty University opened the College of Osteopathic Medicine. The college is housed in a 144,000-square-foot, $40 million building and was completed in 2014.

The college received provisional accreditation from the American Osteopathic Association through the American Osteopathic Association Commission on Osteopathic College Accreditation in 2013 and received full accreditation in 2018. The college secured long-term affiliations with Halifax Health, the Johnson Health Center, LifePoint, and a thirty-year clinical clerkship and graduate medical education affiliation with Centra Health that including a commitment of clinical rotations for eighty students per year.

In July 2015, the College of Osteopathic Medicine opened Liberty Mountain Medical Group LLC, a primary care clinic serving the greater Lynchburg area. Services include family medicine, internal medicine, pediatrics, and sports medicine, and will have a laboratory and X-ray imaging available.

== Leadership ==
2012–2016, founding Dean Ronnie Martin, D.O.

2016–2017, Interim Dean David Klink, D.O.

2017–2020, Dean Peter Alan Bell, D.O., MBA

2021–present, Dean Joseph Johnson, D.O.

== See also ==
- List of medical schools in the United States
