= University of New England College of Osteopathic Medicine =

Private medical school in Portland, Maine, US

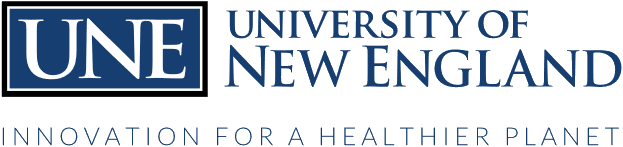
- Motto: "Lucens et Ardens"
- Motto in English: "Ardor for Light"
- Type: Private medical school
- Established: 1978
- Parent institution: University of New England
- Budget: $35.42 million
- President: James D. Herbert, Ph.D.
- Provost: Michael R. Sheldon, Ph.D.
- Dean: Jane E. Carreiro, D.O.
- Faculty: 250
- Students: 500
- Location: Portland, Maine, United States; 43°41′06″N 70°17′45″W
- Campus: Suburban
- Website: www.une.edu/com

The University of New England College of Osteopathic Medicine (UNE COM) is a private medical school in Portland, Maine. Founded in 1978, the college is part of the University of New England and grants two degrees: the Doctor of Osteopathic Medicine (D.O.) degree and a Master of Medical Education Leadership. According to U.S. News & World Report, UNE COM graduates the 6th most physicians of any U.S. medical school that go on to practice in a primary care specialty.

UNE COM is accredited by the Commission on Osteopathic College Accreditation (COCA) and by the Commission on Institutions of Higher Education of the New England Commission of Higher Education.

== History ==
The college was founded in 1978 by the New England Osteopathic Foundation. The following year, 1979, the New England College of Osteopathic Medicine merged with St. Francis College to create the University of New England. The medical school was originally housed in Stella Maris Hall, but in 1996, with the opening of Harold Alfond Center for Health Sciences the majority of classwork for the first and second years were transferred to the Alfond Center while Administration and Faculty Offices continued to be housed in Stella Marris Hall. In August 2013, UNE COM opened Leonard Hall, a new classroom space for first and second year medical courses.

In 1996, the University of New England merged with Westbrook College. The campus of the former Westbrook College is now known as the UNE Portland Campus, and it houses UNE's Westbrook College of Health Professions, College of Pharmacy, and College of Dental Medicine. UNE has now become one of a handful of private universities with a comprehensive health education mission including medicine, pharmacy, dental medicine, nursing and an array of allied health professions.

In 2025, UNE opened a new 110,000 square-foot medical education facility on the school's Portland campus. The facility is named the Harold and Bibby Alfond Center for Health Sciences, after a $30 million gift from the Alfond Foundation for the center.

== Mission ==
To educate "health care leaders who advance patient-centered, high-quality osteopathic primary care, research and community health for the people of Maine, New England, and the nation."

== Academics ==
The first and second years of the DO program consist of the basic sciences, along with structured, standardized patient encounters, while the third and fourth years consist of clinical clerkships in hospitals and clinics throughout New England and the Mid-Atlantic States.

Each third year student is required to complete 6-week rotations in Family Medicine, Obstetrics & Gynecology, Psychiatry, Surgery, and Pediatrics, as well as a 12-week rotation in Internal Medicine. Fourth year students are required to complete 4-week clerkships in emergency medicine, osteopathic manipulative medicine, a surgical subspecialty, a subspecialty of pediatrics or internal medicine, and rural health, through Maine's AHEC program. Students are then free to complete 19 weeks of electives in any specialty they want. Students are free to do all of their fourth year rotations throughout the United States.

In addition to the DO degree, students at UNE COM may complete Masters in Public Health or a Master of Science in Medical Education Leadership (MMEL). The college also offers fellowships in anatomy and osteopathic manipulative medicine.

== Notable alumni ==
- Peter Alan Bell, Vice Provost and Dean at Baptist Health Sciences University

== See also ==
- List of medical schools in the United States
