= Peter Alan Bell =

American physician

Peter Alan Bell DO
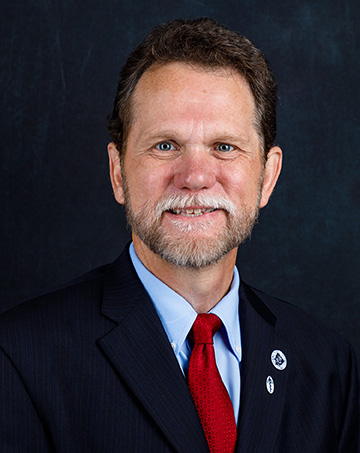
- Peter A. Bell, pictured at Liberty University College of Osteopathic Medicine (LUCOM).
- Born: January 21, 1958 (age 68); Abington, Pennsylvania, U.S.
- Education: Hamilton College; New England College of Osteopathic Medicine
- Occupations: Physician, Dean of Medicine, Vice Provost
- Employer: Baptist College of Health Sciences
- Children: Peter Alan Bell II

Peter Alan Bell (born Jan. 21, 1958) is an American osteopathic physician. He is the current Vice Provost and Dean at Baptist College of Health Sciences, now known as Baptist Health Sciences University in Memphis, TN. Additionally, Bell is nationally known for his continued work on health policy reform and the impact of health policy on the medical profession. Finally, Bell has served as president of the Ohio Osteopathic Association (OOA) and the National President of The American College of Osteopathic Emergency Physicians (ACOEP).

== Education ==
Bell was born in Abington, Pennsylvania, in 1958, to Clyde H. Bell and Dorothy B. Bell. His family moved to Penfield, New York, where he was a resident until his graduation from high school in 1976. After obtaining an undergraduate degree at Hamilton College in 1980, he then attended the University of New England College of Osteopathic Medicine, where he obtained his Doctor of Osteopathic Medicine (D.O.) degree in 1984. Post-graduation, Bell completed a traditional internship and a residency in family medicine, at the Metropolitan Hospital/Parkview, in Philadelphia, Pennsylvania. He then completed a second residency in emergency medicine at Grandview Hospital and Medical Center, located Dayton, Ohio. In 2008, Bell graduated first in his class from Ohio University's Executive Masters in Business Program.

== Career ==
In 1988, Bell became the emergency department medical director at OhioHealth Doctors Hospital in Columbus, Ohio. In 1991, he founded the emergency medicine residency program at Doctors Hospital and since then has helped establish emergency medicine programs in other midwestern states. Ohio University College of Medicine (now the Ohio University Heritage College of Osteopathic Medicine- OUHCOM) hired Bell as a regional dean in 1995 under Barbara Ross-Lee, DO.

In 2014, OUHCOM expanded and opened two more campuses at OhioHealth in Dublin, Ohio, and at Cleveland Clinic. Bell was a key member in the creation and opening of the medical schools.

Bell graduated in 2000 from the American Osteopathic Association (AOA) National Health Policy Fellowship and was chairman of the OOA’s Health Policy Committee from 2002 to 2017. His focus has always been on cost, quality, and access to care as well as tort reform.

From 1995–2004, Bell was editor-in-chief of the American College of Osteopathic Emergency Medicine Newsletter, The Pulse. He is also on the Western Journal of Emergency Medicine Advisory Board from (2011–present) and joined the editorial board in 2013.

Bell has participated in Grants and Research involving more than $100 million. He has published dozens of papers and editorials, led the development and implementation of hundreds of scholarly projects, and regularly presents at national and international forums.

In 2012, Bell received the Lifetime Achievement Award from the American College of Osteopathic Emergency Physicians.

In 2017, Bell was appointed dean of Liberty University College of Osteopathic Medicine (LUCOM). Bell orchestrated the accreditation of the new medical school. Liberty University College of Osteopathic Medicine graduated its first class in May 2018. To celebrate this achievement, Dr. Ben Carson was invited to the graduation as the keynote speaker. Bell left Liberty University in December 2020.

In September 2020, Bell earned Emeritus Status from the Ohio University Board of Trustees.

In 2022, Bell was awarded the highest honor from the American Osteopathic Association for his service to the discipline. In addition to his work at Baptist Health Sciences University, Bell continues to serve as a faculty member for Doctors Hospital Emergency Medicine Residency.

== Baptist Health Sciences University College of Osteopathic Medicine ==
In 2021, Bell was hired to develop a new College of Osteopathic Medicine in Memphis, Tennessee. In October 2022, the college was granted candidacy status by the Commission on Osteopathic College Accreditation (COCA). In April 2023, the college received pre-accreditation status from COCA. The first class matriculated in July 2024.
