= Liberty School =

Liberty School may refer to:

- Liberty School (Blue Hill, Maine)
- Liberty School No. 4, Friendship Building, Pittsburgh, Pennsylvania
- The Liberty School, a school in Shadyside, Pittsburgh, Pennsylvania
- Liberty Colored High School Liberty, South Carolina
- Liberty School (Brentwood, Tennessee)

== See also ==
- Liberty Hill School (disambiguation)
- Liberty High School (disambiguation)
- Liberty Middle School (disambiguation)
- Liberty School Cafeteria, Hamlet, Arkansas
- New Liberty School (disambiguation)
