= Liberty High School =

Liberty High School may refer to the following schools in the United States:

== Arizona ==
- Liberty High School (Globe, Arizona)
- Liberty High School (Peoria, Arizona)

== California ==
- Liberty High School (Bakersfield, California)
- Liberty High School (Benicia, California), Benicia, California
- Liberty High School (Brentwood, California)
- Liberty High School (Madera Ranchos, California); see California HeatWave

== Colorado ==
- Liberty High School (Colorado), in Colorado Springs

== Florida ==
- Liberty High School (Kissimmee, Florida)
- Liberty High School (Palm Bay, Florida), Palm Bay, Florida

== Georgia ==
- Liberty County High School (Georgia) in Hinesville, Georgia

== Illinois ==
- Liberty High School (Illinois), in Liberty

== Iowa ==
- Liberty High School (Iowa), in North Liberty

== Louisiana ==
- Liberty High School (Baton Rouge, Louisiana)

== Maryland ==
- Liberty High School (Maryland), in Carroll County

== Missouri ==
- Liberty High School (Liberty, Missouri)
- Liberty North High School, Liberty, Missouri
- Liberty High School (Lake St. Louis, Missouri)

== Nevada ==
- Liberty High School (Nevada), in Henderson

== New Jersey ==
- Liberty High School (New Jersey), in Jersey City

== New York ==
- Liberty High School (Liberty, New York)
- Liberty High School Academy for Newcomers, a high school in New York City

== Ohio ==
- Liberty Union High School, Baltimore
- Liberty-Benton High School, Findlay
- Olentangy Liberty High School, Powell
- Liberty High School, Youngstown

== Oregon ==
- Liberty High School (Oregon)

== Pennsylvania ==
- Liberty High School (Bethlehem, Pennsylvania)
- North Penn-Liberty High School, in Liberty

== South Carolina ==
- Liberty High School (South Carolina), in Liberty, South Carolina

== Texas ==
- Liberty High School (Frisco, Texas), Dallas/Fort Worth area
- Liberty High School (Houston, Texas)
- Liberty High School (Liberty, Texas), Houston metropolitan area

== Virginia ==
- Liberty High School (Bealeton, Virginia)
- Liberty High School (Bedford, Virginia)
- The high school at Liberty Christian Academy in Lynchburg

== Washington ==
- Liberty High School (Washington), in Issaquah
- Liberty High School (Spangle, Washington)

== West Virginia ==
- Liberty High School (Clarksburg, West Virginia)
- Liberty High School (Glen Daniel, West Virginia)

== See also ==
- Liberty Colored High School, Liberty, South Carolina
- Liberty County High School (Georgia)
- Liberty County High School (Florida)
- Liberty School (disambiguation)
