= The Old-Time Gospel Hour =

American television series

- Presented by: Jerry Falwell
- Country of origin: United States
- Original language: English

Production
- Production location: Lynchburg, Virginia
- Running time: 59 minutes
- Production company: Thomas Road Baptist Church

Original release
- Release: 1956 – 2007

The Old-Time Gospel Hour was a ministry radio and television program broadcast from Thomas Road Baptist Church hosted by minister Jerry Falwell featuring the church's Sunday service. Started in 1956 by Jerry Falwell, The Old-Time Gospel Hour gained a national following on radio and television. The series was a major revenue source for Falwell, bringing in more than $90 million during the early 1980s. The show's popularity continued through the 1990s, during which time it was still broadcast on hundreds of stations across the country.

The television show ended after Falwell died in 2007. His son, Jonathan Falwell, became the primary minister featured in the Sunday services and eventually folded the show into the church's online video library and livestream website called Thomas Road On Demand.

== In popular culture ==
Bono of the band U2 mentions The Old-Time Gospel Hour in the 1988 live version of the song "Bullet the Blue Sky" on the album Rattle and Hum. Toward the end of the song, there is a spoken section where he says "...and I can't tell the difference between ABC News, Hill Street Blues, and a preacher on the Old-Time Gospel Hour stealing money from the sick and the old. Well, the God I believe in isn't short of cash, mister."
