= Elmer L. Towns =

American Christian academic, pastor and writer

- Born: October 21, 1932 (age 93); Savannah, Georgia, U.S.
- Education: Northwestern College (BA); Dallas Theological Seminary (MTh); Southern Methodist University (MA); Garrett Theological Seminary (MRE); Fuller Theological Seminary (DMin)
- Occupations: Academic; pastor; professor; author

Elmer Leon Towns Jr. (born October 21, 1932) is an American Christian academic, pastor and writer who co-founded Liberty University alongside Jerry Falwell in 1971. He is a speaker on the principles of church growth, church leadership, Christian education, Sunday school, prayer and fasting.

Towns has been Dean of the B. R. Lakin School of Religion, Dean of Liberty University Baptist Theological Seminary, and Distinguished Professor of Systematic Theology at Liberty University. In fall 2013, Towns announced he would be taking a sabbatical from his teaching and administrative duties to focus on speaking and writing.

== Early life and education ==
Elmer Leon Towns Jr. was born on October 21, 1932, to Elmer Leon Towns Sr., and Erin McFaddin Towns in Savannah, Georgia, the oldest of three children. The senior Towns was a clerk at a local hardware store and an alcoholic, which contributed to his death. Towns Jr. frequently attended Eastern Heights Presbyterian Church as a teenager, though he believes his real conversion to Christianity came in 1950, following an evangelistic meeting earlier in the evening.

Towns attended Columbia Bible College for three years (1950–1953) before transferring during his senior year to Northwestern College in Minneapolis, Minnesota, and completing his Bachelor of Arts degree. He married Ruth Jean Forbes in 1953. He then attended Dallas Theological Seminary in pursuit of a Master of Theology degree. While in that program, Towns also enrolled in Southern Methodist University to study for a Master of Arts degree in Education. He received both master's degrees in 1958.

Towns acquired a teaching post at Trinity Evangelical Divinity School and moved to Deerfield, Illinois, where he earned his Master of Religious Education from the nearby Garrett–Evangelical Theological Seminary in 1967. Following an extended break from being a student, he attended Fuller Theological Seminary and received a Doctor of Ministry degree in 1983.

== Ministry and influence on the Christian church ==
Towns began his work in ministry at the age of 19, when he re-opened Westminster Presbyterian Church in Savannah, Georgia, in 1952. Towns commuted to Savannah to serve as pastor of the church during his junior year at Columbia Bible College, and the congregation grew to over 100 attendees under his leadership.

While attending graduate school at Dallas Theological Seminary, Towns attended and later joined the First Baptist Church of Dallas. Towns's affiliation with First Baptist Church was the catalyst for his career-spanning interest in church growth and promotion of large, vibrant congregations. First Baptist Church also introduced Towns to the importance of Sunday school as an education and retention tool within the Church. Also during his time in Dallas, Towns taught philosophy at Dallas Bible College, and was education director for Southwest Baptist Tabernacle and pastor of Faith Bible Church.

Following graduation from Dallas Theological Seminary, Towns accepted an assistant professorship in Christian Education at Midwest Bible College in St. Louis, Missouri. Towns was instrumental in helping the college achieve accreditation, and the experience earned him a place on the Accrediting Association of Bible Colleges (AABC). Towns's involvement with AABC led to his selection in 1961 as president of Winnipeg Bible Institute and College of Theology in Winnipeg, Manitoba, Canada (now Providence University College and Theological Seminary). During his tenure the college became accredited, doubled enrollment, and increased fundraising efforts.

In 1965, Towns became Associate Professor of Christian Education at Trinity Evangelical Divinity School in Deerfield, Illinois. A year later he became the Sunday School editor of Christian Life magazine, a position he held for 22 years. Both of these appointments corresponded with a remarkable increase in published works from him.< Both posts also provided Towns with an environment for gathering and analyzing data on Sunday schools, Christian education, and church growth through the use of yearly surveys, interviews, and church attendance records. This combination of sociology and ministry to create models for church growth was unique. Towns used the editorial appointment to communicate to a national audience through articles and books his vision for effective Sunday school teaching and church growth, eventually becoming a leading figure in the field of Christian education. It was during this period that Towns released his first research compilation in the ground-breaking bestselling book The Ten Largest Sunday Schools and What Made Them Grow. The reception for this book was so overwhelming that Towns used his position at Christian Life to publish the list "The 100 largest Sunday Schools" annually for ten years. Also during this period he became an advisory board member for the Evangelical Teacher Training Association and wrote a textbook and two teacher manuals.\

== Liberty University ==
In 1970, Jerry Falwell, then pastor of Thomas Road Baptist Church, began a fund-raising campaign to create an institute of higher learning and started researching candidates to help lead the school. Falwell and Towns had met previously during the preparation for The Ten Largest Sunday Schools and What Made Them Grow, as Thomas Road Baptist Church was number nine on the list. Towns's academic work in Christian education and previous experiences with the college accreditation process made him a strong candidate. In 1971, Falwell and Towns co-founded Lynchburg Baptist College in Lynchburg, Virginia (now Liberty University), with Falwell in an executive and fund-raising role and Towns as academic director and the school's only full-time instructor. In 1973, Towns left Lynchburg Baptist College on sabbatical and became a consultant for the consolidation of seven small Bible colleges into Baptist University of America, in Atlanta, Georgia. He then served as vice-president and academic dean. In 1977, Towns returned to Lynchburg Baptist College, which had been renamed Liberty Baptist College the previous year as editor-in-chief of all publications. During this time, Towns was editor of Faith Aflame, and started and edited Fundamentalist Journal and The Journal Champion (later renamed the Moral Majority Report). He was named dean of the seminary in 1979, and two years later, dean of the B.R. Lakin School of Religion. Under his leadership, the School of Religion received accreditation in 1984 and started a doctoral program in 1987. During Towns' academic career, he has given theological lectures and seminars at over 111 theological seminaries and colleges worldwide. He holds visiting professorship rank in five seminaries and has received six honorary doctoral degrees. He has published over 2,000 reference and/or popular articles. Five doctoral dissertations have analyzed his contribution to religious education and evangelism.

=== Church Growth Institute ===
In 1983, Towns joined with Larry Gilbert to found the Church Growth Institute, Inc., for the purpose of creating and distributing educational content and seminars for both pastors and laymen on the subject of church growth in local congregations. A popular seminar on Sunday school revitalization was attended by over 60,000 people in the first five years it was offered. The most recognizable contribution by the Institute to the ministry community was the creation of the Friend Day program, in which congregation members were encouraged to invite non-believing acquaintances to a special seeker-friendly service at a local church. Over 15,000 churches participated in the first Friend Day, and it became a perennial event in many churches over the next decade. Towns continues to be active in this ministry, producing resource packets and education material.

== Awards and acknowledgments ==
In 1995 Towns's book The Names of the Holy Spirit received the Gold Medallion Award for Book of the Year by the Christian Booksellers Association. In 2009 Towns was awarded the Bronze Telly Award for Through the Decades.

== Selected bibliography ==
- Teaching Teens. Winnipeg, Canada: Winnipeg Bible Institute Press, 1963.
- Successful Youth Work. Glendale, California: Gospel Light Publications, 1966.
- The Single Adult and the Church. Glendale, California: Regal Books, 1967.
- The Bright Future of Sunday School. Minneapolis, Minnesota: Free Church Publications, 1969.
- The Ten Largest Sunday Schools and What Makes Them Grow. Grand Rapids, Michigan: Baker Book House, 1969.
- Evangelize Through Christian Education. Wheaton, Illinois: Evangelical Teacher Training Association, 1970.
- Church Aflame. Nashville, Tennessee: Impact Books, 1971 (with Jerry Falwell).
- Successful Church Libraries. Grand Rapids, Michigan: Baker Book House, 1971 (with Cyril J. Barber).
- Team Teaching with Success. Cincinnati, Ohio: Standard Publishing, 1971.
- The Christian Hall of Fame. Grand Rapids, Michigan: Baker Book House, 1971.
- America’s Fastest Growing Churches. Nashville, Tennessee: Impact Books, 1972.
- Ministering to the Young Adult. Grand Rapids, Michigan: Baker Book House, 1972.
- Capturing a Town for Christ. Old Tappan, New Jersey: Fleming H. Revell Company, 1973 (with Jerry Falwell).
- Great Soul-Winning Churches. Murfreesboro, Tennessee: Sword of the Lord Publishers, 1973.
- Is the Day of the Denomination Dead? Nashville, Tennessee: Thomas Nelson, Inc., 1973.
- Successful Biblical Youth Work. Nashville, Tennessee: Impact Books, 1973.
- Christian Journalism. Gainesville, Florida: Genesis, Inc., 1974 (with Marie Chapman).
- Have the Public Schools “Had It”? Nashville, Tennessee: Thomas Nelson, Inc., 1974.
- World’s Largest Sunday School. Nashville, Tennessee: Thomas Nelson, Inc., 1974.
- A History of Religious Educators. Grand Rapids, Michigan: Baker Book House, 1975 (Editor).
- Getting a Church Started in the Face of Insurmountable Odds with Limited Resources in Unlikely Circumstances. Nashville, Tennessee: Impact Books, 1975.
- A Fresh Start in Life Now That You Are a Christian. Savannah, Georgia: Sunday School Research Institute, 1976.
- The Successful Sunday School and Teacher’s Guidebook. Carol Stream, Illinois: Creation House, 1976.
- How to Grow an Effective Sunday School. Denver, Colorado: Accent Books, 1979.
- The Successful Christian Life. Denver, Colorado: Accent Books, 1979.
- Church Aflame II. Lynchburg, Virginia: Liberty Baptist Seminary, 1981.
- The Complete Book of Church Growth. Wheaton, Illinois: Tyndale House Publishers, Inc., 1981 (with John V. Vaughan and David J. Seifert).
- Say-It-Faith. Wheaton, Illinois: Tyndale House Publishers, Inc., 1983.
- What the Faith Is All About. Wheaton, Illinois: Tyndale House Publishers, 1983.
- Stepping Out on Faith. Wheaton, Illinois: Tyndale House Publishers, 1984 (with Jerry Falwell).
- Theology for Today. Lynchburg, Virginia: Church Leadership Institute, 1985.
- Getting a Church Started. Lynchburg, Virginia: Church Growth Institute, 1985.
- John: The Greatest Book in the Bible. Lynchburg, Virginia: Church Leadership Institute, 1985.
- Tithing Is Christian. Savannah, Georgia: Sunday School Research Institute, 1985.
- God Is Able. Lynchburg, Virginia: Church Growth Institute, 1986 (with John Maxwell).
- Becoming a Leader. Lynchburg, Virginia: Church Growth Institute, 1986.
- Church Growth: State of the Art. Wheaton, Illinois: Tyndale House Publishers, Inc., 1986.
- Winning the Winnable – Friendship Evangelism. Lynchburg, Virginia: Church Leadership Institute, 1986.
- The Names of Jesus. Denver, Colorado: Accent Books, 1987.
- 154 Steps to Revitalize Your Sunday School and Keep Your Church Growing. Lynchburg, Virginia: Church Growth Institute, 1988.
- Understanding the Deeper Life. Old Tappan, New Jersey: Fleming Revell, 1988.
- Say It Faith: Building the Sunday School by Faith. Indianapolis, Indiana: Wesley Press, 1988 (with David L. Keith).
- History Makers of the Old Testament. Wheaton, Illinois: Victory Books, 1989.
- How to Reach Your Friends for Christ. Lynchburg, Virginia: Church Growth Institute, 1989.
- The Gospel of John: Believe and Live. Grand Rapids, Michigan: Fleming Revell, 1990.
- Ten of Today’s Most Innovative Churches. Ventura, California: Regal Books, 1990.
- My Father’s Names. Ventura, California: Regal Books, 1991.
- The Towns Sunday School Encyclopedia. Wheaton, Illinois: Tyndale House Publishers, 1991.
- The Eight Laws of Leadership. Lynchburg, Virginia: Church Growth Institute, 1992.
- Foundational Doctrines of the Faith: Knowing What We Believe and Why. Lynchburg, Virginia: Church Growth Institute, 1992.
- Ten Sunday Schools That Dared to Change. Ventura, California: Regal Books, 1993.
- The Names of the Holy Spirit. Ventura, California: Regal Books, 1994.
- What is Right: Biblical Principles for Decision – Making. Lynchburg, Virginia: Church Growth Institute, 1995.
- When God is Silent: How to Hear God When He Seems Far Away. Lynchburg, Virginia: Church Growth Institute, 1995.
- A Journey Through the New Testament. Fort Worth, Texas: Harcourt Brace, 1996.
- A Journey Through the Old Testament. Fort Worth, Texas: Harcourt Brace, 1996.
- A Practical Encyclopedia: Evangelism and Church Growth. Ventura, California: Regal Books, 1996.
- Biblical Studies for Fasting. Lynchburg, Virginia: Church Growth Institute, 1996.
- Fasting for Spiritual Breakthrough. Ventura, California: Regal Books, 1996.
- Habits of the Heart: How to Develop Winning Character. Lynchburg, Virginia: Church Growth Institute, 1996.
- Stories on the Front Porch. Ventura, California: Regal Books, 1996.
- Praying the Lord’s Prayer for Spiritual Breakthrough. Ventura, California: Regal Books, 1997.
- Stories About My First Church. Ventura, California: Regal Books, 1997.
- Biblical Meditation for Spiritual Breakthrough. Ventura, California: Regal Books, 1998.
- Fasting Can Change Your Life. Ventura, California: Regal Books, 1998.
- The Son. Ventura, California: Regal Books, 1999.
- God Encounters: To Touch God and Be Touched by Him. Ventura, California: Regal Books, 2000.
- Into the Future: Turning Today’s Church Trends Into Tomorrow’s Opportunities. Grand Rapids, Michigan: Fleming Revell, 2000 (with Warren Bird).
- The Ten Greatest Revivals Ever. Ann Arbor, Michigan: Servant Publications, 2000 (with Douglas Porter).
- Praying the 23rd Psalm. Shippensburg, Pennsylvania: Destiny Image, 2001.
- Fasting for Financial Breakthrough. Ventura, California: Regal Books, 2002.
- Knowing God Through Fasting. Shippensburg, Pennsylvania: Destiny Image, 2002.
- Prayer Partners. Ventura, California: Regal Books, 2002.
- Women Gifted for Ministry: How to Discover and Practice Your Gifts. Nashville, Tennessee: Thomas Nelson, Inc., 2002 (with Ruth Towns).
- Churches That Multiply. Kansas City, Missouri: Beacon Hill Press, 2003 (with Douglas Porter).
- God Bless You. Ventura, California: Regal Books, 2003.
- What Every Sunday School Teacher Should Know. Ventura, California: Regal Books, 2003.
- Praying the Psalms. Shippensburg, Pennsylvania: Destiny Image, 2004.
- Understanding the Christian Life. Virginia Beach, Virginia: Academx Publishing Company, 2005.
