= Liberty Middle School =

Liberty Middle School is the name of several United States middle schools:

- Liberty Middle School (Florida), in Tampa
- Liberty Middle School (Ocala, Florida)
- Liberty Middle School (Orlando, Florida); see Orange County Public Schools § Schools
- Liberty Middle School (Georgia)
- Liberty High School (Liberty, Missouri)
- Liberty Middle School (Nebraska), a school in the Papillion-La Vista school district
- Liberty Middle School (New Jersey)
- Liberty Middle School (Virginia)
- Washington-Liberty High School (Arlington, Virginia)
- Liberty Middle School, Camas Washington

== See also ==
- Liberty North High School (Liberty, Missouri)
- Liberty High School (disambiguation)
- Liberty School (disambiguation)
