= Liberty Hill =

Liberty Hill may refer to:

== Places ==
Ireland

- Liberty Hill, Cortober, County Roscommon, Ireland

United States

(by state)

- Liberty Hill Historic District, San Francisco, California; listed on the NRHP in San Francisco
- Liberty Hill site, San Pedro, Los Angeles, location of a key event of the 1923 San Pedro maritime strike
- Houston, Georgia, also called Liberty Hill
- Liberty Hill (La Grange, Georgia), NRHP-listed
- Liberty Hill, Cincinnati, Ohio
- Liberty Hill, Pittsburgh, Pennsylvania
- Liberty Hill, South Carolina
  - Liberty Hill Historic District, Liberty Hill, South Carolina; listed on the NRHP in Kershaw County, South Carolina
- Liberty Hill, Tennessee (disambiguation), multiple places
- Liberty Hill, Texas
- Liberty Hill, West Virginia

== See also ==
- Liberty Hill School (disambiguation)
- Liberty Hills (disambiguation)
