= Liberty Hill School =

Liberty Hill School or Liberty Hill Schoolhouse may refer to:

- Liberty Hill Schoolhouse (Gainesville, Florida), listed on the National Register of Historic Places (NRHP)
- Liberty Hill School (Ellerbe, North Carolina), listed on the NRHP in Richmond County, North Carolina
- Liberty Hill School (Liberty Hill, Tennessee), NRHP-listed in Williamson County

== See also ==
- Liberty Hill (disambiguation)
- Liberty School (disambiguation)
