= Liberty Hill, Tennessee =

Liberty Hill, Tennessee may refer to the following places in the U.S. state of Tennessee:

- Liberty Hill, Cocke County, Tennessee, an unincorporated community
- Liberty Hill, Fayette County, Tennessee, an unincorporated community
- Liberty Hill, Giles County, Tennessee, an unincorporated community
- Liberty Hill, Grainger County, Tennessee, an unincorporated community
- Liberty Hill, Greene County, Tennessee, an unincorporated community
- Liberty Hill, McMinn County, Tennessee, an unincorporated community
- Liberty Hill, Rhea County, Tennessee, an unincorporated community
- Liberty Hill, Williamson County, Tennessee, an unincorporated community
- Liberty Hill, Wilson County, Tennessee, an unincorporated community
