= Jerry Falwell =

American Baptist pastor, televangelist, and conservative activist (1933–2007)

The Reverend Jerry Falwell
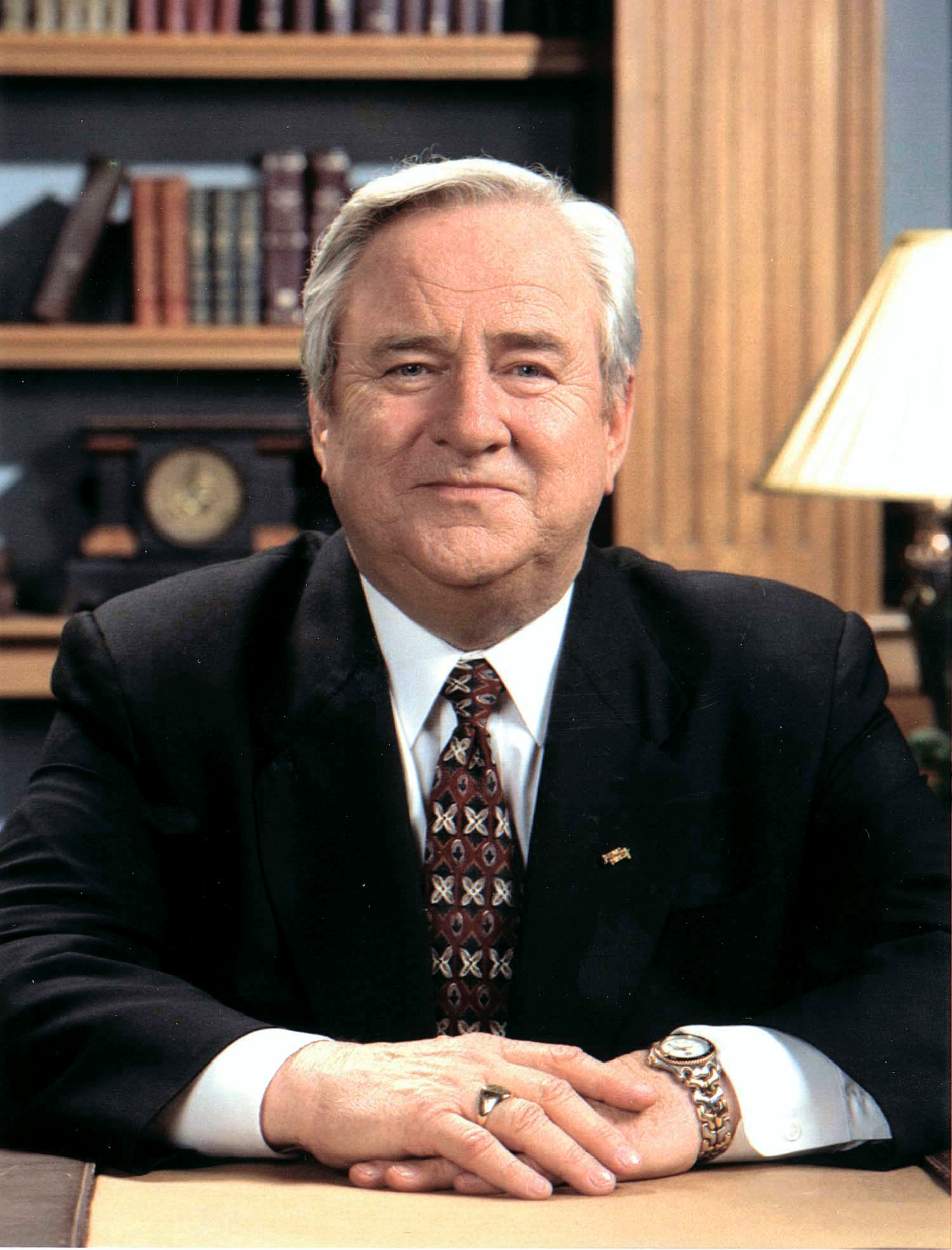
- Portrait as President of Liberty University, made before 2007
- Born: Jerry Laymon Falwell; August 11, 1933; Lynchburg, Virginia, U.S.
- Died: May 15, 2007 (aged 73); Lynchburg, Virginia, U.S.
- Occupations: Pastor; televangelist; political activist
- Known for: Founding the Moral Majority
- Television: The Old-Time Gospel Hour
- Title: Chancellor of Liberty University (1971–2007)
- Political party: Republican
- Spouse: Macel Pate (m. 1958)
- Children: 3, including Jerry Jr. and Jonathan

Ecclesiastical career
- Religion: Christianity (Baptist)
- Church: Baptist Bible Fellowship International; Southern Baptist Convention
- Ordained: 1956
- Congregations: Thomas Road Baptist Church

Jerry Laymon Falwell (Note: Pronounced /ˈfɔːlwɛl/.) (August 11, 1933 – May 15, 2007) was an American Baptist pastor, televangelist, and politically conservative activist. He was the founding pastor of the Thomas Road Baptist Church, a megachurch in Lynchburg, Virginia. He founded Lynchburg Christian Academy, later renamed Liberty Christian Academy, in 1967, founded Liberty University in 1971, and co-founded the Moral Majority in 1979.

== Early life and education ==
Falwell and his twin brother Gene were born in the Fairview Heights area of Lynchburg, Virginia, on August 11, 1933, the sons of Helen Virginia (née Beasley) and Carey Hezekiah Falwell. His father was an entrepreneur and one-time bootlegger who was agnostic. His father shot and killed his brother Garland and died of cirrhosis of the liver in 1948 at the age of 55. His paternal grandfather was a staunch atheist. Jerry Falwell was a member of a group in Fairview Heights known to the police as "the Wall Gang" because they sat on a low concrete wall at the Pickeral Café. Falwell met Macel Pate on his first visit to Park Avenue Baptist Church in 1949; Macel was a pianist there. They married on April 12, 1958. The couple had two sons, Jerry Jr. (a lawyer who succeeded Jerry Sr. as president of Liberty University until 2020) and Jonathan (who succeeded Jerry Sr. as senior pastor at Thomas Road Baptist Church, and became chancellor of Liberty University in 2023), and a daughter, Jeannie (a surgeon).

Falwell and his wife had a close relationship, and she supported him throughout his career. The Falwells often appeared together in public, and did not shy away from showing physical affection. Of his marriage, Falwell jokingly said: "Macel and I have never considered divorce. Murder maybe, but never divorce." Macel appreciated her husband's non-combative, affable nature, writing in her book that he "hated confrontation and didn't want strife in our home ... he did everything in his power to make me happy." The Falwells had been married for nearly 50 years when Jerry died.

Falwell graduated from Brookville High School in Lynchburg, and from then-unaccredited Baptist Bible College in Springfield, Missouri, in 1956. He enrolled there to subvert Pate's relationship with her fiancé, who was a student there. Falwell was later awarded three honorary doctorates: Doctor of Divinity (1968) from Tennessee Temple Theological Seminary, Doctor of Letters from California Graduate School of Theology, and Doctor of Laws from Central University in Seoul, South Korea.

== Associated organizations ==
=== Thomas Road Baptist Church ===
In 1956, aged 22, Falwell founded the Thomas Road Baptist Church. Originally at 701 Thomas Road in Lynchburg, with 35 members, it became a megachurch. Also in 1956, Falwell began The Old-Time Gospel Hour, a nationally syndicated radio and television ministry. When Falwell died, his son Jonathan inherited his father's ministry, and took over as the church's senior pastor. The weekly program's name was then changed to Thomas Road Live.

=== Liberty Christian Academy ===
During the 1950s and 1960s, Falwell spoke and campaigned against the civil rights activist Martin Luther King Jr. and the racial desegregation of public school systems by the federal government. Liberty Christian Academy (LCA, founded as Lynchburg Christian Academy) is a Christian school in Lynchburg that the Lynchburg News in 1966 called "a private school for white students".

Falwell opened The Lynchburg Christian Academy in 1967 as a segregation academy and a ministry of Thomas Road Baptist Church.

The Liberty Christian Academy is recognized as an educational facility by the Commonwealth of Virginia through the Virginia State Board of Education, Southern Association of Colleges and Schools, and the Association of Christian Schools International.

=== Liberty University ===
In 1971, Falwell co-founded Liberty University with Elmer L. Towns. Liberty University offers over 350 accredited programs of study, with approximately 16,000 students on-campus and 100,000 online.

=== Moral Majority ===
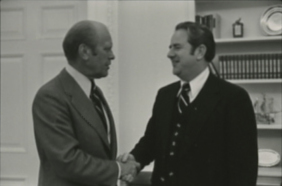
Falwell greeting President Gerald Ford in 1976

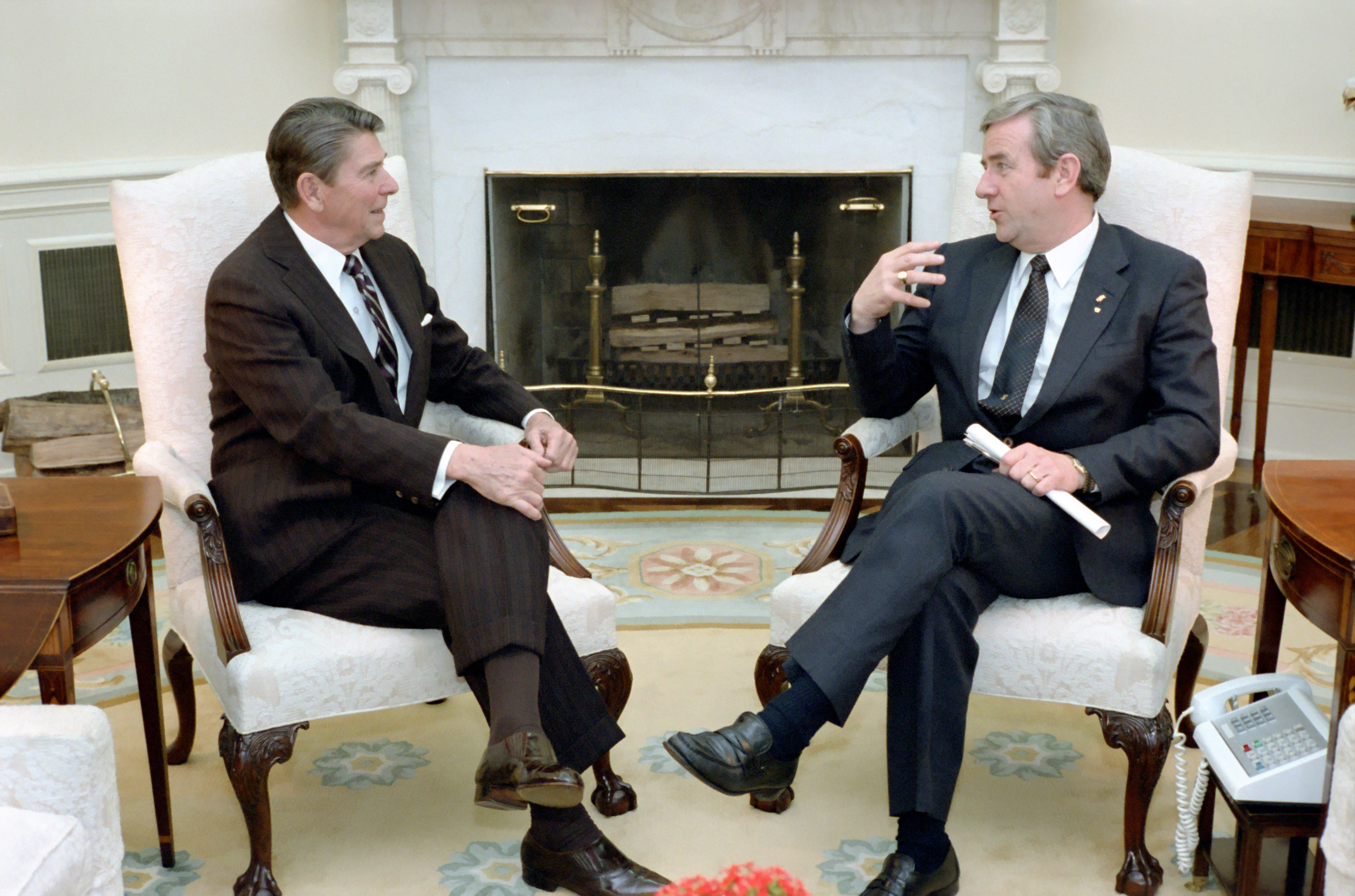
Falwell with President Ronald Reagan in 1983

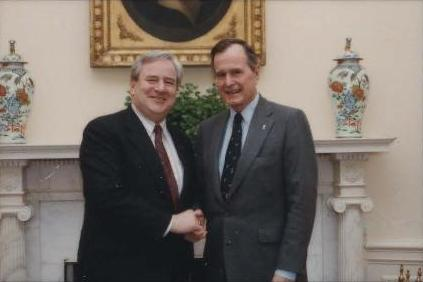
Falwell with President George H. W. Bush in 1991

During the 1980s, the Moral Majority became one of the largest political lobbies for evangelical Christians in the U.S. According to Falwell's autobiography, the Moral Majority was promoted as "pro-life, pro-traditional family, pro-moral, and pro-American" and was credited with delivering two-thirds of the white evangelical vote to Ronald Reagan in the 1980 presidential election. According to Jimmy Carter, "that autumn [1980] a group headed by Jerry Falwell purchased $10 million in commercials on southern radio and TV to brand me as a traitor to the South and no longer a Christian." As head of the Moral Majority, Falwell consistently supported Republican candidates and conservative politics. This led Billy Graham to criticize him for "sermonizing" about political issues that lacked a moral element. At the time of Falwell's death, Graham said: "We did not always agree on everything, but I knew him to be a man of God. His accomplishments went beyond most clergy of his generation."

=== PTL ===
Falwell rides the water slide at Heritage USA.

In March 1987, Pentecostal televangelist Jim Bakker came under media scrutiny when it was revealed that he had a sexual encounter with, and allegedly raped, Jessica Hahn, and had paid for her silence. Bakker believed that fellow Pentecostal pastor Jimmy Swaggart was attempting to take over his ministry because he had initiated a church investigation into allegations of his sexual misconduct. To avoid the takeover, Bakker resigned on March 19 and appointed Falwell to succeed him as head of his PTL ministry, which included the PTL Satellite Network, television program The PTL Club and the Christian-themed amusement park Heritage USA.

Bakker believed Falwell would lead the ministry temporarily, until the scandal died down, but Falwell barred Bakker from returning to PTL on April 28, calling him "probably the greatest scab and cancer on the face of Christianity in 2,000 years of church history". Later that summer, as donations to the ministry declined in the wake of Bakker's scandal and resignation, Falwell raised $20 million to keep PTL solvent and delivered on a promise to ride the water slide at Heritage USA. Despite this, Falwell was unable to save the ministry from bankruptcy, and he resigned in October 1987.

== Social and political views ==
=== Families ===
Falwell advocated beliefs and practices influenced by his version of biblical teachings.

=== Tithing ===
In 1989, he told Liberty University employees that membership in his church and tithing were mandatory.

=== Vietnam War ===
Falwell felt the Vietnam War was being fought with "limited political objectives" when it should have been an all-out war against the North. In general, Falwell held that the president "as a minister of God" has the right to use arms to "bring wrath upon those who would do evil."

=== Civil rights ===
On his evangelist program The Old-Time Gospel Hour in the mid-1960s, Falwell regularly featured segregationist politicians like governors Lester Maddox and George Wallace. Of Martin Luther King Jr., he said: "I do question the sincerity and nonviolent intentions of some civil rights leaders such as Dr. Martin Luther King Jr., Mr. James Farmer, and others, who are known to have left-wing associations."

Of Brown v. Board of Education, he said in 1958:

If Chief Justice Warren and his associates had known God's word and had desired to do the Lord's will, I am quite confident that the 1954 decision would never have been made. The facilities should be separate. When God has drawn a line of distinction, we should not attempt to cross that line.

In 1977, Falwell supported Anita Bryant's "Save Our Children" campaign to overturn an ordinance in Dade County, Florida, prohibiting discrimination on the basis of sexual orientation. He supported a similar movement in California.

Twenty-eight years later, during a 2005 MSNBC television appearance, Falwell said he was not troubled by reports that the nominee for Chief Justice of the United States Supreme Court, John G. Roberts, had done volunteer legal work for gay rights activists in the case Romer v. Evans. Falwell told then-MSNBC host Tucker Carlson that if he were a lawyer, he too would argue for civil rights for LGBT people. "I may not agree with the lifestyle, but that has nothing to do with the civil rights of that part of our constituency", said Falwell. When Carlson countered that conservatives "are always arguing against 'special rights' for gays", Falwell said equal access to housing and employment are basic rights, not special rights. "Civil rights for all Americans, black, white, red, yellow, the rich, poor, young, old, gay, straight, et cetera, is not a liberal or conservative value. It's an American value that I would think that we pretty much all agree on."

=== Israel and Jews ===
Falwell's relationship with Israeli Prime Minister Menachem Begin was reported in the media in 1981. Falwell's staunch pro-Israel stance, sometimes called "Christian Zionism", drew the support of the Anti-Defamation League and its leader Abraham Foxman, but they condemned what they perceived as intolerance toward Muslims in Falwell's public statements. They also criticized him for saying that "Jews can make more money accidentally than you can on purpose". In his book Listen, America!, Falwell called the Jewish people "spiritually blind and desperately in need of their Messiah and Savior."

In the 1984 book Jerry Falwell and the Jews, Falwell is quoted saying:

I feel that the destiny of the state of Israel is without question the most crucial international matter facing the world today. I believe that the people of Israel have not only a theological but also a historical and legal right to the land. I am personally a Zionist, having gained that perspective from my belief in Old Testament Scriptures. I have also visited Israel many times. I have arrived at the conclusion that unless the United States maintains its unswerving devotion to the State of Israel, the very survival of that nation is at stake ... Every American who agrees Israel has the right to the land must be willing to exert all possible pressure on the powers that be to guarantee America's support of the State of Israel at this time.

Falwell's geopolitical stance on Israel faced significant criticism from secular and left-wing commentators. Critics, including Christopher Hitchens, argued that Falwell's unyielding Christian Zionism was rooted entirely in apocalyptic dispensationalism. Hitchens asserted that Falwell deliberately allied himself with the most radical, theocratic elements in Israel to accelerate an end-time biblical prophecy (the Battle of Armageddon), thereby actively undermining secular democratic avenues for a peaceful solution to the Middle East conflict.

=== Education ===
Falwell repeatedly denounced certain teachings in public schools and secular education in general, calling them breeding grounds for atheism, secularism, and humanism, which he claimed to be in contradiction with Christian morality. He advocated that the U.S. change its public education system by implementing a school voucher system that would allow parents to send their children to either public or private schools. In his book America Can Be Saved, he wrote: "I hope I live to see the day when, as in the early days of our country, we won't have any public schools. The churches will have taken them over again and Christians will be running them."

Falwell supported President George W. Bush's Faith Based Initiative, but had strong reservations about where the funding would go and the restrictions placed on churches:

My problem is where it might go under his successors. ... I would not want to put any of the Jerry Falwell Ministries in a position where we might be subservient to a future Bill Clinton, God forbid. ... It also concerns me that once the pork barrel is filled, suddenly the Church of Scientology, the Jehovah Witnesses [sic], the various and many denominations and religious groups—and I don't say those words in a pejorative way—begin applying for money—and I don't see how any can be turned down because of their radical and unpopular views. I don't know where that would take us.

=== Apartheid ===
In the 1980s Falwell said sanctions against South Africa's apartheid regime would result in what, he felt, would be a worse situation, such as a Soviet-backed revolution. He also urged his followers to buy up gold Krugerrands and push U.S. "reinvestment" in South Africa. In 1985 he drew the ire of many when he called Nobel Peace Prize winner and Anglican Archbishop Desmond Tutu a phony "as far as representing the black people of South Africa".

=== The Clinton Chronicles ===
In 1994, Falwell promoted and distributed the video documentary The Clinton Chronicles: An Investigation into the Alleged Criminal Activities of Bill Clinton. The video purported to connect Bill Clinton to a murder conspiracy involving Vince Foster, James McDougall, Ron Brown, and a cocaine-smuggling operation. The theory was discredited, but the video sold more than 150,000 copies.

The film's production costs were partly met by "Citizens for Honest Government", to which Falwell paid $200,000 in 1994 and 1995. In 1995 Citizens for Honest Government interviewed Arkansas state troopers Roger Perry and Larry Patterson about the Foster murder conspiracy theory. Perry and Patterson also gave information about the allegations in the Paula Jones affair.

The infomercial for the 80-minute videotape included footage of Falwell interviewing a silhouetted journalist who claimed to be afraid for his life. The journalist accused Clinton of orchestrating the deaths of several reporters and personal confidants who had gotten too close to his supposed illegal activities. The silhouetted journalist was subsequently revealed to be Patrick Matrisciana, the producer of the video and president of Citizens for Honest Government. "Obviously, I'm not an investigative reporter", Matrisciana admitted to investigative journalist Murray Waas. Later, Falwell seemed to back away from personally trusting the video. In an interview for the 2005 documentary The Hunting of the President, Falwell said, "to this day I do not know the accuracy of the claims made in The Clinton Chronicles."

=== Views on homosexuality ===
Falwell condemned homosexuality as forbidden by the Bible. Homosexual rights groups called Falwell an "agent of intolerance" and "the founder of the anti-gay industry" for statements he had made and for campaigning against LGBT social movements. Falwell supported Anita Bryant's 1977 "Save Our Children" campaign to overturn a Florida ordinance prohibiting discrimination on the basis of sexual orientation and a similar movement in California. In urging the ordinance's repeal, Falwell told one crowd, "Gay folks would just as soon kill you as look at you." When the LGBT-friendly Metropolitan Community Church was almost accepted into the World Council of Churches, Falwell called them "brute beasts" and said they were "part of a vile and satanic system" that "will be utterly annihilated, and there will be a celebration in heaven". He later denied saying this. Falwell also regularly linked the AIDS epidemic to LGBT issues and said, "AIDS is not just God's punishment for homosexuals, it is God's punishment for the society that tolerates homosexuals."

After comedian and actress Ellen DeGeneres came out as a lesbian, Falwell referred to her in a sermon as "Ellen DeGenerate". DeGeneres responded, "Really, he called me that? Ellen DeGenerate? I've been getting that since the fourth grade. I guess I'm happy I could give him work."

Falwell's legacy regarding homosexuality is complicated by his support for LGBT civil rights and his attempts to reconcile with the LGBT community in later years. In October 1999, he hosted a meeting of 200 evangelicals with 200 gay people and lesbians at Thomas Road Baptist Church for an "Anti-Violence Forum", during which he acknowledged that some evangelicals' comments about homosexuality qualified as hate speech that could incite violence. At the forum, Falwell told homosexuals in attendance, "I don't agree with your lifestyle, I will never agree with your lifestyle, but I love you" and added, "Anything that leaves the impression that we hate the sinner, we want to change that." He later told New York Times columnist Frank Rich that "admittedly, evangelicals have not exhibited an ability to build a bond of friendship to the gay and lesbian community. We've said go somewhere else, we don't need you here [at] our churches."

=== Teletubbies ===
In February 1999, a National Liberty Journal article (the media attributed it to Falwell) claimed that Tinky Winky, a Teletubby, was intended as a homosexual role model. The NLJ is a Liberty University publication. A 1998 Salon article had referred to Tinky Winky's status as a gay icon. In response, Steve Rice, spokesperson for Itsy Bitsy Entertainment, which licenses Teletubbies, a U.K. show for preschool children, in the U.S., said, "I really find it absurd and kind of offensive." The NLJ wrote, "he is purple—the gay pride color; and his antenna is shaped like a triangle—the gay-pride symbol". Tinky Winky also carries a magic bag, which the NLJ and Salon called a purse. Falwell added, "role-modeling the gay lifestyle is damaging to the moral lives of children".

=== September 11 attacks ===
Following the September 11 attacks in 2001, Falwell made highly controversial remarks during an appearance on Pat Robertson's The 700 Club. He stated: "I really believe that the pagans, and the abortionists, and the feminists, and the gays and the lesbians who are actively trying to make that an alternative lifestyle, the ACLU, People for the American Way, all of them who have tried to secularize America—I point the finger in their face and say 'you helped this happen.'" Falwell argued that by advancing secular causes and LGBT rights, these groups had removed America's "shield of divine protection" and angered God, thereby partially causing the tragedy.

These comments triggered immediate and widespread national condemnation from across the political spectrum, including a rebuke from the White House, which labeled the remarks "inappropriate." Critics accused Falwell of exploitation, moral bankruptcy, and effectively shifting the blame away from the terrorists onto American citizens. Following the intense backlash, Falwell issued an apology, stating: "If I left that impression with gays or lesbians or anyone else, I apologize," and clarified that he believed only the terrorists were to blame. However, the incident permanently hardened his reputation among detractors as an extremist who used national tragedies for ideological leverage.

=== Labor unions ===
Falwell said, "Labor unions should study and read the Bible instead of asking for more money. When people get right with God, they are better workers."

=== Relationship with American fundamentalism ===
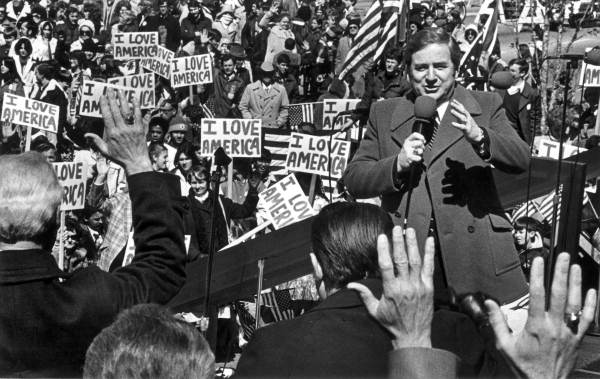
Falwell at an "I Love America" rally in 1980

In her extensive ethnographic study of Falwell, cultural anthropologist Susan Friend Harding noted that he adapted his preaching to win a broader, less extremist audience as he grew famous. This manifested itself in several ways. For example, though he was a teetotaler, Falwell no longer condemned "worldly" lifestyle choices such as dancing, drinking wine, and attending movie theaters; he softened his rhetoric predicting an apocalypse and God's vengeful wrath; and he shifted from a belief in outright biblical patriarchy to a complementarian view of appropriate gender roles. He also began to aim his strongest criticism at "secular humanists", pagans, and liberals rather than engaging in the racist, antisemitic, and anti-Catholic rhetoric common among Southern fundamentalist preachers but increasingly condemned as hate speech by the consensus of American society.

=== Islam ===
Falwell opposed Islam. According to Asharq Al-Awsat, a pan-Arab newspaper, he called Islam "satanic". In a televised interview with 60 Minutes, Falwell called Muhammad a "terrorist", adding, "I concluded from reading Muslim and non-Muslim writers that Muhammad was a violent man, a man of war." Falwell later apologized to Muslims for what he had said about Muhammad and affirmed that he did not intend to offend "honest and peace-loving" Muslims, but he refused to remove his comments about Islam from his website. In response, Egyptian Christian intellectuals signed a statement condemning what Falwell had said about Muhammad being a terrorist.

== Legal issues ==
Beginning in the 1970s, Falwell was involved in legal matters that occupied much of his time and increased his name recognition.

=== SEC and bonds ===
In 1972, the US Securities and Exchange Commission (SEC) launched an investigation of bonds issued by Falwell's organizations. The SEC charged Falwell's church with "fraud and deceit" in the issuance of $6.5 million in unsecured church bonds. The church won a 1973 federal court case prosecuted at the SEC's behest. The court exonerated the church and ruled that while technical violations of law did occur, there was no proof the church intended any wrongdoing.

=== Falwell versus Penthouse ===
Falwell filed a $10 million lawsuit against Penthouse for publishing an article based on interviews he gave to freelance reporters, after failing to convince a federal court to enjoin the article's publication. The suit was dismissed in federal district court in 1981 on the grounds that the article was not defamatory or an invasion of Falwell's privacy (the Virginia courts had not recognized this privacy tort, which is recognized in other states).

=== Hustler Magazine v. Falwell ===
In 1983, Larry Flynt's pornographic magazine Hustler ran a parody of a Campari ad featuring a mock "interview" with Falwell in which he admits that his "first time" was incest with his mother in an outhouse while drunk. Falwell sued for $45 million, alleging invasion of privacy, libel, and intentional infliction of emotional distress. A jury rejected the invasion of privacy and libel claims, holding that the parody could not have reasonably been taken to describe true events, but ruled in Falwell's favor on the emotional distress claim and awarded damages of $200,000. This was upheld on appeal. Flynt then appealed to the U.S. Supreme Court, which unanimously held that the First Amendment prevents public figures from recovering damages for emotional distress caused by parodies.

After Falwell's death, Flynt said of Falwell:

My mother always told me that no matter how much you dislike a person, when you meet them face to face you will find characteristics about them that you like. Jerry Falwell was a perfect example of that. I hated everything he stood for, but after meeting him in person, years after the trial, Jerry Falwell and I became good friends. He would visit me in California and we would debate together on college campuses. I always appreciated his sincerity even though I knew what he was selling and he knew what I was selling.

=== Falwell versus Jerry Sloan ===
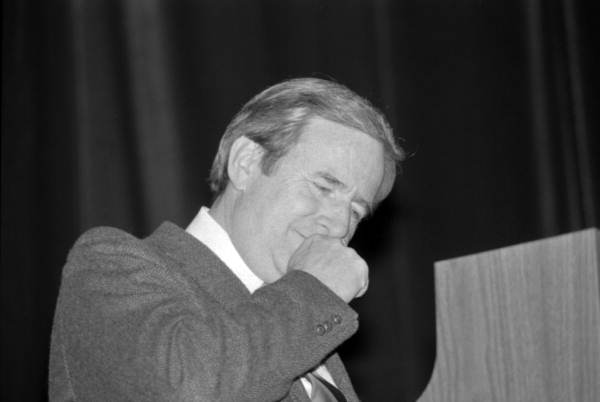
Falwell in Tallahassee, Florida, in 1984

In 1984, Falwell was ordered to pay gay rights activist and former Baptist Bible College classmate Jerry Sloan $5,000 after losing a court battle. In July 1984 during a televised debate in Sacramento, California, Falwell denied calling the gay-friendly Metropolitan Community Churches "brute beasts" and "a vile and Satanic system" that will "one day be utterly annihilated and there will be a celebration in heaven".

When Sloan insisted he had a tape, Falwell promised $5,000 if he could produce it. Sloan did, Falwell refused to pay, and Sloan successfully sued. The money was donated to build Sacramento's first LGBT community center, the Lambda Community Center, serving "lesbian, gay, bisexual, transgender, and intersex" communities. Falwell appealed the decision, with his attorney charging that the Jewish judge in the case was prejudiced. He lost again and was made to pay an additional $2,875 in sanctions and court fees.

=== Trademark infringement lawsuit against Christopher Lamparello ===
In Lamparello v. Falwell, a dispute over the ownership of the Internet domain fallwell.com, the United States Court of Appeals for the Fourth Circuit reversed an earlier District Court decision, arguing that Christopher Lamparello, who owned the domain, "clearly created his website intending only to provide a forum to criticize ideas, not to steal customers." Lamparello's website described itself as not being connected to Jerry Falwell and is critical of Falwell's views on homosexuality. On April 17, 2006, the Supreme Court declined to hear an appeal of the Appeals Court's ruling that Lamparello's usage of the domain was legal.

Before that, a different man had turned over jerryfalwell.com and jerryfallwell.com after Falwell threatened to sue for trademark infringement. Lawyers for Public Citizen Litigation Group's Internet Free Speech project represented the domain name owners in both cases.

== Apocalyptic beliefs ==
On July 31, 2006, CNN's Paula Zahn Now program featured a segment on "whether the crisis in the Middle East is actually a prelude to the end of the world". In an interview, Falwell said, "I believe in the pre-millennial, pre-tribulational coming of Christ for all of his church, and to summarize that, your first poll, do you believe Jesus' coming the second time will be in the future, I would vote yes with the 59 percent and with Billy Graham and most evangelicals." Based on that and other statements, Falwell has been identified as a dispensationalist.

In 1999, Falwell said the Antichrist would probably arrive within a decade and "of course he'll be Jewish". After accusations of antisemitism, Falwell apologized and explained he was simply expressing the theological tenet that the Antichrist and Christ share many attributes.

== Failing health and death ==
In early 2005, Falwell was hospitalized for two weeks with a viral infection, discharged, and re-hospitalized on March 30, 2005, in respiratory arrest. He was released from the hospital and returned to work. Later that year, a stent was implanted to correct a 70 percent blockage in his coronary arteries.

At about 10:45 a.m. on May 15, 2007, Falwell was found unconscious and without a pulse in his office after he missed a morning appointment, and was taken to Lynchburg General Hospital. "I had breakfast with him, and he was fine at breakfast... He went to his office, I went to mine and they found him unresponsive", said Ron Godwin, the executive vice president of Liberty University. His condition was initially reported as "gravely serious"; CPR was administered unsuccessfully. At 2:10 p.m., during a live press conference, a doctor from the hospital confirmed that Falwell had died of "cardiac arrhythmia, or sudden cardiac death". The hospital released a statement saying that he was pronounced dead at Lynchburg General Hospital at 12:40 p.m. He was 73. Falwell's wife and sons were at the hospital at the time of the pronouncement.

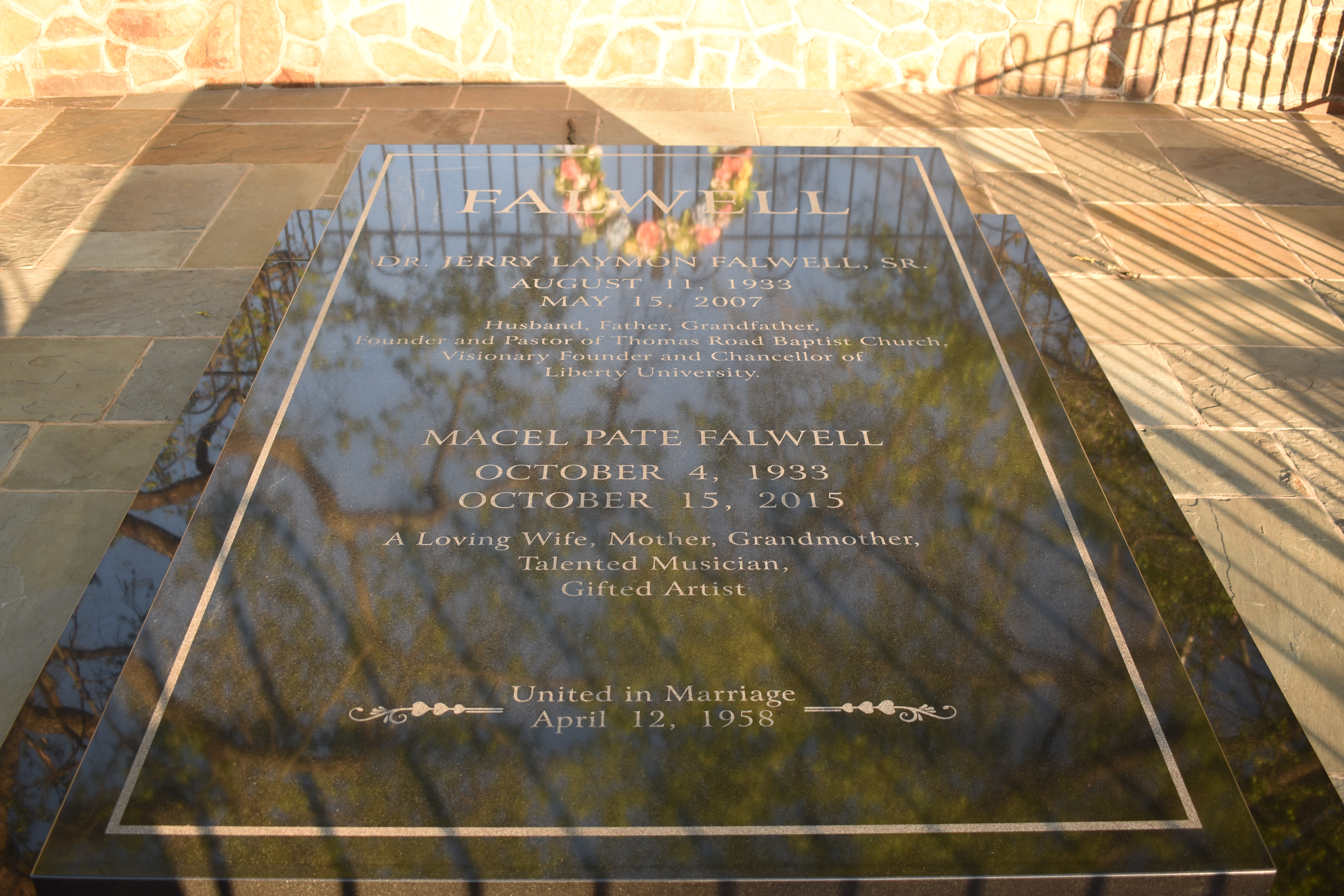
The Falwells' shared headstone

Falwell's funeral took place on May 22, 2007, at Thomas Road Baptist Church after he had lain in repose both at the church and at Liberty University. Falwell's burial service was private. He is interred at a spot on the Liberty University campus near the Carter Glass Mansion and Falwell's office. B. R. Lakin, his mentor, is buried nearby. After Falwell's death, his sons succeeded him at the two positions he held, Jerry Falwell Jr. as president of Liberty University and Jonathan Falwell as the senior pastor of Thomas Road Baptist Church. Jerry Falwell Sr.'s daughter, Jeannie F. Savas, is a surgeon.

The last televised interview with Jerry Falwell Sr. was conducted by Christiane Amanpour for the CNN original series CNN Presents: God's Warriors on May 8, 2007, a week before his death; in the interview he said that he had asked God for at least 20 more years in order to accomplish his vision for the university he founded. Falwell's last televised sermon was his May 13, 2007, message on Mother's Day.

== Legacy ==
Views on Falwell's legacy are mixed, reflecting the deep polarization he caused in American cultural and political life. Supporters praise him as a pioneering leader of the Religious Right who successfully mobilized millions of socially conservative evangelical Christians into active political participation, shaping the platform of the modern Republican Party. They also laud his extensive work in church planting and his financial and educational expansion of Liberty University.

Conversely, Falwell was a frequent target of severe criticism from secular groups, progressive activists, and secular commentators, who routinely labeled him an "agent of intolerance" and accused him of spreading hate speech. The antitheistic social commentator and author Christopher Hitchens was one of his most prominent and vociferous detractors, repeatedly characterizing Falwell's entire career as a "Chaucerian fraud" and a "conscious charlatan."

Hitchens and other media critics raised several core arguments regarding Falwell's negative impact on society:

- Exploitation of Religious Titles: Detractors argued that the media and political establishment gave Falwell an uncritical platform and protected him from standard journalistic scrutiny simply because he held the title of "Reverend." Hitchens contended that if any ordinary citizen without religious credentials made identical statements—such as claiming that public schools bred evil or that natural disasters were divine punishments—they would be widely dismissed as fringe extremists.
- Financial and Moral Charlatanism: Critics accused Falwell of using his televangelism empire and fear-based doctrines (such as the impending Apocalypse or the Rapture) primarily as a fundraising machine to accumulate personal wealth, fund private luxury jets, and expand his institutional power. They argued his financial model exploited the credulity of his working-class followers.
- Destructive Geopolitics: His embrace of far-right Israeli settler movements, framed around his dispensational end-times theology, was heavily criticized for sabotaging secular democratic avenues for Middle East peace, directly fueling international instability for theological reasons.
- Antisemitic Innuendo: Despite his public alliance with Jewish organizations for the defense of Israel, Falwell was criticized for promoting anti-Jewish tropes to his own congregations, such as his comment that "Jews can make more money accidentally than you can on purpose" and his public claim in 1999 that the Antichrist was alive and "of course he'll be Jewish."

Public pushback also manifested in direct activism against his ministry. In the mid-1980s, his toll-free telephone lines were overwhelmed by prank callers and activists, forcing the ministry to disconnect the number in 1986. At one point, these calls constituted an estimated 25 percent of his total incoming phone traffic. In a notable case, activist Edward Johnson programmed an Atari computer to automate thousands of continuous calls to Falwell's lines to protest the ministry's financial practices, generating a telephone bill for the ministry estimated at $500,000 before being halted by Southern Bell.

Jerry Falwell Jr. is a lawyer; he became president of Liberty University after his father's death and was put on indefinite leave from that position on August 7, 2020, after posting an inappropriate photo with a young woman on social media. He resigned on August 24 amid further questions about his and his wife's sexual and financial involvement with an associate. Falwell Jr. later said that the real reason his father began attending church as a teenager was that he had fallen in love with Macel, who played piano there and was engaged at the time, and that Falwell Sr. had used deception to convince her to break off the engagement.

Director Terrence Malick has an unproduced screenplay about the lives of Falwell and pianist-singer Jerry Lee Lewis.

== Publications ==
- Falwell, Jerry (January 30, 2006). Achieving Your Dreams. Thomas Nelson. ISBN 0-529-12246-4.
- Falwell, Jerry (October 17, 2005). Building Dynamic Faith. Thomas Nelson. ISBN 0-529-12133-6.
- Falwell, Jerry (1973). Capturing a Town for Christ. REVELL. ISBN 0-8007-0606-4.
- Champions for God. Victor Books, 1985. ISBN 9-780-89693534-1
- Church Aflame. (co-author Elmer Towns) Impact, 1971.
- Dynamic Faith Journal. Thomas Nelson (64 pages) (January 30, 2006) ISBN 0-529-12245-6
- Falwell: An Autobiography. Liberty House, 1996. (Ghost written by Mel White) ISBN 1-888684-04-6
- Fasting Can Change Your Life. Regal, 1998. ISBN 0-830-72197-5
- Finding Inner Peace and Strength. Doubleday, 1982.
- If I Should Die Before I Wake. Thomas Nelson, 1986. (ghost-written by Mel White)
- Jerry Falwell: Aflame for God. Thomas Nelson, 1979. (co-authors Gerald Strober and Ruth Tomczak)
- Liberty Bible Commentary on the New Testament. Thomas Nelson/Liberty University, 1978.
- Liberty Bible Commentary. Thomas Nelson, 1982.
- Listen, America! Bantam Books (July 1981) ISBN 0-553-14998-9
- Stepping Out on Faith. Tyndale House, 1984. ISBN 0-842-36626-1
- Strength for the Journey. Simon & Schuster, 1987. (ghost-written by Mel White)
- The Fundamentalist Phenomenon. Doubleday, 1981. ISBN 0-385-17383-0
- The Fundamentalist Phenomenon/The Resurgence of Conservative Christianity. Baker Book House, 1986.
- The New American Family. Word, 1992. ISBN 0-849-91050-1
- When It Hurts Too Much to Cry. Tyndale House, 1984. ISBN 0-8423-7993-2
- Wisdom for Living. Victor Books, 1984.

== See also ==
- Christian fundamentalism
- Faith and Values Coalition
- Jerry Johnston
- List of fatwas
- List of Southern Baptist Convention affiliated people
- National Christian Network

== Notes ==
Religious titles
New office	Senior Pastor of Thomas Road Baptist Church c. 1956 – 2007	Succeeded by Jonathan Falwell
Academic offices
New office	President of Liberty University; 1971–1997	Succeeded by John Borek
Preceded by John Borek	President of Liberty University; 2003–2007	Succeeded by Jerry Falwell Jr.
Non-profit organization positions
New office	President of the Moral Majority ?–1987	Succeeded by Jerry Nims
