= Montview =

Historic house in Virginia, United States

- U.S. National Register of Historic Places
- Virginia Landmarks Register
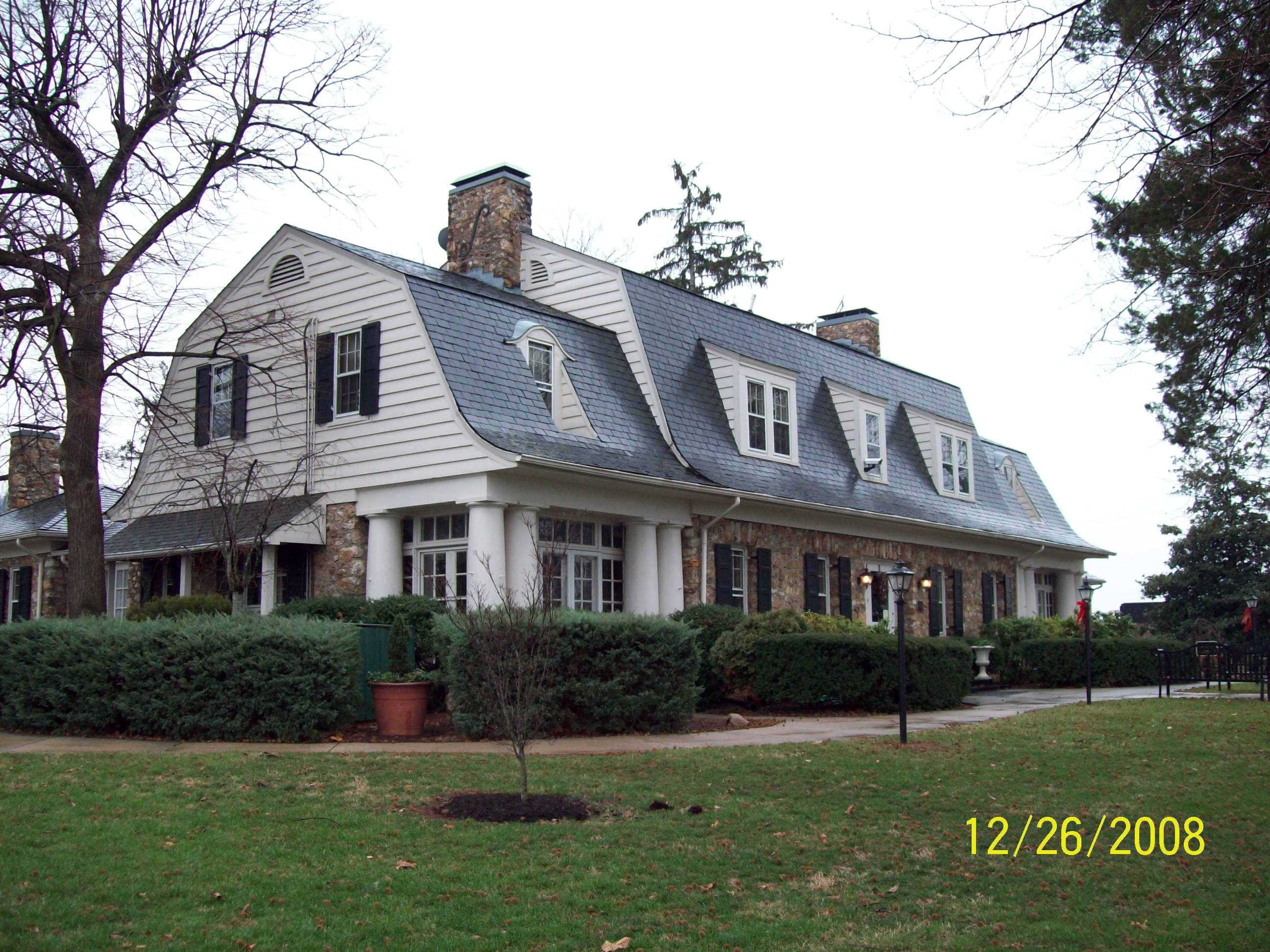
- Montview, December 2008

- Location within Virginia Location within the United States
- Location: Liberty University campus between VA 670 and US 29, Lynchburg, Virginia
- Coordinates: 37°21′10″N 79°10′43″W
- Area: 1.7 acres (0.69 ha)
- Built: 1923
- NRHP reference No.: 87000854
- VLR No.: 118-0210

Significant dates
- Added to NRHP: June 5, 1987
- Designated VLR: December 9, 1986

Montview, also known as the Carter Glass Estate, is a historic home located on the Liberty University campus at Lynchburg, Virginia.

== History ==
Then newly elected Senator Carter Glass, who had lived in downtown Lynchburg for many years in a house constructed a century earlier, directed this house's construction and moved in in 1923. It remained his official residence until his death in 1946. Although Senator Glass took his final oath of office on the glass-enclosed porch at Montview in 1943 and his funeral service was held on this estate, he physically lived his last years (and died) at the Mayflower Hotel in Washington, D.C.

== Present day ==
The property is now 1.7 acres (6,900 m^{2}) in extent with a 1 1/2-story main house, which has a gambrel-roofed, fieldstone central block, flanked by 1 1/2-story wings; and servant's quarters. Glass had an extensive library here, and also owned prize Jersey cattle. The current yard includes trees Glass planted; he also had operated a 300-acre dairy farm on his surrounding estate. Rev. Jerry Falwell used the home as his personal office and died at his desk; the graves of Falwell and his wife are located on the front lawn of the home.

== Significance ==
It was listed on the National Register of Historic Places in 1987.
