= Forest Hills School (Franklin, Tennessee) =

- U.S. National Register of Historic Places
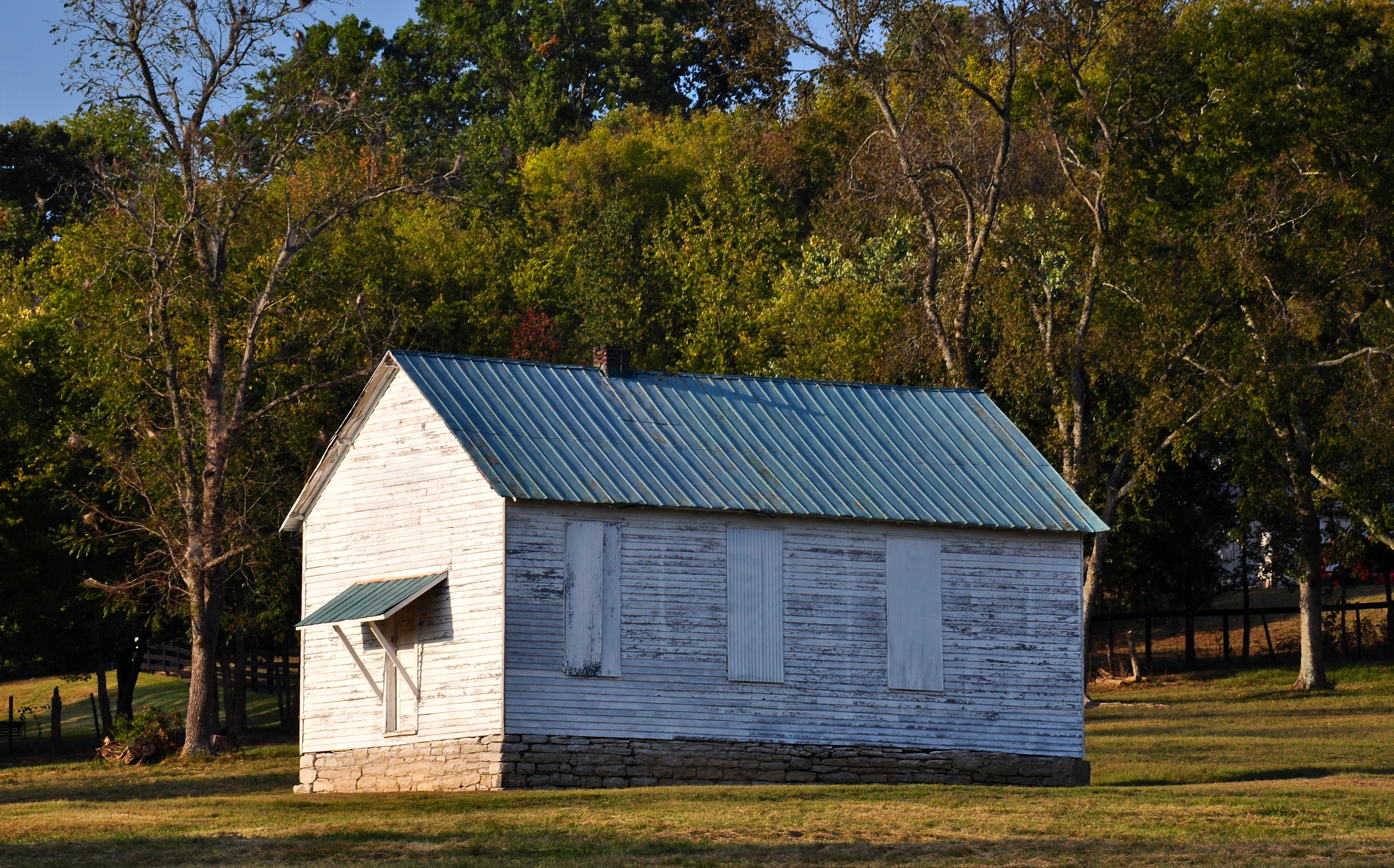
- Forest Hills School, September 2014.

- Location within Tennessee Location within the United States
- Location: Carters Creek Pike 2/10 mi. S of Bear Creek Rd., Franklin, Tennessee
- Coordinates: 35°51′51″N 86°57′15″W
- Area: 1 acre (0.40 ha)
- Built: 1907
- Architectural style: One-room schoolhouse
- MPS: Williamson County MRA
- NRHP reference No.: 88000290
- Added to NRHP: April 13, 1988

The Forest Hills School in Franklin, Tennessee was built in 1907. Along with Liberty School and Liberty Hill School, it is one of the three best surviving examples in Williamson County of one room schoolhouses built during 1900–1920. While most of these schools have been lost, they once provided the majority of public education in the county.

It was listed on the National Register of Historic Places in 1988.

The property is denoted WM-670 among Williamson County's historic resources.
