= Bobby Massie =

American football player (born 1989)

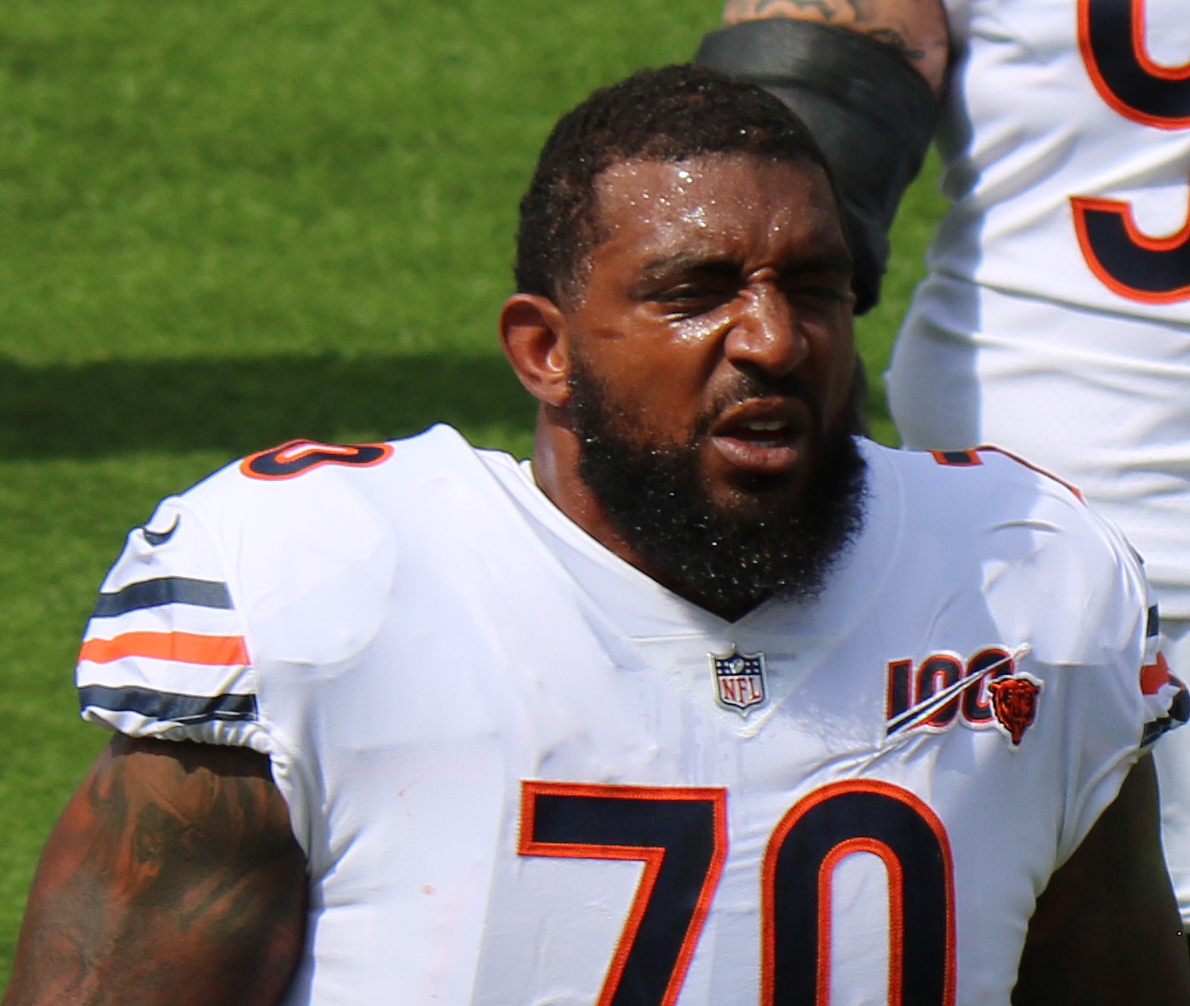
- Massie with the Chicago Bears in 2019

No. 70
- Position: Offensive tackle

Personal information
- Born: August 1, 1989 (age 37); Lynchburg, Virginia, U.S.
- Listed height: 6 ft 6 in (1.98 m)
- Listed weight: 325 lb (147 kg)

Career information
- High school: Liberty Christian Academy (Lynchburg)
- College: Ole Miss
- NFL draft: 2012: 4th round, 112th overall pick

Career history
- Arizona Cardinals (2012–2015); Chicago Bears (2016–2020); Denver Broncos (2021)

Career NFL statistics
- Games played: 131
- Games started: 123
- Stats at Pro Football Reference

Bobby Bryndale Massie (born August 1, 1989) is an American former professional football player who was an offensive tackle in the National Football League (NFL). He played college football for the Ole Miss Rebels. He was selected by the Arizona Cardinals in the fourth round of the 2012 NFL draft. He also played for the Chicago Bears and Denver Broncos.

== College career ==
Massie played three seasons for Ole Miss becoming a full-time starter midway through his freshman year. He started all 12 games at right tackle in both 2010 and 2011—his sophomore and junior years. He wore number 79.

Massie announced on January 6, 2012, that he would forgo his senior year and enter the 2012 NFL draft.

== Professional career ==
Pre-draft measurables
| Height | Weight | Arm length | Hand span | Wingspan | 40-yard dash | 10-yard split | 20-yard split | 20-yard shuttle | Three-cone drill | Vertical jump | Broad jump | Bench press |
|---|---|---|---|---|---|---|---|---|---|---|---|---|
| 6 ft 6 1/8 in (1.98 m) | 316 lb (143 kg) | 35 in (0.89 m) | 9 in (0.23 m) | 6 ft 9 3/4 in (2.08 m) | 5.23 s | 1.84 s | 3.02 s | 4.95 s | 7.70 s | 27.5 in (0.70 m) | 8 ft 7 in (2.62 m) | 22 reps |
All values from NFL Combine

=== Arizona Cardinals ===
Massie was considered one of the best fifteen offensive tackle prospects for the 2012 NFL draft by NFLDraftScout.com. On April 28, 2012, Massie was selected by the Arizona Cardinals in the fourth round (112th pick overall) of the NFL Draft. On September 5, 2015, Massie was suspended for the first two games of the 2015 season for violating the NFL's Policy and Program on Substances of Abuse.

=== Chicago Bears ===
On March 9, 2016, Massie signed a three-year contract with the Chicago Bears worth $18 million.

On January 26, 2019, Massie signed a four-year contract extension with the Bears through the 2022 season.

In Week 2 of the 2020 season against the New York Giants, Massie recorded his first career catch, a four yard pass intended for tight end Jimmy Graham, during the 17–13 win. He was placed on injured reserve on November 3, 2020, with a knee injury. He was designated to return from injured reserve on December 30, and began practicing with the team again, but the team did not activate him before the end of the season.

On March 17, 2021, the Bears declined the option on Massie's contract, making him an unrestricted free agent.

=== Denver Broncos ===
On May 12, 2021, Massie signed a one-year contract with the Denver Broncos worth $4 million.
