= Liberty Hills =

Liberty Hills may refer to

- Liberty Hills (Antarctica), a line of hills in West Antarctica
- Liberty Hills, Indiana, United States

== See also ==
- Liberty Hill (disambiguation)
