= Jerry Falwell Jr. =

American lawyer (born 1962)

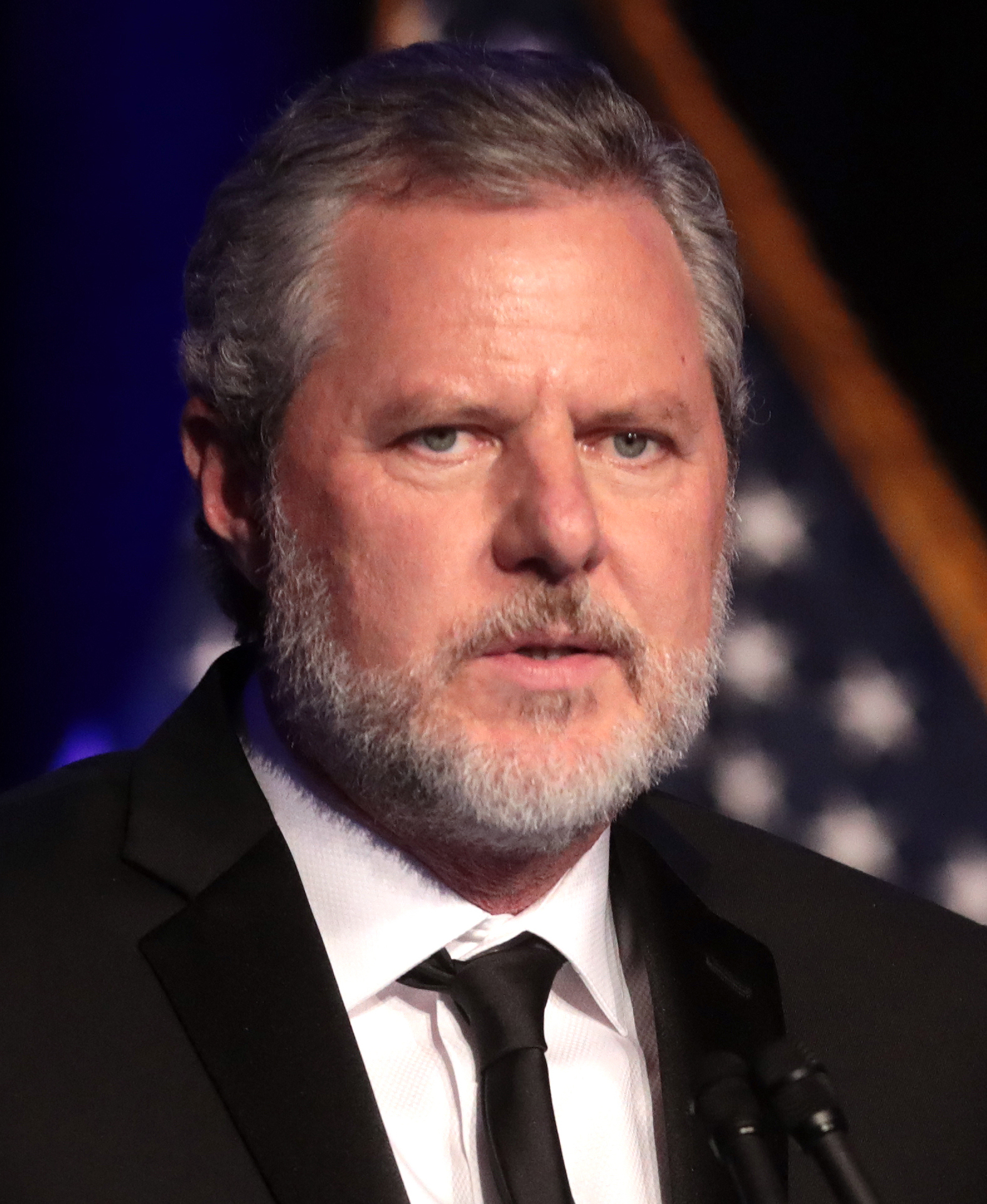
- Falwell in 2019

4th President of Liberty University
- In office May 15, 2007 – August 25, 2020
- Preceded by: Jerry Falwell
- Succeeded by: Jerry Prevo

Personal details
- Born: Jerry Lamon Falwell Jr. June 17, 1962 (age 64) Lynchburg, Virginia, U.S.
- Party: Republican
- Spouse: Becki Tilley (m. 1987)
- Children: 3
- Parent(s): Jerry Falwell; Macel Pate Falwell
- Relatives: Jonathan Falwell (brother)
- Education: Liberty University (BA); University of Virginia (JD)

Jerry Lamon Falwell Jr. (/ˈfɔːlwɛl/; born June 17, 1962) is an American attorney, former academic administrator, and Evangelical fundamentalist. Starting with his 2007 appointment upon the death of his father, televangelist and conservative activist Jerry Falwell, Falwell served as the president of Liberty University in Lynchburg, Virginia, until resigning in August 2020 amid a sex scandal.

== Early life and education ==
Jerry Falwell Jr. was born on June 17, 1962, the eldest son of Jerry Sr. and Macel Falwell (née Pate). He attended private schools in the Lynchburg area, including Lynchburg Christian Academy (later renamed as Liberty Christian Academy), from where he graduated in 1980. He then attended Liberty University, where he obtained a Bachelor of Arts in history and religious studies in 1984, and the University of Virginia School of Law, where he obtained a Juris Doctor in 1987.

== Career ==
From 1987 until 2007, Falwell served in private practice in Virginia and as the lawyer for Liberty University and its related organizations. He joined the Board of Trustees of the university in 2000.

=== 2007–2020: Liberty University ===
As part of a succession plan the elder Falwell laid out before his death, Jerry Jr. was to be entrusted with Liberty University while Jerry Sr.'s other son, Jonathan Falwell, inherited the ministry at Thomas Road Baptist Church. The decisions were rooted in each's personality: Jerry Jr. had aggressive business instincts, and Jonathan was more charismatic and interested in ministry. This succession plan took effect when Jerry Sr. died in 2007.

Liberty University was transformed under Falwell's leadership. When he took over in 2007, the school had listed assets of $259 million. For the fiscal year ending in 2017 its assets surpassed $2.5 billion. Under Falwell Jr., Liberty University came under scrutiny for its alleged authoritarian control over employees and students, nepotism toward Falwell family-owned businesses in the school's investments, and increasing influence of Falwell's wife Becki in school affairs. Beginning in 2001, Falwell had established two companies that enabled him to make property deals with Liberty-affiliated nonprofits, and his two sons and their wives were on Liberty's payroll. A 2019 Politico article described the university as a "dictatorship" in which Falwell ruled through fear; it also reported that the university had sold merchandise promoting Donald Trump's presidential campaign, and that Falwell Jr. had crude discussions about his sex life at work and had shown other Liberty employees provocative photos of his wife. Falwell's leadership also came under fire in a letter signed by members of Congress, Andy Levin and Jamie Raskin, to Betsy DeVos, which claimed that Falwell personally blocked students from writing student columns critical of Trump. Falwell responded with a letter saying the congressmen were "making many false statements and erroneous conclusions," and they showed "a fundamental lack of understanding of the scope and purpose" of the First Amendment, Title IX and Executive Order 13864. A Reuters article, published in August 2019, revealed that Falwell signed a real estate deal in 2016 that transferred the university's sports facilities, which had become a "drain on the university resources," to his personal trainer, who did not put down any money for the deal. The publication reported that instead, Liberty agreed to credit $580,000 off the purchase price as payment for leasing the property back to Liberty through 2025.

On August 7, 2020, Falwell took an indefinite leave of absence from his positions at Liberty University following controversy around a photo he had posted on social media, which showed him with his pants unzipped and his arm around the waist of a woman whose shorts were similarly unzipped. The photo was taken at a theme party where they dressed as characters from the raunchy Canadian television sitcom Trailer Park Boys. On August 23, Falwell made a public statement that his wife had had an affair and that they had been targets of blackmail. The next day Reuters published a story in which the man with whom Falwell's wife had an affair claimed that Falwell regularly watched him engaging in sexual activities with Falwell's wife. Later in the day, on August 24, Falwell agreed to resign from Liberty University. Falwell immediately denied this, while the university claimed that negotiations were ongoing. On August 25, both Falwell and Liberty University confirmed that he had resigned. Because he left his position without a formal accusation or admission of wrongdoing, Falwell was reportedly entitled to a $10.5 million severance package.

After his departure, Liberty opened an investigation into his past personal entanglement in the school's finances and real estate. In October 2020, Falwell sued Liberty University for damaging his reputation, but in December 2020 dropped the lawsuit.

On April 15, 2021, Liberty University sued Falwell for $40 million in damages for breach of contract and violation of fiduciary duty. In November 2021, Falwell revived his defamation lawsuit against Liberty University. Falwell has also sued the University in an attempt to receive $8.5 million in retirement funds, claiming that he met every requirement agreed upon in the Supplemental Executive Retirement Plan to receive payment. He would go on to sue the school again for the alleged exploitation of the trademark and image of his father, Jerry Falwell Sr., without consulting the Falwell family or "authorization of the Dr. Jerry L. Falwell Family Trust." In 2024, Liberty University was ordered to pay Falwell $15.3 million in a settlement concerning his resignation.

=== Possible governmental positions ===
In November 2016, President-elect Donald Trump offered him the position of United States secretary of education, but he turned down the offer citing personal reasons and because he did not want to leave Liberty University for more than two years. In January 2017, Falwell was asked by President Trump to head a task force on reforms for the United States Department of Education. In June 2017, Falwell confirmed to the Chronicle of Higher Education that he would be one of 15 college presidents participating in the task force. Six Democratic lawmakers wrote a letter to Betsy Devos expressing concern that there had been no public explanation by the administration about the purview of the task force. The task force was never formed.

=== 2019 sex scandal ===
In 2019, Reuters reported that Falwell asked Trump fixer Michael Cohen for a personal favor: to help get rid of photos described by Cohen as being the kind that would typically be kept "between husband and wife." At least three of the photos were later discovered to be of Falwell's wife.

According to Brandon Ambrosino, writing in Politico in 2019:

Longtime Liberty officials close to Falwell told me the university president has shown or texted his male confidants – including at least one employee who worked for him at Liberty – photos of his wife in provocative and sexual poses. At Liberty, Falwell is "very, very vocal" about his "sex life," in the words of one Liberty official – a characterization multiple current and former university officials and employees interviewed for this story support. In a car ride about a decade ago with a senior university official who has since left Liberty, "all he wanted to talk about was how he would nail his wife, how she couldn't handle [his penis size], and stuff of that sort," this former official recalled. Falwell did not respond to questions about this incident.

=== 2020–2021 sex scandal ===
In March 2012, Falwell and his wife and children stayed at the Fontainebleau Miami Beach luxury hotel, where Falwell's wife met and became friends with Giancarlo Granda, a twenty-year-old man who worked there as a pool attendant. The Falwells financially backed their son, Jerry "Trey" Falwell III, and Granda in a 2013 purchase of a South Beach hostel called the Alton Hostel, which operates under the name the Miami Hostel. A lawsuit was filed against the Falwells and the man in 2015, dismissed, and then refiled in August 2017. The plaintiffs, a man and his son, claimed they had helped to think of the hostel business idea but had then been wrongfully left out of the venture.

In May 2020, after Virginia governor Ralph Northam implemented a mask mandate amid the COVID-19 pandemic, Falwell criticized the mandate and tweeted a picture of a custom mask with Northam wearing blackface. Falwell apologized for the tweet in early June after being widely criticized by African-American alumni for being insensitive to the black community. He said, "I understand that by tweeting an image," of Ralph Northam's "racist past," he was actually refreshing the trauma that Northam had caused.

In late August, Reuters contacted Falwell and his wife with its initial reporting on his wife's alleged affair with the pool attendant they had met in 2012. Shortly after, on August 23, 2020, Falwell announced in a public statement that his wife had an "improper relationship" several years earlier with a man who later threatened to reveal the affair "unless we agreed to pay him substantial monies". On August 24, Reuters published its report that the man was the pool attendant with whom Falwell had invested in the hostel. The man, now twenty-nine years old, said he began a sexual relationship with the Falwells when he was twenty. He claimed that the affair started the same month he met the couple, in March 2012, and continued into 2018. He claimed to have had "frequent" sexual encounters with Becki Falwell while Jerry Falwell Jr. looked on, sometimes in the same room and sometimes remotely via camera. The man shared audiotape, emails, and texts with Reuters as evidence for the veracity of his assertions about the relationship.

Later in the day on August 24, it was reported that Falwell had agreed to resign from Liberty University, though Falwell denied the report. An anonymous university official told The Washington Post that there had been a delay in negotiations. On August 25, Falwell confirmed that he had resigned.

In October 2020, Falwell sued Liberty University for damaging his reputation, but in December 2020 dropped the lawsuit. On April 15, 2021, Liberty University sued him for $40 million for breach of contract and fiduciary duty. The suit also alleged that Falwell failed to disclose to the university's board of trustees his scandalous affair and "personal impairment by alcohol". In 2024, Liberty University was ordered to pay Falwell $15.3 million in a settlement concerning his resignation.

==== 2022 Vanity Fair interview ====
In January 2022, Falwell Jr. and his wife, Becki Tilley, spoke about their scandal in an interview with Vanity Fair. Tilley admitted to a three-year affair with the pool attendant, Giancarlo Granda, starting in March 2012 and continuing through 2014. She said they met when Granda was working at the Fontainebleau hotel in Miami Beach, and that they had made sex tapes with each other. Falwell said that he once walked in on his wife and the pool attendant having sex; he called it "traumatizing", though he had stayed to watch the couple. Tilley said that Granda pressured her into sex on one occasion in 2018 although she "kept saying no", and she realized later it could be considered assault. Granda denied the accusation but did not comment on the rest of the interview, promising answers in a forthcoming book and Hulu documentary, God Forbid: The Sex Scandal That Brought Down a Dynasty.

== Political views ==
=== Homosexuality and LGBT rights ===
In April 2009, following the Miss USA same-sex marriage controversy, Falwell offered a full scholarship to Carrie Prejean, a beauty pageant contestant who stated during the Miss USA pageant:

Well I think it's great that Americans are able to choose one way or the other. We live in a land where you can choose same-sex marriage or opposite marriage. You know what, in my country, in my family, I think I believe that marriage should be between a man and a woman, no offense to anybody out there. But that's how I was raised and I believe that it should be between a man and a woman.

In August 2013, Falwell announced that if the federal government forced recipients of its aid to comply with LGBTQ discrimination protections, he would forgo the money. In March 2019, Falwell again caused controversy among LGBT advocates at Liberty University when he said his granddaughter would be "raised according to her God-given gender".

=== Muslims ===
Speaking of the 2015 San Bernardino attack, Falwell stated during the university's 2015 convocation that if "some of those people had got what I have in my back pocket right now," the attack would not have happened. He said that he was astounded that Barack Obama believed more gun control was the best response to the attack. Falwell said that he'd "always thought that, if more good people had concealed-carry permits, then we could end those Muslims before they walked in and killed them."

His comments were criticized by Ibrahim Hooper from the Council on American-Islamic Relations, a Muslim civil rights and advocacy group. According to one report, Falwell was only heard saying, "then we could end those Muslims before they walked in", with the "and killed them" part drowned out by applause. Falwell later said he was referring to Muslims committing terrorist attacks and not Muslims in general.

=== Donald Trump ===
On January 26, 2016, Falwell endorsed Donald Trump for the Republican nomination in the 2016 presidential election, causing some Liberty University alumni and other evangelicals to suggest that Falwell had "sold his soul". It was later revealed that Falwell made his endorsement after Trump's personal lawyer and fixer Michael Cohen had embarked on a mission to recover "personal" photos involving the Falwells. On July 21, 2016, at the RNC convention in Cleveland, Ohio, Falwell called Trump "America's blue-collar billionaire" and "one of the greatest visionaries of our time", and said he was the candidate most likely to defend the "right to bear arms", "stop Iran...from becoming a nuclear power", and "appoint conservative pro-life justices to the Supreme Court".

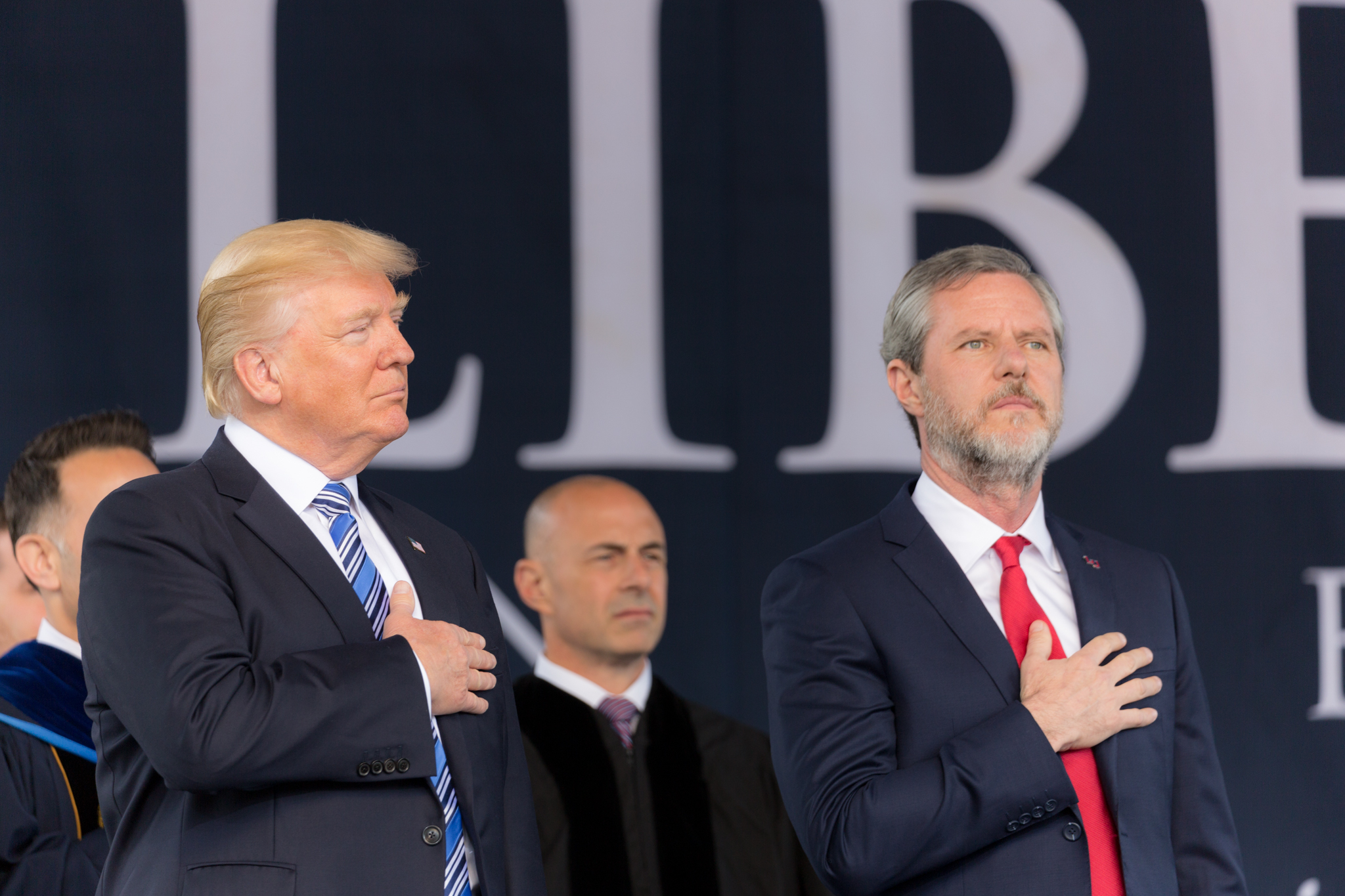
President Donald Trump and Falwell, 2017.

In an August 19, 2016, editorial in The Washington Post, Falwell compared Trump to Winston Churchill.

After Trump won the election, a group called the Red Letter Christians criticized Falwell for his pivotal role in "forging the alliance between white evangelicals and Donald J. Trump, who won 81 percent of their vote."

In April 2017, Falwell referred to Trump as the "dream president" for evangelicals and cited "reuniting Israel with America" and Trump's appointment of "people of faith" in his administration as the reasons why evangelicals support Trump. A few months later, Trump, by that time a personal friend of Falwell's, gave Liberty's commencement address. The New York Times would later describe Lynchburg as "the heart of pro-Trump evangelical Christianity".

In August 2017, following a white supremacist rally in Charlottesville, Falwell defended President Trump, saying that he didn't have "a racist bone in his body," adding that the president was being attacked by "thin-skinned Americans": "You know, he's a little abrasive sometimes in the way he says things, and we have some thin-skinned Americans sometimes who ignore the substance of what he's saying because they're put off by his demeanor," Falwell said. "And I think we need to grow up as a people and stop being so easily offended."

Asked in a January 2019 interview, "Is there anything President Trump could do that would endanger that support from you or other evangelical leaders?", Falwell answered, "No."

=== Israel ===
In June 2016, Falwell expressed support for Israel when Liberty University moved to invest $5 million of its endowment in Israel. Falwell stated, "Liberty is glad to be part of supporting the only democracy that's a close ally of the United States [in an area] that is in such turmoil right now."

=== Coronavirus response and conspiracy theories ===
In March 2020, the coronavirus disease 2019 (COVID-19) began to spread quickly in the United States, leading to the widespread closures of schools and universities. Within weeks, most universities in Virginia had announced that they were discontinuing in-person classes and moving their instruction to online-only. Falwell, however, defied those who called for such measures to limit the spread of the disease. On March 13, he announced that in-person classes at Liberty would resume after spring break (March 14–22). He said that people were overreacting to the coronavirus outbreak, alleged that Democrats were trying to use the situation to harm Trump, and promoted a conspiracy theory that North Korea and China had collaborated to create the coronavirus.

Liberty University lead physician Thomas W. Eppes Jr. informed Falwell, "We've lost the ability to corral this thing." Nevertheless, Falwell reopened Liberty on March 23, saying students could physically return to the campus. He said that the mortality rate among young people was low and said the media was exaggerating the threat of COVID-19: "They are willing to destroy the economy just to hurt Trump."

Lynchburg mayor Treney Tweedy and Virginia governor Ralph Northam criticized Falwell's decision to reopen the school. Marybeth Davis Baggett, a professor at Liberty University, protested the reopening in a March 23 op-ed published by The Washington Post and Religion News Service.

Of Liberty University's 15,000 on-campus students, 1,900 students initially returned; 800 of those subsequently left again. Falwell said the university administration had "no idea" how many other students had returned to off-campus housing. By March 30, Eppes reported, almost a dozen returning students had symptoms of COVID-19, eight students had been told to self-isolate, three had been tested, and one student (who lived off campus) had tested positive for the COVID-19 virus. By March 30, the school implemented a policy requiring any student who returned to school to self-quarantine for 14 days.

An anonymous student sued Liberty University in April, stating in the lawsuit, "Liberty's decision to tell its students that they could remain on campus to continue to use their housing, meal plans, parking, and the benefits of the services and activities for which their fees paid, was not only illusory and empty – because there were no more on-campus classes — but it was also extremely dangerous and irresponsible." In 2023 a judge dismissed the case and said the suit "fails on the merits."

== Personal life ==
Jerry Falwell Jr. is married to Becki Tilley and lives on a farm in Bedford County, Virginia. The couple have three children, including businessman Jerry "Trey" Falwell III. Before being let go by the university in 2021, Trey was the vice president for university operations at Liberty University. Falwell Jr. also owns the Alton Hostel (also called the Miami Hostel) in Miami's South Beach neighborhood.
