= Mike Strachan (wide receiver) =

Bahamian American gridiron football player (born 1997)

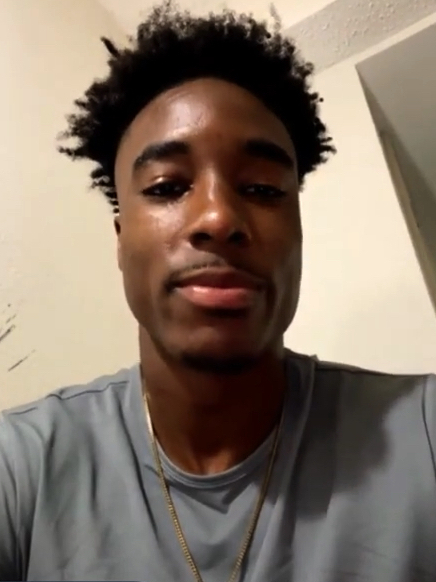
- Strachan in 2021

Profile
- Position: Wide receiver

Personal information
- Born: August 13, 1997 (age 29); Freeport, The Bahamas
- Listed height: 6 ft 5 in (1.96 m)
- Listed weight: 225 lb (102 kg)

Career information
- High school: Liberty Christian (Lynchburg, Virginia, U.S.)
- College: Charleston (2016–2020)
- NFL draft: 2021: 7th round, 229th overall pick

Career history
- Indianapolis Colts (2021–2023); Carolina Panthers (2023); Washington Commanders (2024)*
- * Offseason or practice squad member only

Awards and highlights
- AFCA All-American (2019); 2× First-team All-MEC (2018, 2019)

Career NFL statistics
- Receptions: 6
- Receiving yards: 130
- Stats at Pro Football Reference

Michael Strachan (born August 13, 1997) is a Bahamian American professional football wide receiver. He played college football for the Charleston Golden Eagles and was selected by the Indianapolis Colts in the seventh round of the 2021 NFL draft. Strachan has also been a member of the Carolina Panthers and Washington Commanders.

== Early life ==
Strachan was born on August 13, 1997, in Freeport, Bahamas. He later moved to Lynchburg, Virginia, where he attended Liberty Christian Academy.

== College career ==
Strachan was a member of the Charleston Golden Eagles for four seasons. Strachan redshirted his true freshman year and played sparingly the following season, catching one pass. As a redshirt sophomore, Strachan set a school record with 1,007 receiving yards along with eight touchdowns on 48 receptions and was named first-team All-Mountain East Conference (MEC). Strachan was again named first-team All-MEC after catching 78 passes for 1,319 yards and 19 touchdowns, all new school records, during his redshirt junior season. He opted to forgo his final season, which was postponed until spring due to the COVID-19 pandemic, to declare for the 2021 NFL draft.

Strachan also was a member of Charleston's track & field team and won conference championships in the 200 meters, 400 meters, and the 4x400 meter relay and holds the school record for the 400 meter dash.

== Professional career ==
Pre-draft measurables
Height	Weight	Arm length	Hand span	40-yard dash	10-yard split	20-yard split	20-yard shuttle	Three-cone drill	Vertical jump	Broad jump	Bench press
6 ft 5 3/8 in (1.97 m)	226 lb (103 kg)	34 1/4 in (0.87 m)	10 in (0.25 m)	4.54 s	1.55 s	2.64 s	4.36 s	6.96 s	35.0 in (0.89 m)	10 ft 7 in (3.23 m)	20 reps
All values from NFL Combine

=== Indianapolis Colts ===
Strachan was selected in the seventh round with the 229th overall pick of the 2021 NFL draft by the Indianapolis Colts. On May 6, 2021, Strachan officially signed with the Colts. Strachan was released by the Colts on August 29, 2023, as part of final roster cuts. He was then signed to the Colts practice squad the following day.

On August 29, 2023, Strachan was waived by the Colts and re-signed to the practice squad. He was released on September 12.

=== Carolina Panthers ===
On September 13, 2023, Strachan was signed to the Carolina Panthers practice squad. During Week 10 of the 2023 NFL season Strachan had a career-long, 45-yard reception during the Panthers' game against the Chicago Bears. He was signed to the active roster on December 1. On August 27, 2024, Strachan was waived by the Panthers.

=== Washington Commanders ===
Strachan signed with the Washington Commanders' practice squad on October 22, 2024. He was released on November 6, re-signed on November 19, and was released again on December 13. He signed a futures contract with Washington on January 17, 2025. Strachan was released by the Commanders on August 14.
