= New Liberty School =

New Liberty School may refer to:

- New Liberty School (Liberty, Arkansas), listed on the National Register of Historic Places in Logan County, Arkansas
- New Liberty School (Vardaman, Mississippi), listed on the National Register of Historic Places in Calhoun County, Mississippi
