= Jonathan Falwell =

American Baptist pastor (born 1966)

- Falwell in 2025
- Born: Jonathan Pate Falwell; September 7, 1966 (age 60); Lynchburg, Virginia, U.S.
- Education: Liberty University (BS, MA); Taft Law School (JD)
- Occupations: Pastor, Thomas Road Baptist Church
- Spouse: Shari Falwell
- Children: 4
- Parent(s): Jerry Falwell Sr. Macel Pate Falwell
- Relatives: Jerry Falwell Jr. (brother)

Jonathan Pate Falwell (born September 7, 1966) is the senior pastor at the Thomas Road Baptist Church in Lynchburg, Virginia, and chancellor at Liberty University.

== Education ==
Falwell earned his Bachelor of Science degree from Liberty University in 1987, his Master of Arts degree in Religion from the Liberty Baptist Theological Seminary in 1995, and a Juris Doctor degree in 2005 from the Taft Law School in Santa Ana, California.

== Family ==
He is the son of and successor to Jerry Falwell and the younger brother of Jerry Falwell Jr. Upon Jerry Sr.'s death in 2007, Jonathan succeeded him as senior pastor of Thomas Road Baptist Church and Jerry Jr. succeeded him as president of Liberty University (2007–2020). Jonathan would become chancellor of Liberty University in 2023. Their older sister Jeannie is a surgeon.

During a 1974 family discussion about abortion as the 'national sin' of America, Jonathan asked his father why he did not do something about it, which was the start of his father's reading of other evangelical writers such as Francis Schaeffer on the issue.

== Career ==
As a young adult and minister in his father's church, Thomas Road Baptist Church, Jonathan invested in video processing technology and began overseeing the operations of the church ministry.

In April 2021 the trustees of Liberty University named Falwell as the university's pastor.

== Personal life ==
Falwell and his wife, Shari, have four children.
