= Liberty Christian Academy =

Location
- 3701 Candlers Mountain Rd; Lynchburg, Virginia; United States; 37.3605°N 79.1727°W

Information
- Type: Private; Independent; college-preparatory; Christian school
- Motto: Helping students realize their God-given Potential
- Religious affiliation: Christianity
- Denomination: Baptist
- Established: 1967
- Founder: Jerry Falwell Sr.
- Superintendent: Mark Hine
- Grades: Pre-Kindergarten–12
- Gender: co-educational
- Enrolment: 1853
- Campus: Suburban
- Colors: Red, White, Navy
- Athletics: basketball, baseball, cheerleading, cross country, football, golf, softball, soccer, swimming, tennis, track & field, volleyball, wrestling
- Athletics conference: Virginia High School League (VHSL)
- Mascot: Benny the Bulldog
- Nickname: Bulldogs
- Accreditation: Cognia; Association of Christian Schools International
- Tuition: $7,536–$8,570 (2024–25)
- Affiliation: Thomas Road Baptist Church
- Website: www.lcabulldogs.com

Liberty Christian Academy (LCA, founded as Lynchburg Christian Academy) is a private Christian school in Lynchburg, Virginia, United States. Founded in 1967 by Baptist preacher Jerry Falwell Sr. as a ministry of Thomas Road Baptist Church and a segregation academy, the school is recognized as an educational facility by the Commonwealth of Virginia through the Virginia State Board of Education, Southern Association of Colleges and Schools, and the Association of Christian Schools International. The academy consists of pre–K through grade 12.

== History ==
During the 1950s and 1960s, Falwell spoke and campaigned against civil rights movement leader Martin Luther King Jr. and the desegregation of public school systems by the U.S. federal government. In 1966, he led the effort to create "a private school for white students," the Lynchburg News reported. Named Lynchburg Christian Academy, the school opened in 1967 as a segregation academy. Falwell developed it as a ministry of his Thomas Road Baptist Church.

Unlike many other segregation academies, the school became racially integrated two years after its opening. Historian Seth Dowland said that school officials later sought to market the school to parents who were not solely motivated by a desire to keep their children out of racially integrated public schools.

In 1975, the Ford administration began trying to deny segregation academies their tax-exempt status on the basis that they perpetuated segregation. In 1979, Falwell denounced this "intervention against Christian schools", which had become a policy of the Carter administration.

In 2005, the Lynchburg Christian Academy was moved next to Liberty University and renamed Liberty Christian Academy.

== Athletics ==
The LCA football team compiled an 85–6 record, winning four state championships and eight conference championships, between 2004, when Frank Rocco become the head coach, and 2013. Among the team's former members are Rashad Jennings and Bobby Massie.

== Notable alumni ==
- Jerry Falwell Jr. (class of 1980), president of Liberty University
- Bob Good (class of 1983), politician
- Rashad Jennings (class of 2005), NFL player
- Jelena Antić (class of 2009), professional basketball player and coach
- Bobby Massie (class of 2009), NFL player
- Elijah Benton (class of 2014), NFL player
- Michael Strachan (class of 2016), NFL player
- Gideon Davidson (class of 2025), college football running back for the Clemson Tigers
