= Liberty School (Brentwood, Tennessee) =

- Formerly listed on the U.S. National Register of Historic Places
- Location: Liberty Church Rd. 1/4 mi. N of Concord Rd., Brentwood, Tennessee
- Built: 1900
- MPS: Williamson County MRA
- NRHP reference No.: 88000317

Significant dates
- Added to NRHP: 1988
- Removed from NRHP: November 15, 2006

The Liberty School was a one-room schoolhouse in Brentwood, Tennessee that was built in 1900. Along with Forest Hills School and Liberty Hill School, it was one of the three best surviving examples in Williamson County of one room schoolhouses built during 1900–1920. While most of these schools have been lost, they once provided the majority of public education in the county.

It was listed on the National Register of Historic Places in 1988, and was removed from the National Register in 2006.

The property was also known as Williamson County historic resource WM-1050.

When listed the property included one contributing building, and one contributing structure, on an area of less than 1 acre (0.40 ha).
