= Thomas Road Baptist Church =

Megachurch in Virginia, US

Coordinates: 37°21′27″N 79°10′24″W

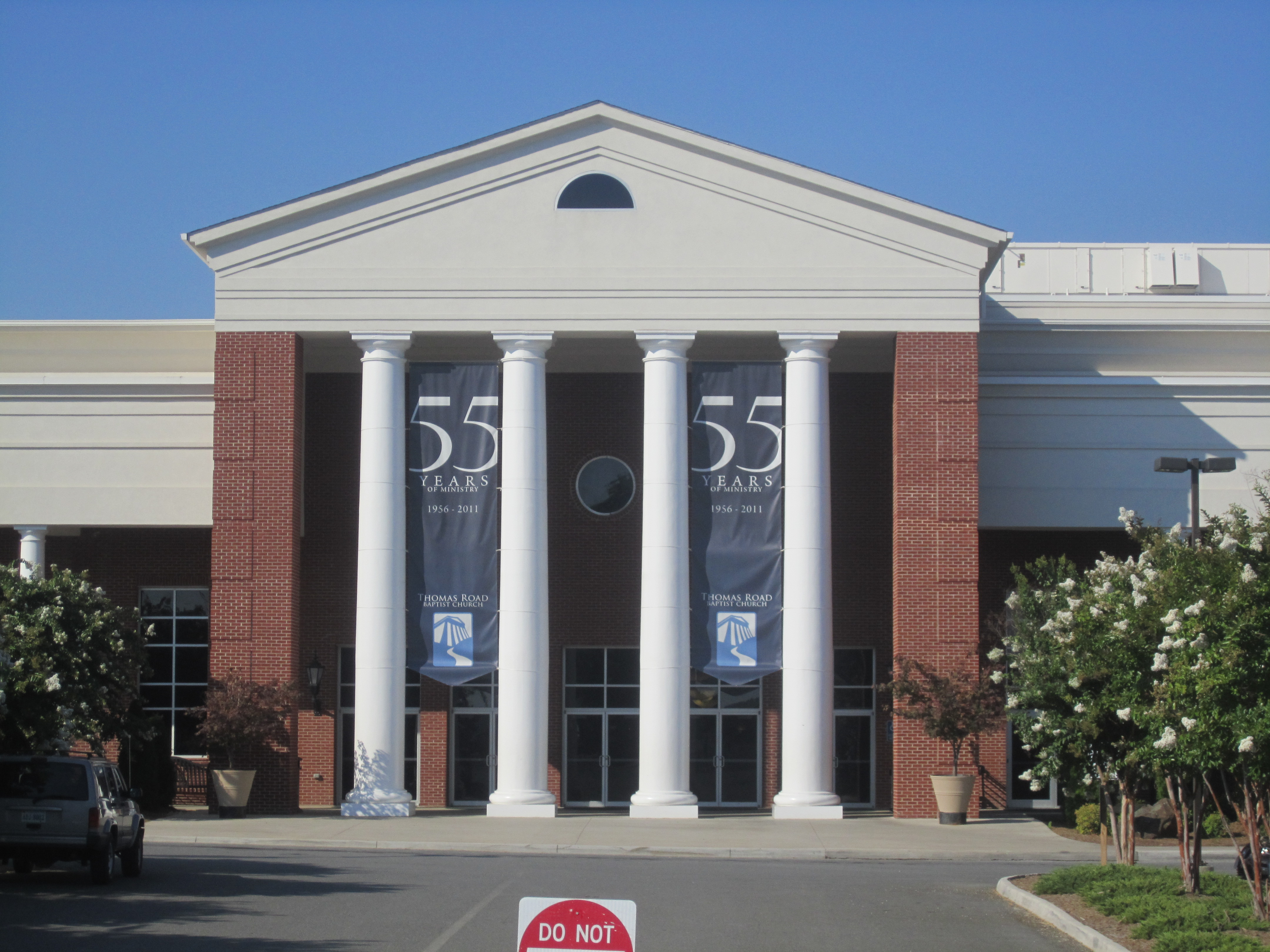
- Thomas Road Baptist Church
- Location: Lynchburg, Virginia
- Country: United States
- Denomination: Baptist
- Website: trbc.org

History
- Founded: 1956

Thomas Road Baptist Church (TRBC) is a Baptist megachurch in Lynchburg, Virginia, located on the campus of Liberty University, which it founded and is closely affiliated with. In 2016, a church spokesperson stated they had an average weekly attendance of 9,000. The pastor is Jonathan Falwell, the son of previous Senior Pastor Jerry Falwell and brother of former Liberty University President, Jerry Falwell Jr. In addition to a second campus, Dan River Church, Thomas Road also hosts a Spanish congregation on its main campus. It is affiliated with the Baptist Bible Fellowship International and the Southern Baptist Convention.

== History ==
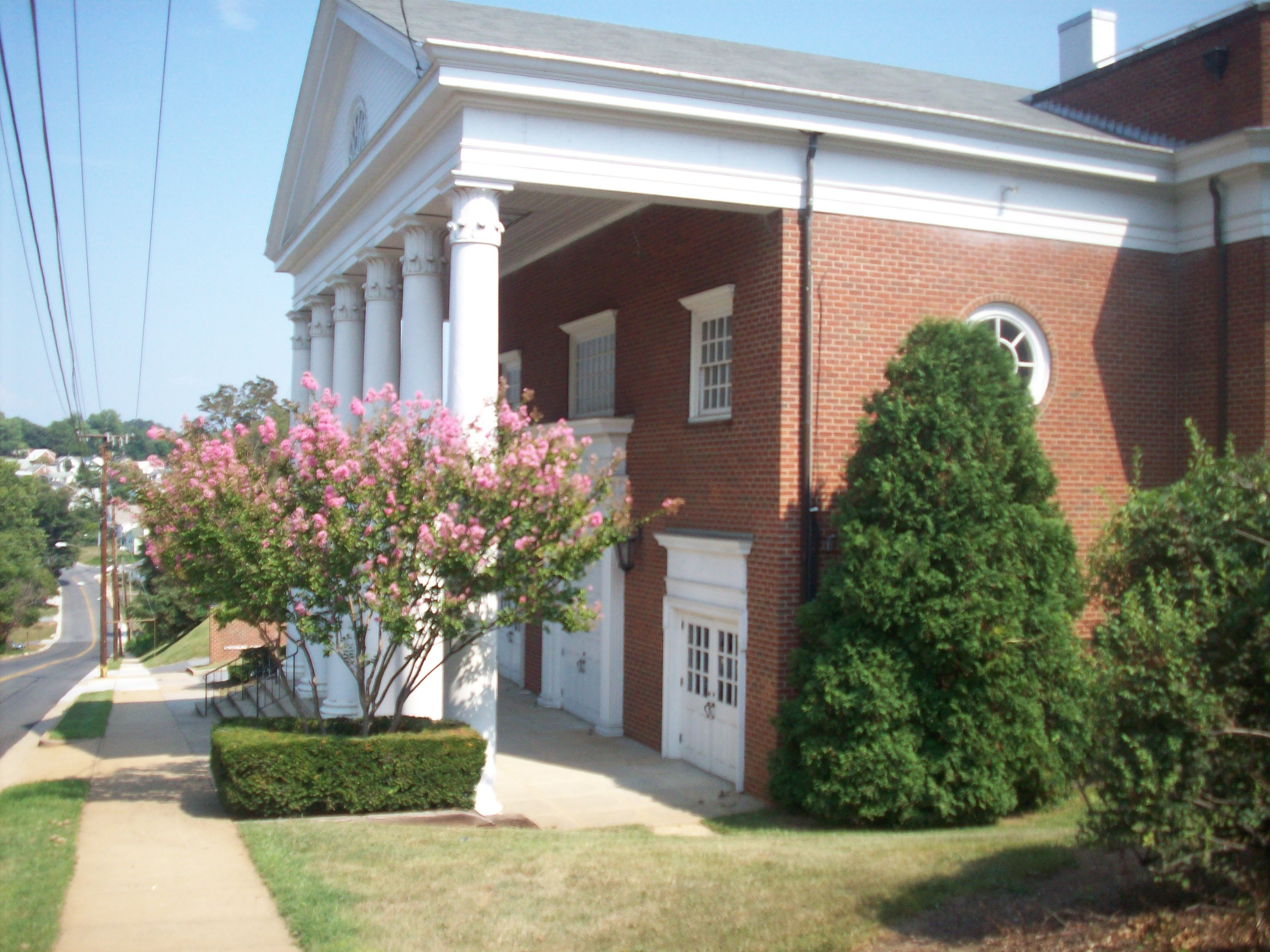
The Old Thomas Road Baptist Church (Now the Ramp Church International)

Began in 1956 by a group of thirty-five members, including Jerry Falwell, Thomas Road now claims more than 24,200 members. The first meeting of Thomas Road was held on June 17 at Mountain View Elementary School. On June 24, 1956, the church held its first service in what was the former Donald Duck Bottling Company building. In 1964, Thomas Road moved into its second auditorium that seated 1,000 people. In 1969, the church broke ground for two educational buildings plus a new 3,000-seat sanctuary. In 1971, the church founded Lynchburg Baptist College, now known as Liberty University, as well as Liberty Christian Academy in 1967 (known as Lynchburg Christian Academy until it moved and was renamed in 2005). Until 2004, the church was the location for a nationally syndicated religious broadcast known as The Old-Time Gospel Hour. This program now airs only locally in Lynchburg. Selected sermons from the pulpit of the Thomas Road Baptist Church are now featured nationally on a syndicated program from Liberty University known as Live from Liberty.

The church occupied a new multimillion-dollar facility on July 2, 2006. The new building is connected to an over 800,000 sq ft (74,000 m^{2}) facility formerly owned and operated by GE and Ericsson Mobile Communications to manufacture mobile phones and other telecommunications equipment. The existing building has been renovated to house offices, university classes, the new Liberty University School of Law, and the Liberty Christian Academy. The church offers a variety of events and speakers, such as a creationist conference by Answers in Genesis.

Founding pastor Falwell served as its senior pastor until his death on May 15, 2007. In a special business meeting called by the board of deacons on June 3, 2007, Jonathan Falwell was unanimously elected by the congregation to assume his father's duties as senior pastor of the church. Jonathan Falwell had previously served as the church's executive pastor since 1994.

== Affiliation ==
Thomas Road Baptist Church was initially affiliated with the Baptist Bible Fellowship International. However, since 1998, it has a dual affiliation with the Baptist Bible Fellowship and the Southern Baptist Convention, having entered the convention by way of the Southern Baptist Conservatives of Virginia.

== Controversies ==
Jerry Falwell started Lynchburg Baptist College by selling bonds to a small group of private investors. However, in 1972, the Securities and Exchange Commission investigated the bonds alleging Falwell's church committed "fraud and deceit" in the issuance of $6.5 million in unsecured church bonds. The church won a 1973 federal court case prosecuted at the behest of the SEC, in which the court exonerated the church and ruled that there had been no intentional wrongdoing.

In 1989, Jerry Falwell told Liberty University employees that membership in the church and tithing were mandatory.
