= Liberty School (Blue Hill, Maine) =

Coordinates: 44.40507°N 68.59547°W

Information
- Closed: 2007
- Enrollment: c.60

Liberty School was a private secondary school in Blue Hill, Maine, United States, that operated for nearly ten years.

The school had an open campus, and students were largely in control of their education. Many students were actively involved in the school’s democratic governance.

In May 2007 the school community elected a new board of trustees to increase student enrollment and improve the school finances, but it was unsuccessful. (Ellsworth American Nov. 2007 - 'Liberty School to Close in December 2007').

Liberty school closed in December 2007

== Enrollment ==
The number of students hovered around 60. There were no grades but written evaluations instead. Admittance was generally welcoming. Students and faculty collectively admitted students through the school’s admissions committee.

== Community service ==
Students were responsible for cleaning the school, including all classrooms and bathrooms. Students were required to do at least 40 hours of community service in order to graduate. Community service typically involved volunteering for a non-profit organization.

== Student activities ==
Liberty School periodically offered sports, including soccer, basketball, and Frisbee. Some after school activities included rowing, hiking, swimming, and skiing.

In spring 2005, the first ever Liberty School Film Festival was held at the Alamo Theater in Bucksport, Maine. It was a showing of student work, films from the Video Poems class, and the premiere of the DVD Yearbook as well as the print version of the Yearbook.

== Classes ==
Liberty school offered traditional math and science classes to topic generated classes as well as nontraditional classes such as the History of Jazz. Classes were often interdisciplinary.

== Sources ==
http://ellsworthamerican.com/newspaper/index.php?option=com_content&task=view&id=11033&Itemid=203%5B%5D
