= Liberty Hill School (Liberty Hill, Tennessee) =

- Formerly listed on the U.S. National Register of Historic Places
- Location within Tennessee Location within the United States
- Location: Crow Cut Rd., Liberty Hill, Williamson County, Tennessee
- Coordinates: 35°58′41″N 87°10′53″W
- Area: 1.1 acres (0.45 ha)
- Built: c. 1915
- MPS: Williamson County MRA
- NRHP reference No.: 88000315

Significant dates
- Added to NRHP: April 13, 1988
- Removed from NRHP: June 10, 2022

The Liberty Hill School at Liberty Hill, near Fairview, Tennessee, was built c. 1915. Along with Forest Hills School and Liberty School, as of 1988 it was considered one of the three best surviving examples in Williamson County of one room schoolhouses built during 1900–1920. Most of these schools, which once provided the majority of public education in the county, had been lost.

The school and a 1.1-acre (0.45 ha) property was listed on the National Register of Historic Places in 1988, at which time the school was vacant and used for hay storage. It was delisted in 2022.
