= Liberty High School (Globe, Arizona) =

Location
- 1300 E. Cedar Street; Globe, Arizona 85501; United States; 33°24′3.99″N 110°46′30.68″W

Information
- School type: Public charter high school
- Established: 1996 (30 years ago)
- CEEB code: 030009
- Director: Abigail Jennex
- Grades: 7-12
- Enrollment: 76 (2024–2025)
- Colors: Black and silver
- Mascot: Silverback
- Website: www.liberty-high.net

Liberty High School is a charter school in Globe, Arizona. It was founded in 1996 as the Gila County Transition School and gained its current name in April 2001. As of July 2014 Liberty HS expanded its services to allow for a 7th and 8th grade program.
