= Liberty Hill, Williamson County, Tennessee =

Liberty Hill, Tennessee
- Unincorporated community
- Location within Tennessee Location within the United States
- Coordinates: 35°58′53″N 87°11′00″W
- Country: United States
- State: Tennessee
- County: Williamson
- Elevation: 833 ft (254 m)
- Time zone: UTC-6 (Central (CST))
  - Summer (DST): UTC-5 (CDT)
- Area code(s): 615, 629
- GNIS feature ID: 1315394

Liberty Hill is an unincorporated community in Williamson County, Tennessee. It is the location of the Liberty Hill School, which is listed on the U.S. National Register of Historic Places.
