= Liberty Colored High School =

- U.S. National Register of Historic Places
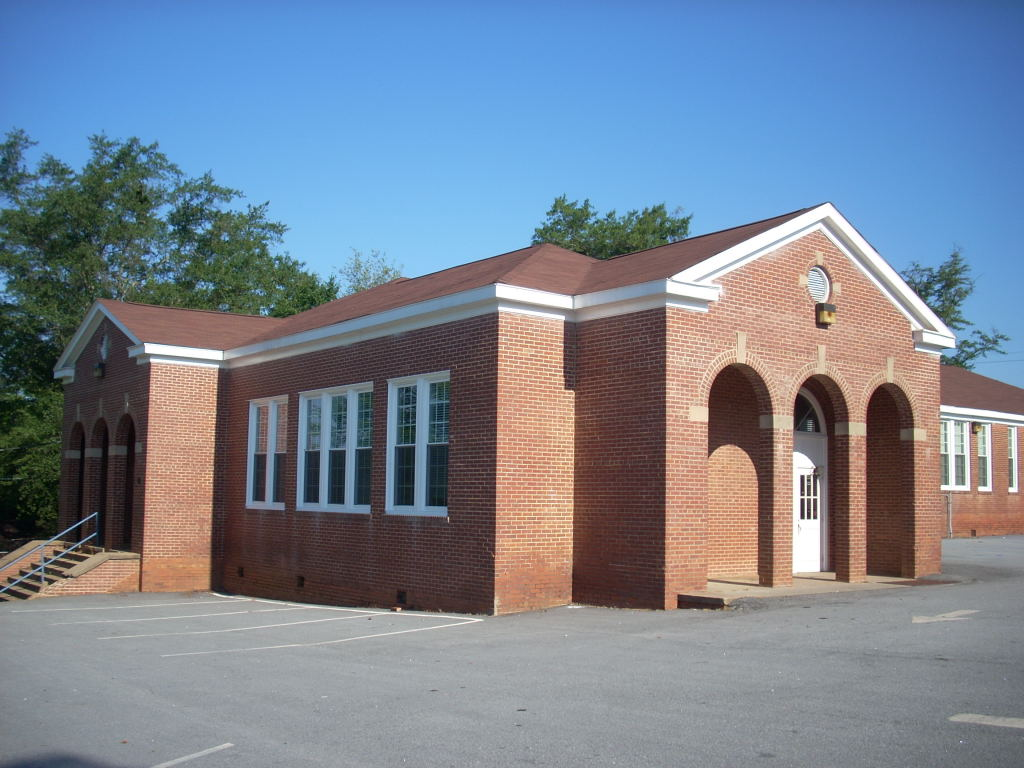
- Rosewood Center in 2009

- Location within South Carolina Location within the United States
- Location: Jct. of SC 93 and Rosewood St., Liberty, Pickens County, South Carolina, U.S.
- Coordinates: 34°47′24″N 82°41′23″W
- Area: 1.4 acres (0.57 ha)
- Built: 1937
- Architect: Works Progress Administration
- Architectural style: Late 19th And 20th Century Revivals
- NRHP reference No.: 03000270
- Added to NRHP: April 18, 2003

Liberty Colored High School is a former high school for African-American students in Liberty, South Carolina during the period of racial segregation. It originally was called Liberty Colored Junior High School. The building is now a community center known as the Rosewood Center. It is at East Main Street (South Carolina Highway 93) and Rosewood Street in Liberty. The school was built in 1937 on the site of a Rosenwald school that had burned down.

Because of its role in the education of local African-American students, it was named to the National Register of Historic Places on April 18, 2003.

== History ==
The first school for African-American students in the Liberty area began in 1899 at the New Hope Baptist Church. A year later, a wooden school was built next to the church. Around 1922, a three-teacher Rosenwald school was built on the site of the current building through funding from the parents, community, and matching funds from The Rosenwald Fund. This school burned in 1935.

The current building was built in 1937 on the same site with the assistance of the Works Progress Administration. Additional funds came from the State insurance fund and community contributions. It was named Liberty Colored Junior High School and had grades one through nine. In 1945, grades ten and eleven were added and its name was changed to Liberty Colored High School. Twelfth grade were added in the 1949. It was one of two high schools for African-American students in Pickens County. It served students in Liberty, Norris, Central, Clemson and the adjacent rural areas. In 1955, the two high schools were consolidated into Clearview Colored High School in Easley.

After the high school was moved, the school building was used as an elementary school for African-American students. It was named Rosewood Elementary School after its location on Rosewood Street. It had grades one through seven.

When the Pickens County schools were desegregated in 1970, the student body was gradually merged with Liberty Elementary School. Then it was renamed as the Rosewood Center and used by Pickens County Schools as a special education, adult, and teacher education center.

The building was sold to the City of Liberty in 2001. Although renovations on its interior began to use it as for municipal offices, the project was abandoned. In 2002, it was leased to Liberty Baptist Church for a youth activity center.

Currently, the building is used as a community center. It can be rented for parties, receptions, and other events.

== Architecture ==
The school is a one-story, brick building. It has a gabled, asphalt-shingled roof. A projecting wing has the primary entrance facing East Main Street. The entrance has three brick arches with cast key stones and imposts. There is a louvered vent above the center arch. There is a double door with fanlight transoms. There is a secondary entrance on Rosemont Street in a similar style.

The school had an auditorium, four classrooms, and offices. The auditorium stage also served as the lunchroom. Originally, the basement had separate restrooms for the boys and the girls. In the 1950s, the stairway to the basement was closed, and the corridor was converted to new restrooms.

== See also ==
- List of African-American historic places in South Carolina
- National Register of Historic Places listings in Pickens County, South Carolina
