= Little Company of Mary Hospital =

Little Company of Mary Hospital may refer to:

- Little Company of Mary Hospital (San Pedro), San Pedro, California
- Little Company of Mary Hospital (Torrance), Torrance, California
- Little Company of Mary Hospital (Evergreen Park), Evergreen Park, Illinois
- Life Groenkloof Hospital, formerly Little Company of Mary Hospital, Pretoria, South Africa
