= List of hospitals in California =

An enlargeable map of the 58 counties of the state of California

This is a list of hospitals in California (U.S. state), grouped by county and sorted by hospital name. Within California’s healthcare system, only a general acute care hospital or acute psychiatric hospital, as licensed by the California Department of Public Health, can be referred to as a "hospital." As of 2018, the CPHD Center for Health Care Quality Cal Health Find database reports 422 general acute care hospitals statewide, as well as 128 acute psychiatric hospitals.

== Alameda County ==
- Alameda Hospital – Alameda
- Alta Bates Summit Medical Center
  - Alta Bates Campus – Berkeley
  - Herrick Campus – Berkeley
  - Summit Campus – Oakland (previous merger of Providence Hospital, Peralta Hospital, and Samuel Merritt Hospital)
- Anderson Sanatorium – Oakland (closed)
- Arroyo del Valle Sanitarium – Livermore (1918–1960; closed)
- Eden Medical Center – Castro Valley
- Fabiola Hospital – Oakland (1876-1932) (donated to Samuel Merritt Hospital)
- Fairmont Rehabilitation and Wellness Center with hospital-based Skilled Nursing Facility – San Leandro
- Fremont Hospital (behavioral health facility) – Fremont
- Hayward Hospital – Hayward (closed in 1988)
- Highland Hospital – Oakland
- John George Psychiatric Pavilion – San Leandro
- Kaiser Fremont Medical Center (Kaiser Permanente) – Fremont
- Kaiser Hayward (closed in 2014)
- Kaiser Oakland Medical Center
- Kaiser San Leandro Medical Center
- Kindred Hospital - San Francisco Bay Area (LTACF) – San Leandro
- Livermore Sanitarium – Livermore (1894– 1965; closed)
- Livermore VA Hospital – Livermore
- Naval Hospital Oakland (closed 1996) – including nearby San Leandro Naval Hospital (closed 1964)
- St. Rose Hospital – Hayward
- San Leandro Hospital – San Leandro
- UCSF Benioff Children's Hospital Oakland – Oakland
- Stanford Health Care Tri-Valley – Pleasanton
- Washington Hospital – Fremont

== Amador County ==
- Sutter Amador Hospital – Jackson

== Alpine County ==
- County Hospital (Alpine County, California)

== Butte County ==
- Enloe Medical Center – Chico
- Orchard Hospital – Biggs-Gridley
- Oroville Hospital – Oroville

== Calaveras County ==
- Mark Twain St. Joseph

== Colusa County ==
- Colusa Regional Medical Center

== Contra Costa County ==
- Contra Costa Regional Medical Center – Martinez
- Doctors Medical Center – closed in 2015
- John Muir Concord Medical Center – Concord (formerly Mt. Diablo Medical Center)
- John Muir Walnut Creek Medical Center – Walnut Creek (Level II Trauma Center)
- Kaiser Martinez Medical Center – closed in 1998
- Kaiser Richmond Medical Center
- Kaiser Walnut Creek Medical Center
- Los Medanos Community Hospital
- San Ramon Regional Medical Center – San Ramon
- Sutter Delta Medical Center – Antioch

== Del Norte County ==
- Sutter Coast Hospital

== El Dorado County ==
- Barton Memorial Hospital
- Marshall Medical Center

== Fresno County ==
- Coalinga Regional Medical Center – Coalinga (closed)
- Coalinga State Hospital – Coalinga (state run psychiatric hospital)
- Clovis Community Medical Center – Clovis
- Community Regional Medical Center – Fresno
- Fresno Heart & Surgical Hospital – Fresno
- Fresno Surgical Hospital – Fresno
- Kaiser Fresno Medical Center – Fresno
- Kingsburg Medical Center – Kingsburg (closed)
- Saint Agnes Medical Center – Fresno
- San Joaquin Valley Rehabilitation Hospital
- Sanger General Hospital – Sanger (closed)
- Selma Community Hospital – Selma
- Adventist Health Reedley – Reedley

== Glenn County ==
- Glenn Medical Center – Willows

== Humboldt County ==
- Jerold Phelps Community Hospital – Garberville
- Mad River Community Hospital – Arcata
- Redwood Memorial Hospital – Fortuna
- St. Joseph Hospital – Eureka (includes the General Hospital Campus and Rehabilitation Hospital)

== Imperial County ==
- El Centro Regional Medical Center
- Pioneers Memorial Hospital

== Inyo County ==
- Northern Inyo Hospital
- Southern Inyo Hospital

== Kern County ==
- Adventist Health Bakersfield - Bakersfield
- Adventist Health Bakersfield Heart – Bakersfield
- Adventist Health Delano – Delano
- Adventist Health Tehachapi – Tehachapi
- Bakersfield Memorial Hospital – Bakersfield
- Kern Medical Center – Bakersfield
- Kern Valley – Lake Isabella
- Mercy Hospital Bakersfield (formerly named Mercy Truxton)
- Mercy Southwest – Bakersfield
- Ridgecrest Regional Hospital – Ridgecrest

== Kings County ==
- Adventist Medical Center – Hanford
- Central Valley General Hospital
- Corcoran District Hospital
- Naval Hospital Lemoore

== Lake County ==
- St. Helena Hospital Clearlake
- Sutter Lakeside Hospital

== Lassen County ==
- Banner Lassen Medical Center – Susanville

== Los Angeles County ==
=== North ===
These hospitals are located north of the 10 Freeway:

- Alhambra Hospital Medical Center – Alhambra
- Antelope Valley Hospital Medical Center – Lancaster
- Aurora Las Encinas Hospital – Pasadena
- Barlow Respiratory Hospital – Los Angeles
- California Hospital Medical Center – Los Angeles
- Cedars-Sinai Medical Center – Los Angeles and Beverly Hills
- Century City Hospital – Los Angeles (closed)
- Children's Hospital Los Angeles – Los Angeles
- City of Hope National Medical Center – Duarte
- Emanate Health/Foothill Presbyterian Hospital – Glendora
- Emanate Health/Inter-community Hospital – Covina
- Emanate Health/Queen of the Valley Hospital – West Covina
- Encino Hospital Medical Center – Encino
- Estelle Doheny Eye Hospital – Los Angeles (closed)
- Garfield Medical Center – Monterey Park
- Glendale Adventist Medical Center – Glendale
- Glendale Memorial Hospital and Health Center – Glendale
- Glendale Research Hospital – Glendale
- Glendora Community Hospital – Glendora (formerly East Valley Hospital)
- Good Samaritan Hospital – Los Angeles
- Granada Hills Community Hospital – Granada Hills (closed August 2003)
- Henry Mayo Newhall Memorial Hospital – Valencia
- Hollywood Community Hospital of Hollywood – Hollywood
- Hollywood Community Hospital of Van Nuys – Van Nuys
- Hollywood Presbyterian Medical Center – Los Angeles
- Huntington Hospital – Pasadena
- Kaiser Foundation Hospital – Chatsworth – Chatsworth
- Kaiser Foundation Hospital – Panorama City
- Kaiser Foundation Hospital – West Los Angeles
- Kaiser Foundation Hospital – Woodland Hills
- Kaiser Foundation Hospital Sunset – Los Angeles
- Keck Hospital of USC – Los Angeles (formerly USC University Hospital)
- LA Downtown Medical Center, formerly:

- City of Angels Medical Center
- Los Angeles Downtown Medical Center – Los Angeles
- Silver Lake Medical Center – Los Angeles

- Lakewood Regional Medical Center – Lakewood
- Lancaster Community Hospital – Lancaster (closed)
- Lanterman Developmental Center – Pomona
- Los Angeles Community Hospital – Los Angeles
- Los Angeles County High Desert Hospital – Lancaster (closed June 2003)
- Los Angeles County Los Amigos Medical Center
- Los Angeles General Medical Center – Los Angeles (formerly Los Angeles County+USC Medical Center)
- Los Angeles Metropolitan Medical Center – Los Angeles (closed 2013)
- Mattel Children's Hospital UCLA – Los Angeles
- Methodist Hospital of Southern California – Arcadia
- Mission Community Hospital – Panorama Campus
- Monrovia Community Hospital (closed May 2004)
- Monterey Park Hospital – Monterey Park
- Motion Picture & Television Hospital – Woodland Hills
- Northridge Hospital Medical Center – Northridge
- Northridge Hospital Medical Center, Sherman Way Campus (closed December 2004)
- Olive View-UCLA Medical Center – Sylmar
- Olympia Medical Center – Los Angeles
- Orthopaedic Hospital – Los Angeles (outpatient service only as of June 2005)
- Pacific Alliance Medical Center – Los Angeles
- Pacifica Hospital Of The Valley – Sun Valley
- Palmdale Regional Medical Center – Palmdale
- Pico Rivera Medical Center – Pico Rivera
- Pomona Valley Hospital Medical Center – Pomona
- Promise Hospital of East Los Angeles – Los Angeles
- Providence Holy Cross Medical Center – Mission Hills
- Providence St. Joseph Medical Center – Burbank
- Providence Tarzana Medical Center – Tarzana
- Resnick Neuropsychiatric Hospital at UCLA – Los Angeles
- Robert F. Kennedy Medical Center – Hawthorne (closed in 2005)
- Ronald Reagan UCLA Medical Center – Los Angeles
- St. John's Health Center – Santa Monica
- St Luke Medical Center – Sierra Madre (closed January 2002)
- St. Vincent Medical Center – Los Angeles
- San Gabriel Valley Medical Center – San Gabriel
- San Vicente Hospital
- Santa Marta Hospital (see Elastar Community Hospital (closed 2004)
- Santa Teresita Hospital – Duarte (acute care closed January 2004)
- Sherman Oaks Hospital and the Grossman Burn Center – Sherman Oaks
- Shriners Hospital – Los Angeles
- Silver Lake Medical Center, Ingleside Campus – Rosemead
- Temple Community Hospital – Los Angeles (closed 2014)
- Thompson Memorial Medical Center Hospital – Burbank (closed 1997) (formerly Burbank Community Hospital)
- UCLA Medical Center, Santa Monica – Santa Monica
- USC Kenneth Norris Jr. Cancer Hospital
- USC Verdugo Hills Hospital – Glendale
- VA Greater Los Angeles Healthcare Center (Veterans Affairs) – Los Angeles
- Valley Presbyterian Hospital – Van Nuys
- Vencor Hospital – Los Angeles – Los Angeles
- West Hills Hospital – West Hills
- West Hills Regional Medical Center – West Hills]
- West Los Angeles Memorial Hospital – Los Angeles
- West Los Angeles VA Medical Center – Los Angeles
- West Valley Hospital And Health Center – Canoga Park
- Westlake Outpatient Medical Center – Westlake Village
- Westside Hospital– Los Angeles
- White Memorial Medical Center – Los Angeles

=== South ===
These hospitals are located south of the 10 Freeway:

- Avalon Municipal Hospital
- Baldwin Park Hospital – Baldwin Park
- Bay Harbor Hospital (closed September 1999)
- Bellflower Medical Center – Bellflower
- Bellwood General Hospital – Bellflower (closed April 2003)
- Beverly Hospital – Montebello
- Broadway Community Hospital – Los Angeles (closed March 1982)
- Brotman Medical Center – Culver City
- Casa Colina Hospital For Rehab Medicine – Pomona
- Centinela Freeman Regional Medical Center, Centinela Campus – Inglewood
- Centinela Freeman Regional Medical Center, Marina Campus – Marina del Rey
- Centinela Freeman Regional Medical Center, Memorial Campus – Inglewood (closed in 2007)
- Coast Plaza Hospital – Norwalk
- College Hospital – Cerritos
- College Medical Center – Long Beach
- Community Hospital of Gardena – Gardena
- Community Hospital of Huntington Park – Huntington Park
- Community Hospital of Long Beach – Long Beach
- Daniel Freeman Memorial Hospital – Inglewood (1954–2007; closed)
- Doctors Hospital Of West Covina – West Covina
- Downey Regional Medical Center – Downey
- East Los Angeles Doctors Hospital – East Los Angeles
- Elastar Community Hospital – East Los Angeles (2004; closed)
- Emanate Health/Queen of the Valley Hospital – West Covina
- Gardens Regional Hospital & Medical Center (previously known as Tri-City Regional Medical Center)- Hawaiian Gardens
- Greater El Monte Community Hospital – South El Monte
- Harbor-UCLA Medical Center – West Carson
- Inter-Community Medical Center – West Covina
- Kaiser Foundation Hospital – Bellflower
- Kaiser Foundation Hospital – Carson
- Kaiser Foundation Hospital – Harbor City
- Kaiser Permanente Medical Center – Baldwin Park
- Lakewood Regional Medical Center
- Little Company of Mary Hospital – San Pedro
- Little Company of Mary Hospital – Torrance
- Long Beach Community Hospital – Long Beach
- Long Beach Doctors Hospital – Long Beach (closed June 1998)
- Long Beach Memorial Medical Center – Long Beach
- Los Angeles Community Hospital of Norwalk – Norwalk
- Los Angeles Metropolitan Med Center – Hawthorne Campus – Hawthorne
- Marina Del Rey Hospital – Marina Del Rey
- Martin Luther King Jr. - Harbor Hospital – Willowbrook
- Memorial Hospital Of Gardena – Gardena
- Metropolitan State Hospital (formally Norwalk State Hospital) – Norwalk
- Miller Children's Hospital – Long Beach
- Mission Hospital of Huntington Park – Huntington Park
- Morningside Hospital – Los Angeles (closed September 1980)
- Presbyterian Intercommunity Hospital
- Providence Little Company of Mary Medical Center, San Pedro Campus
- Queen of the Valley Hospital – West Covina
- Rancho Los Amigos National Rehabilitation Center – Downey (originally opened as Hollydale Medical center, closed 1988, reopened 1989)
- Rio Hondo Hospital – Downey
- Robert F. Kennedy Medical Center – Los Angeles (closed December 2004)
- St. Francis Medical Center – Lynwood
- St. Mary Medical Center – Long Beach
- San Dimas Community Hospital
- Specialty Hospital of Southern California
- Suburban Medical Center – Paramount
- Torrance Memorial Medical Center
- University Hospital – 3787 S. Vermont Avenue Los Angeles (opened before 1958, closed 1983)
- Whittier Hospital Medical Center

== Madera County ==
- Madera Community Hospital – Madera
- Valley Children’s Hospital – Madera

== Marin County ==
- Kaiser Foundation Hospital – San Rafael
- Kentfield Hospital (LTACF) (Vibra Healthcare)
- MarinHealth Medical Center (formerly called Marin General Hospital) – Greenbrae
- Novato Community Hospital

== Mariposa County ==
- John C. Fremont Hospital

== Mendocino County ==
- Adventist Health Howard Memorial (formerly Frank R. Howard Memorial Hospital) – Willits
- Adventist Health Mendocino Coast (Formerly Mendocino Coast District Hospital) – Fort Bragg
- Mendocino State Hospital – Talmage (1889–1972; closed)
- Ukiah Valley Medical Center – Ukiah

== Merced County ==
- Los Banos Community Hospital
- Mercy Medical Center Merced Community Campus
- Mercy Medical Center Merced Dominican Campus

== Modoc County ==
- Modoc Medical Center
- Surprise Valley Community Hospital

== Mono County ==
- Mammoth Hospital

== Monterey County ==
- Community Hospital of the Monterey Peninsula – Monterey
- George L. Mee Memorial Hospital – King City
- Natividad Medical Center – Salinas
- Salinas Surgery Center – Salinas
- Salinas Valley Health Medical Center – Salinas

== Napa County ==
- Adventist Health St. Helena (formerly St. Helena Hospital) – St. Helena
- Napa State Hospital – Napa
- Queen of the Valley Medical Center – Napa

== Nevada County ==
- Sierra Nevada Memorial Hospital – Grass Valley
- Tahoe Forest Hospital – Truckee

== Orange County ==
- Anaheim General Hospital – Anaheim (closed)
- Anaheim General Hospital – Buena Park (closed)
- Anaheim Regional Medical Center – Anaheim
- Brea Community Hospital – Brea (closed)
- Chapman Global Medical Center – Orange
- Children's Hospital of Orange County – Orange
- CHOC at Mission Hospital – Mission Viejo
- College Hospital Costa Mesa – Costa Mesa
- Encompass Health Rehabilitation Hospital – Tustin
- Foothill Regional Medical Center – Tustin
- Garden Grove Hospital and Medical Center – Garden Grove
- HealthBridge Children's Hospital – Orange
- Hoag Hospital – Irvine
- Hoag Hospital – Newport Beach
- Hoag Orthopedic Institute - Irvine
- Huntington Beach Hospital – Huntington Beach
- Kaiser Permanente Orange County – Anaheim
- Kaiser Permanente Orange County – Irvine
- Kindred Hospital – Brea
- Kindred Hospital – Santa Ana
- Kindred Hospital – Westminster
- La Palma Intercommunity Hospital – La Palma
- MemorialCare Saddleback Medical Center – Laguna Hills
- MemorialCare Orange Coast Medical Center – Fountain Valley
- Orange County Global Medical Center – Santa Ana
- Providence Mission Hospital – Mission Viejo
- Providence Mission Hospital – Laguna Beach
- Providence St. Joseph Hospital – Orange
- Providence St. Jude Medical Center – Fullerton
- Saddleback Memorial Medical Center – San Clemente (closed)
- South Coast Global Medical Center – Santa Ana
- University of California, Irvine Medical Center – Orange
- UCI Health - Fountain Valley – Fountain Valley
- UCI Health - Irvine – Irvine
- UCI Health - Los Alamitos – Los Alamitos
- UCI Health - Placentia Linda – Placentia
- West Anaheim Medical Center – Anaheim

== Placer County ==
- DeWitt General Hospital (1944–1945; closed and 1947–1972; closed) – former United States Army hospital during World War II and later a public hospital
- Kaiser Permanente Medical Center – Roseville
- Sutter Auburn Faith Hospital
- Sutter Roseville Medical Center

== Plumas County ==
- Eastern Plumas District Hospital
- Indian Valley Hospital
- Plumas District Hospital
- Seneca Hospital

== Riverside County ==
- Banning General Hospital – Banning (built to support the Desert Training Center, since closed)
- Corona Regional Medical Center – Corona
- Desert Regional Medical Center – Palm Springs
- Eisenhower Medical Center – Rancho Mirage
- Hemet Global Medical Center – Hemet
- Highland Springs Surgical Center – Beaumont
- Inland Valley Regional Medical Center – Wildomar
- John F. Kennedy Memorial Hospital – Indio
- Kaiser Foundation Hospital – Riverside
- Lakeside Hospital – Perris
- Loma Linda University Medical Center – Murrieta
- Menifee Global Medical Center – Menifee
- Mission Valley Medical Center – Lake Elsinore
- Moreno Valley Community Hospital – Moreno Valley
- Palo Verde Hospital – Blythe
- Parkview Community Hospital Medical Center – Riverside
- Rancho Springs Medical Center – Murrieta
- Riverside Community Hospital – Riverside
- Riverside County Regional Medical Center – Moreno Valley
- San Gorgonio Memorial Hospital – Banning
- Temecula Valley Hospital – Temecula
- Valley Plaza Doctors Hospital

== Sacramento County ==
- Kaiser Foundation Hospital – North Sacramento
- Kaiser Foundation Hospital – South Sacramento
- Mercy General Hospital
- Mercy Hospital – Folsom
- Mercy San Juan Medical Center
- Methodist Hospital of Sacramento
- Shriners Hospitals for Children Northern California
- Sierra Vista Hospital
- Sutter Medical Center, Sacramento
- University of California Davis Medical Center
- Vencor Hospital – Sacramento

== San Benito County ==
- Hazel Hawkins Memorial Hospital

== San Bernardino County ==
Receiving hospitals (with emergency department):

- Arrowhead Regional Medical Center – Colton
- Barstow Community Hospital – Barstow
- Bear Valley Community Hospital – Big Bear Lake
- Chino Valley Medical Center – Chino
- Colorado River Medical Center – Needles
- Community Hospital of San Bernardino – San Bernardino
- Desert Valley Hospital – Victorville
- Doctor's Hospital Montclair Medical Center – Montclair
- Hi-Desert Medical Center – Joshua Tree
- Kaiser Foundation Hospital – Fontana
- Kaiser Foundation Hospital – Ontario
- Loma Linda University Children's Hospital – Loma Linda (On LLUMC campus)
- Loma Linda University Medical Center – Loma Linda
- Loma Linda University Medical Center-East – Loma Linda
- Loma Linda Veterans Affairs Medical Center – Loma Linda
- Mountains Community Hospital – Lake Arrowhead
- Redlands Community Hospital – Redlands
- St. Bernardine Medical Center – San Bernardino
- St. Mary Regional Medical Center – Apple Valley
- San Antonio Community Hospital – Upland
- Victor Valley Hospital – Victorville

Non-receiving hospitals (without emergency department):

- Canyon Ridge Hospital (acute psychiatric hospital) – Chino
- Patton State Hospital – San Bernardino
- Robert H. Ballard Rehabilitation Hospital – San Bernardino
- Vencor Hospital – Ontario

== San Diego County ==
- Alvarado Hospital Medical Center – San Diego
- Children's Hospital and Health Center – San Diego
- Children's Hospital of San Diego – San Diego
- Jacobs Medical Center – La Jolla
- Kaiser Hospital Zion – San Diego
- Kaiser Permanente Medical Center – San Diego
- Kindred Hospital – San Diego
- Naval Medical Center San Diego – San Diego
- Palomar Medical Center – Escondido
- Paradise Valley Hospital – National City
- Pomerado Hospital – Poway
- Rady Children's Hospital
- San Diego County Psychiatric Hospital – San Diego
- San Luis Rey Hospital – Encinitas
- Scripps Green Hospital – La Jolla
- Scripps Memorial Hospital – Encinitas
- Scripps Memorial Hospital – La Jolla
- Scripps Mercy Hospital – Chula Vista
- Scripps Mercy Hospital – San Diego
- Sharp Chula Vista Medical Center – Chula Vista
- Sharp Coronado Hospital – Coronado
- Sharp Grossmont Hospital – La Mesa
- Sharp Mary Birch Hospital for Women – San Diego
- Sharp Memorial Hospital – San Diego
- Sharp Mesa Vista – San Diego
- Tri-City Medical Center – Oceanside
- UC San Diego Medical Center, Hillcrest – San Diego
- U.S. Naval Hospital (Camp Pendleton) – Camp Pendleton
- Veterans Affairs Medical Center San Diego – La Jolla

== San Francisco County ==
- Almshouse San Francisco (closed) – later became the location of Laguna Honda Hospital
- Green Ophthalmic Institute (Green's Eye Hospital; Green Eye Hospital) (closed) – later became the location of BackPax Medical Center
- Kaiser Permanente Kaiser San Francisco Medical Center
  - San Francisco Medical Center
  - San Francisco French Hospital
  - Geary Hospital
  - Mission Bay
- Kentfield Hospital San Francisco (LTACF) (Vibra Healthcare) – located on 6th floor of St. Mary's Medical Center
- Letterman Army Hospital
- Lick Old Ladies' Home, University Mound
- Pacific Dispensary for Women and Children
- Park Sanitarium (formally the Scobie Memorial Sanitarium; closed)
- Public Health Service Hospital (1912–1981; closed)
- San Francisco Chinese Hospital
- San Francisco Department of Public Health
  - Laguna Honda Hospital (SFDPH)
  - San Francisco General Hospital
- San Francisco Marine Hospital (1853– 1912; closed) – renamed as a United States Public Health Service Hospital
- San Francisco VA Medical Center, Fort Miley Military Reservation
- St. Joseph's Hospital, Buena Vista (1928–1979; closed)
- Shriner's Hospital of San Francisco
- Southern Pacific Hospital, 333 Baker Street
- Sutter California Pacific Medical Center
  - Davies campus Davies Medical Center, formerly Franklin Hospital
  - Mission Bernal campus St. Luke's Hospital (San Francisco, California)
  - Van Ness campus
- UCSF Medical Center
  - UCSF Bakar Cancer Hospital
  - UCSF Benioff Children's Hospital
  - UCSF Betty Irene Moore Women's Hospital
  - UCSF Health Hyde Hospital (formerly UCSF Health Saint Francis Hospital, Saint Francis Memorial Hospital)
  - UCSF Health Stanyan Hospital (formerly UCSF Health St. Mary's Hospital, St. Mary's Medical Center)
  - UCSF Helen Diller Family Comprehensive Cancer Center
  - University of California, San Francisco Fetal Treatment Center
  - Langley Porter Psychiatric Hospital
  - Mission Bay campus
  - Mount Zion campus
  - Parnassus campus

== San Joaquin County ==
- Dameron Hospital – Stockton
- Doctors Hospital of Manteca – Manteca
- Kaiser Manteca Medical Center – Manteca
- Lodi Memorial Hospital – Lodi
- St. Joseph's Medical Center – Stockton
- San Joaquin General Hospital – French Camp
- Stockton State Hospital (1851–1996; closed) – the first psychiatric hospital in California
- Sutter Tracy Community Hospital – Tracy

== San Luis Obispo County ==
- Arroyo Grande Community Hospital – Arroyo Grande
- Atascadero State Hospital – Atascadero
- French Hospital Medical Center – San Luis Obispo
- San Luis Obispo General Hospital (closed June 2003)
- Adventist Health Sierra Vista – San Luis Obispo
- Adventist Health Twin Cities – Templeton

== San Mateo County ==
- Gardner Sanitarium (1900– 1922; closed) – Ralston Hall, Belmont
- Hassler Health Farm – San Carlos (closed 1972)
- Kaiser Foundation Hospital – Redwood City
- Kaiser South San Francisco Medical Center – South San Francisco
- Menlo Park Surgical Hospital – Menlo Park
- Menlo Park VA Hospital – Menlo Park
- Mills-Peninsula Medical Center – Burlingame
- San Mateo Medical Center – San Mateo
- Sequoia Hospital – Redwood City
- Seton Medical Center – Coastside – Moss Beach
- Seton Medical Center – Daly City

== Santa Barbara County ==
- Cottage Children's Hospital – Santa Barbara
- Goleta Valley Cottage Hospital – Santa Barbara
- Lompoc Valley Medical Center – Lompoc
- Marian Regional Medical Center – Santa Maria
- Saint Francis Medical Center (1908–2003; closed) – Santa Barbara
- Santa Barbara Cottage Hospital – Santa Barbara
- Santa Ynez Valley Cottage Hospital – Solvang

== Santa Clara County ==
- CHoNC Pediatric Hospital – Campbell
- El Camino Hospital
  - Los Gatos campus (formerly Community Hospital of Los Gatos)
  - Mountain View campus
- Good Samaritan Hospital – San Jose
- Kaiser Permanente Santa Clara Medical Center – Santa Clara
- Kaiser Permanente Santa Teresa Medical Center – San Jose
- Lucile Salter Packard Children's Hospital at Stanford – Palo Alto
- O'Connor Hospital – San Jose
- Regional Medical Center of San Jose – San Jose
- Saint Louise Regional Hospital – Gilroy
- Santa Clara Valley Medical Center – San Jose
- Stanford University Medical Center – Stanford
- VA Palo Alto Hospital – Palo Alto

== Santa Cruz County ==
- Dominican Hospital – Santa Cruz
- Sutter Maternity and Surgery Hospital – Santa Cruz
- Watsonville Community Hospital– Watsonville

== Shasta County ==
- Mayers Memorial Hospital District – Fall River Mills
- Mercy Medical Center – Redding
- Shasta Regional Medical Center – Redding

== Sierra County ==
- None

== Siskiyou County ==
- Fairchild Medical Center – Yreka
- Mercy Medical Center – Mount Shasta

== Solano County ==
- Adventist Health Vallejo – Vallejo (formerly California Specialty Hospital; St. Helena Center For Behavioral Health)
- David Grant USAF Medical Center – Travis Air Force Base
- Kaiser Permanente Medical Center – Vacaville (Level II Trauma Center)
- Kaiser Permanente Medical Center – Vallejo
- NorthBay Medical Center – Fairfield
- NorthBay VacaValley Hospital – Vacaville
- Sutter Solano Medical Center – Vallejo

== Sonoma County ==
- Healdsburg District Hospital – Healdsburg
- Kaiser Permanente Medical Center Santa Rosa – Santa Rosa
- Petaluma Valley Hospital – Petaluma
- Santa Rosa Memorial Hospital – Santa Rosa (Level II Trauma Center)
- Sonoma Developmental Center – Eldridge, opened 1891, the oldest facility in California established specifically for serving the needs of those with developmental disabilities.
- Sonoma Speciality Hospital (LTACF) (formerly Sonoma West Medical Center and Palm Drive Hospital) – Sebastopol
- Sonoma Valley Hospital – Sonoma
- Sutter Medical Center of Santa Rosa – Santa Rosa

== Stanislaus County ==
- Doctors Medical Center of Modesto – Modesto
- Emanuel Medical Center – Turlock
- Hammond General Hospital (1942–1946; closed) – a United States Army hospital during World War II
- Kaiser Medical Center – Modesto
- Memorial Medical Center – Modesto
- Modesto State Hospital (1946–1972; closed)
- Oak Valley Hospital – Oakdale

== Sutter County ==
- Fremont Memorial Hospital – Yuba City (closed 2015)
- Sutter Surgical Hospital North Valley - Yuba City

== Tehama County ==
- Saint Elizabeth Community Hospital – Red Bluff

== Trinity County ==
- Mountain Community Medical Services – Weaverville

== Tulare County ==
- Adventist Health Tulare – Tulare
- Kaweah Delta Medical Center – Visalia
- Porterville Developmental Center – Porterville
- Sierra View District Hospital – Porterville

== Tuolumne County ==
- Sonora Regional Medical Center – Sonora

== Ventura County ==
- Adventist Health Simi Valley – Simi Valley (Formerly Simi Valley Hospital)
- Camarillo State Mental Hospital – Camarillo (1933–1997; closed)
- Community Memorial Hospital of San Buenaventura – Ventura
- Los Robles Hospital & Medical Center – Thousand Oaks
- Ojai Valley Community Hospital – Ojai
- St. John's Hospital Camarillo – Camarillo
- St. John's Regional Medical Center – Oxnard
- Santa Paula Hospital – Santa Paula
- SHC Specialty Hospital – Westlake Village (closed)
- Ventura County Medical Center – Ventura

== Yolo County ==
- Sutter Davis Hospital – Davis
- Woodland Memorial Hospital – Woodland

== Yuba County ==
- Adventist Health and Rideout – Marysville
