= Torney General Hospital =

Torney General Hospital now Desert Regional Medical Center
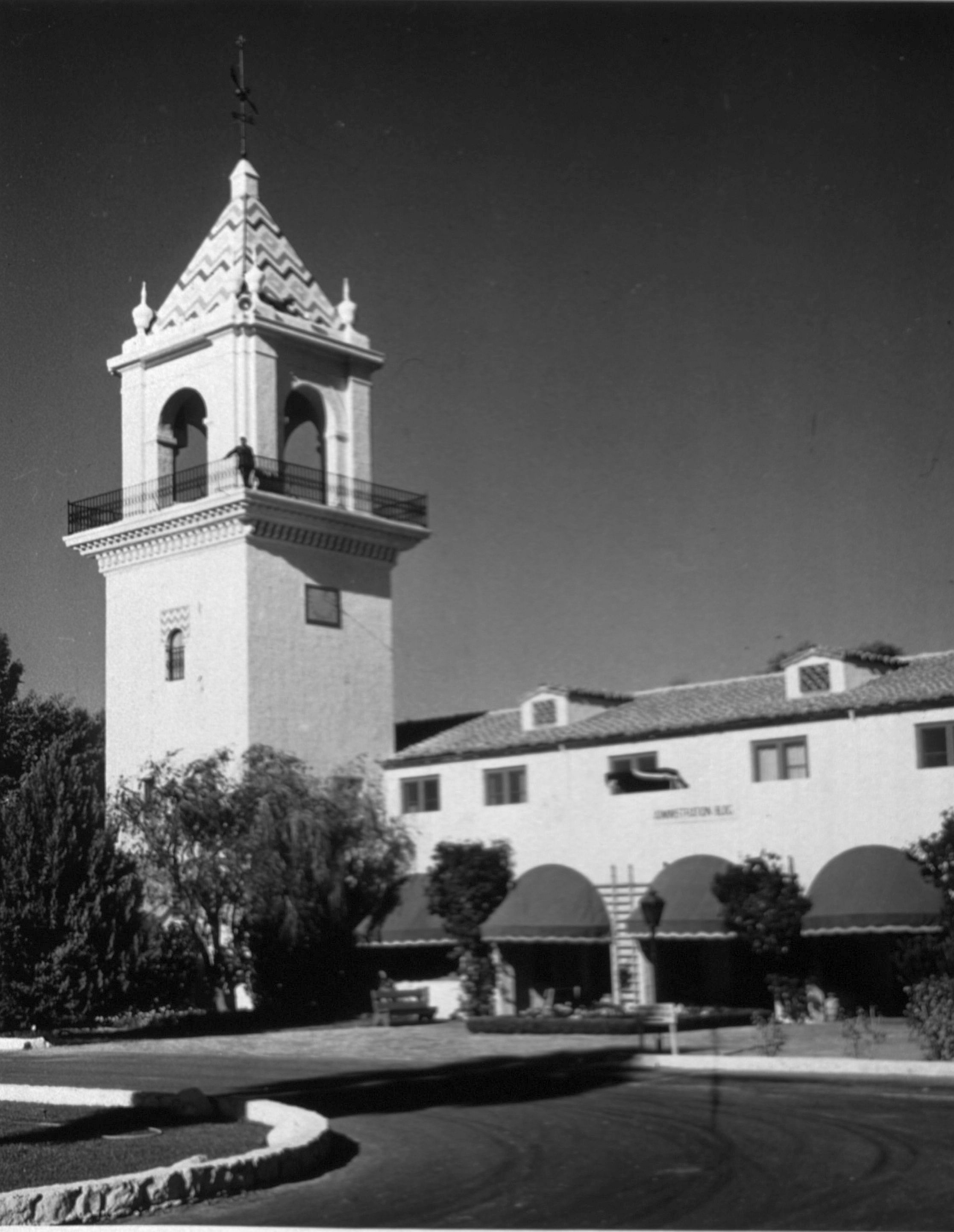
- Torney General Hospital in 1943, now the Desert Regional Medical Center with the El Mirador Tower

- Location within California
- 33°50′20″N 116°32′42″W
- Location: Palm Springs, California

History
- Built: 1942

Site notes
- Governing body: https://desertregionalgme.com/

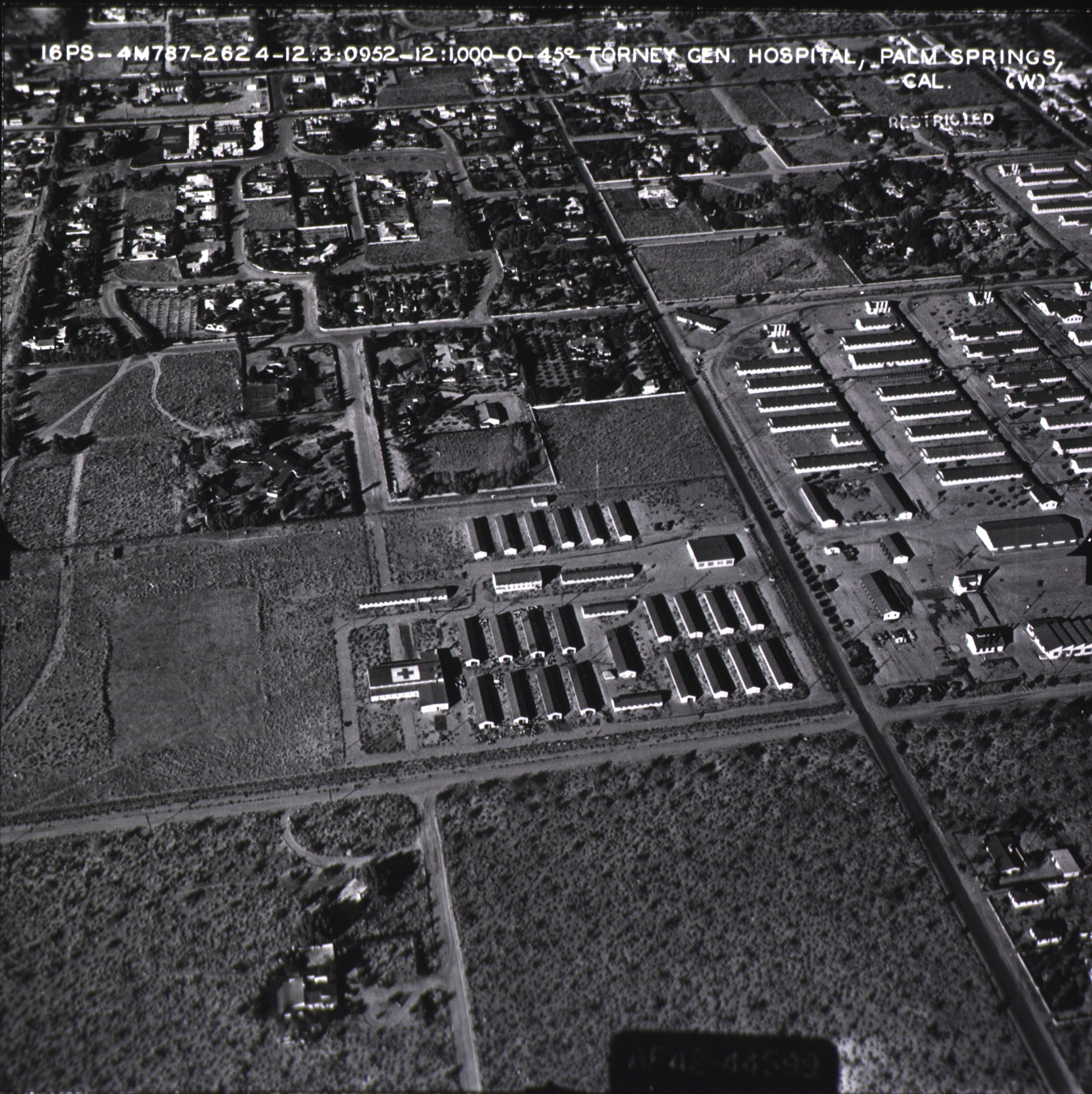
Torney General Hospital in 1943

Torney General Hospital was a US Army Hospital in Palm Springs, California, in Riverside County used during World War II. Parts of Torney General Hospital are now the Desert Regional Medical Center.

In November 1945 Torney General Hospital was closed and the Federal Works Administration sold the site. The Torney General Hospital became the Palm Springs Desert Hospital and the Palm Springs Desert Medical Plaza. The hospital is now called the Desert Regional Medical Center. The El Mirador Tower is still a landmark at the entrance to the hospital.

== History ==
=== El Mirador Hotel ===
The El Mirador Hotel opened on December 31, 1927, as 20 acres Desert Resort. The hotel was built by Prescott Thresher Stevens and the Los Angeles architect firm of Walker & Eisen. El Mirador Hotel was a busy spot visited by Hollywood stars and the wealthy. At the 1928 opening were: Douglas Fairbanks, Mary Pickford and Lillian Gish. The hotel had an open policy, frequent guests were the Marx Brothers, Al Jolson and Albert Einstein. The hotel had a Spanish-Colonial Revival-style bell tower, 200 rooms, tennis courts, Olympic swimming pool, horse stables, and a golf course. El Mirador is Spanish for watchtower. The 120-acre golf course was California's first desert golf course. Stevens built the hotel at a cost of one million dollars. The good times at the hotel ended with the Wall Street Crash on October 24, 1929. Stevens sold the hotel at loss for $300,000 in 1932. Purchased by bondholders Tony Burke and Frank Bogert, the new owners publicized Palm Springs and the hotel as an international playground. The Amos 'n' Andy show was broadcast from the hotel in the early 1930s.

=== Torney General Hospital ===
The US Army purchased the El Mirador Hotel in July 1942 and rebuilt the 139-acre complex as a 1600-bed general hospital. A year later, in 1943, the Army transferred the hospital to the Army Air Forces. Torney General Hospital was named after George H. Torney (1850–1913), physician in the United States Navy and Army who served as the 21st Surgeon General of the United States Army. Torney General Hospital was used for general medicine, with specialized care for rheumatic fever, general surgery and orthopedic surgery. The hospital supported the Desert Training Center, other California training camps, and troops returning home from overseas. With a shortage of manpower, 250 men with the Italian Service Unit worked at the hospital. A Women's Army Corps Detachment also worked at the hospital. Units stationed at Torney General Hospital during World War II included:

- 22 Army Service Forces General Hospital
- 737th and 742nd Sanitation Companies (Medical)(Colored)
- 1976th Service Command Unit (Station Complement)
- Italian Service Unit 1967th Service Command Unit from Camp Haan, Prisoner of War Branch Camp near Riverside, California.

In 1951, the National Hotel Enterprises purchased the buildings not used for the Palm Springs Desert Hospital. National Hotel Enterprises modernized the hotel and it opened again on December 13, 1952. In the 1960s it became a Hilton hotel and KMIR-TV NBC opened a studio there. In 1972 Desert Hospital next to the hotel purchased the hotel and expanded the hospital.

=== Desert Regional Medical Center ===
Desert Regional Medical Center is a 385-bed General Hospital located at 1150 N. Indian Canyon Drive, Palm Springs. It opened in 1948 and is currently operated by Tenet Healthcare. It has an emergency room and a Level I trauma center that serves the Coachella Valley, General Medicine Care and specialized care for: Digestive Disorders, Heart Care, Lab Services, Minimally Invasive Procedures, Rehabilitation Services, Respiratory, Weight Loss Surgery, Women's Health, Maternity and Neonatal intensive care unit. There are 300 physicians on staff covering over 40 different specialties. The medical offices there are called the Desert Regional Medical Center campus, and is part of the Desert Care Network that includes: John F. Kennedy Memorial Hospital in Indio, California, Hi-Desert Medical Center in Joshua Tree, California. Desert Care Network also includes: Medpost Urgent Care centers in Indio, La Quinta, California and Palm Desert, California and primary & specialty Care offices in the Coachella Valley.

== Present features ==
=== Desert Healthcare Park ===
Desert Healthcare Park also called Wellness Park was built in 1948 on the former Torney General Hospital land. The City of Palm Springs, the Desert Water Agency, and Palm Springs Unified School District have helped to build the park. The park is maintained by the non-profit group, Desert Healthcare Foundation. The five-acre public park at 1140 N. Indian Canyon Drive in Palm Springs has:

- Interactive gardens
- Quarter-mile walking/jogging loop with drinking fountains and benches
- Five exercise/fitness stations
- Gardens
- Meditation spots
- Memorial
- Fragrance garden
- Bubbling fountain
- Butterfly and hummingbird garden

=== Ruth Hardy Park ===
The city-owned 22-acre Ruth Hardy Park was built in 1948 on the former Torney General Hospital land. It is located at 700 Tamarisk Road.

=== El Mirador Tower ===
The El Mirador Tower is a Moroccan-Spanish style landmark in Palm Springs since the hotel was built in 1927. In the early days the El Mirador Tower had a broadcast radio studio – some Amos 'n' Andy shows were done in the tower. The original tower was destroyed on July 25, 1989, in a fire that started just after midnight. In 1991 a new tower that looks just like the original tower was built.

== See also ==
- List of hospitals in California
- California during World War II
