= Rick Zumwalt (American football) =

American football player (born 1965)

No. 59
- Position: outside linebacker

Personal information
- Born: May 19, 1965 (age 61); Torrance, California
- Listed height: 6 ft 3 in (1.91 m)
- Listed weight: 230 lb (104 kg)

Career information
- High school: Edison High School
- College: Golden West Junior College, Arizona State University
- NFL draft: 1988: undrafted

Career history
- Atlanta Falcons (1988)*; Los Angeles Raiders (1989)*; Sacramento Surge (1991)
- * Offseason or practice squad member only

Awards and highlights
- 1987 Rose Bowl Champion

Career NFL statistics
- Professional league: (WLAF)
- Games played: 10
- Games started: 4
- Sacks: 1

Richard D. Zumwalt (born May 19, 1965) was a defensive linebacker for the Sacramento Surge of the World League of American Football which later became known as NFL Europe.

== College career ==
Rick played college football at Golden West Junior College from 1983 to 1985 before transferring to Arizona State University, where he played from 1986 to 1987. He was part of the ASU Sun Devil football team that won the 1987 Rose Bowl by upending the favored Michigan Wolverines.

== Professional career ==
Rick went undrafted in the 1988 NFL draft but was picked up as a free agent by the Atlanta Falcons and then the Los Angeles Raiders. He was a preseason player only as he did not make the regular season rosters of either squad. When the WLAF formed, Rick was signed by the Sacramento Surge and played 10 games with the team in 1991.

== Personal life ==
After leaving football, Rick was a community college professor, counselor, and coach at Golden West College, Santa Ana College, and Orange Coast College. He then worked as a therapist and professor at College Hospital and later worked for the Huntington Beach Police Department in various job assignments. Zumwalt has earned multiple post secondary degrees and is a licensed neuropsychologist specializing in brain related disorders and works for the Premier Group as well as with the Southern California Neuropsychology Group.

Zumwalt's older son, Jordan, played college football for UCLA before being drafted in the sixth round of the 2014 NFL draft by the Pittsburgh Steelers. He spent the next two years on the injured reserve list before being cut in 2016. Rick’s younger son Erick also played college football for the UCLA Bruins.
