= Solomon H. Snyder =

American neuroscientist (born 1938)

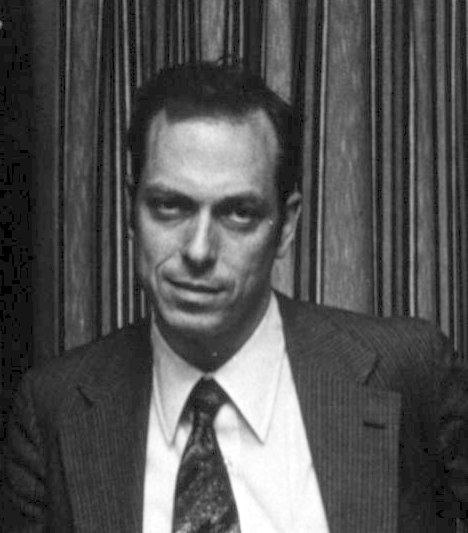
- in 1979
- Born: December 26, 1938 (age 87); Washington D.C
- Education: Georgetown University
- Awards: Albert Lasker Award for Basic Medical Research, National Medal of Science, Wolf Prize in Medicine (1982)
- Scientific career
- Fields: Neuroscientist; Psychiatrist
- Doctoral advisor: Julius Axelrod

Solomon Halbert Snyder (born December 26, 1938) is an American neuroscientist who has made wide-ranging contributions to neuropharmacology and neurochemistry. He studied at Georgetown University, and has conducted the majority of his research at the Johns Hopkins School of Medicine. Many advances in molecular neuroscience have stemmed from Snyder's identification of receptors for neurotransmitters and drugs, and elucidation of the actions of psychotropic agents. He received the Albert Lasker Award for Basic Medical Research in 1978 for his research on the opioid receptor, and is one of the most highly cited researchers in the biological and biomedical sciences, with the highest h-index in those fields for the years 1983–2002, and then from 2007 to 2019.

== Biography ==
=== Personal life ===
Solomon Snyder was born on December 26, 1938, in Washington D.C. He is one of five children. Snyder and his wife Elaine, who died in 2016, have two daughters and three grandchildren. He lives in Baltimore, Maryland.

=== Education and early career ===
Snyder attended Georgetown University from 1955 to 1958 and received his M.D. degree from Georgetown University School of Medicine in 1962. After a medical residency at the Kaiser Hospital in San Francisco, he served as a research associate from 1963 to 1965 at the National Institutes of Health, where he studied under Julius Axelrod. Snyder moved to the Johns Hopkins University School of Medicine to complete his residency in psychiatry from 1965 to 1968. He was appointed to the faculty there in 1966 as Assistant Professor of Pharmacology. In 1968 he was promoted to associate professor of Pharmacology and Psychiatry and in 1970 to full professor in both departments.

His laboratory is noted for the use of receptor binding studies to characterize the actions of neurotransmitters and psychoactive drugs.

He is also known for his work identifying receptors for the major neurotransmitters in the brain, and in the process explaining the actions of psychoactive drugs, such as the blockade of dopamine receptors by antipsychotic medications. He has described novel neurotransmitters, such as the gases nitric oxide and carbon monoxide and the D-isomers of amino acids, including D-serine.

=== Later career ===
Snyder was University Distinguished Service Professor of Neuroscience, Pharmacology, and Psychiatry at the Johns Hopkins University School of Medicine. In 1980, he founded the Department of Neuroscience, and served as its first director from 1980 to 2006. In 2006, the department was renamed as The Solomon H. Snyder Department of Neuroscience in his honor. Snyder retired from Johns Hopkins in December 2022.

Snyder is also the Director of Drug Discovery at the Lieber Institute for Brain Development in Baltimore, MD.

In 1980, he served as the president of the Society for Neuroscience. He is also associate editor, Proceedings of the National Academy of Sciences of the United States of America. He helped start the companies Nova Pharmaceuticals and Guilford Pharmaceuticals.

He is listed by the Institute for Scientific Information as one of the 10 most-often cited biologists and he also has the highest h-index of any living biologist.

== Awards ==
- Albert Lasker Award for Basic Medical Research (1978): In 1973, he co-discovered the opioid receptor and later identified the existence of normally occurring opiate-like peptides in the brain.
- Wolf Prize (from the President of Israel) (1983)
- Golden Plate Award of the American Academy of Achievement (1986)
- Bower Award of the Franklin Institute (1992)
- National Medal of Science (2003)
- Perl-UNC Prize (2006)
- Albany Medical Center Prize in Medicine and Biomedical Research (2007)
- NAS Award in the Neurosciences (2013)
- He is the recipient of nine honorary doctorates and has been elected to honorific societies including the US National Academy of Sciences, the American Academy of Arts and Sciences, and the American Philosophical Society.
