= Lancaster Community Hospital =

Coordinates: 34.6792°N 118.1476°W

- Universal Health Services

Geography
- Location: Lancaster, California, United States

Organization
- Care system: Private
- Type: Community
- Affiliated university: None

Services
- Emergency department: Basic
- Beds: 117

History
- Opened: 1975
- Closed: 2010

Links
- Website: http://www.lancastercommunityhospital.net/
- Lists: Hospitals in California

Lancaster Community Hospital (LCH) was a private hospital located in Lancaster, California. It was closed after the opening of Palmdale Regional Medical Center.
