= Arroyo Grande Community Hospital =

- Dignity Health

Geography
- Location: Arroyo Grande, California, United States
- Coordinates: 35.11345°N 120.59084°W

Organization
- Care system: Private, Medicare, Medicaid
- Type: Community

Services
- Emergency department: Basic, Physician On Duty
- Beds: 67

History
- Founded: 1961

Links
- Website: www.dignityhealth.org/arroyo-grande/
- Lists: Hospitals in California

Arroyo Grande Community Hospital is a hospital in Arroyo Grande, California, United States. It is part of the Dignity Health system.

== History ==
Arroyo Grande Community Hospital (AGCH) was founded in 1961 and has been operated by several different owners. In 1992, the facility was purchases by Vista Hospital System, a non-profit California based healthcare system. Vista operated the facility until 2003 when it entered bankruptcy and sold AGCH, along with French Hospital Medical Center and Corona Regional Medical Center, to for-profit Universal Health Services in a $120,600,000 transaction. Operations under UHS were short-lived however, when UHS soon after sold AGCH and French Hospital Medical Center to Catholic Healthcare West in early 2004 for $32.5 million.

== Hospital rating data ==
The HealthGrades website contains the latest quality data for Arroyo Grande Community Hospital, as of 2015. For this rating section three different types of data from HealthGrades are presented: quality ratings for eleven inpatient conditions and procedures, twelve patient safety indicators, percentage of patients giving the hospital a 9 or 10 (the two highest possible ratings).

For inpatient conditions and procedures, there are three possible ratings: worse than expected, as expected, better than expected. For Arroyo Grande the data for this category is:

- Worse than expected - 1
- As expected - 9
- Better than expected - 1

For patient safety indicators, there are the same three possible ratings. For this hospital four indicators were rated as:

- Worse than expected - 1
- As expected - 9
- Better than expected - 2

Data for patients giving this hospital a 9 or 10 are:

- Patients rating this hospital as a 9 or 10 - 58%
- Patients rating hospitals as a 9 or 10 nationally - 69%

== See also ==
- List of hospitals in California
