= Mission Hospital (Mission Viejo, California) =

Providence Mission Hospital
- Providence St. Joseph Health

Geography
- Location: Mission Viejo, California, United States
- Coordinates: 33.560525°N 117.664782°W

Organization
- Care system: Non-profit
- Type: Community Hospital

Services
- Emergency department: Level II trauma center
- Beds: 523

History
- Opened: August 11, 1971

Links
- Website: www.providence.org/locations/mission-hospital-mission-viejo
- Lists: Hospitals in California

Providence Mission Hospital is a 523-bed acute care regional medical center in Orange County, California with two campuses - one in Mission Viejo, and the second in Laguna Beach. The hospital has designated adult and pediatric Level II Trauma centers in the state of California. Mission Hospital provides cardiovascular, neuroscience and spine, orthopedics, cancer care, women's services, mental health, wellness and a variety of other specialty services. Mission Hospital in Laguna Beach (MHLB) provides South Orange County coastal communities with 24-hour emergency and intensive care as well as medical-surgical/telemetry services, orthopedics and also general and GI surgery. CHOC Children's at Mission Hospital is a 48-bed facility that is the area's only dedicated pediatric hospital. Mission Hospital is one of only 3 Hospitals in Orange County rated as a Regional Trauma Center.

== History ==
Mission Hospital opened on August 11, 1971, with 124 patient beds, 330 employees and a medical staff of 41 physicians providing general acute care, including obstetrics, pediatrics, surgery, intensive care and emergency services. Mission Hospital is run by the non-profit Sisters of St. Joseph of Orange, California, through their Ministry.

- In 1973, 89 new beds were added to accommodate growing demand. It became a designated paramedic base station.
- In 1974, cardiac rehabilitation opened.
- In 1976, a helipad opened.
- In 1977, oncology services became available.
- In 1980, it became one of the six original Orange County hospitals designated as a regional trauma center.
- In 1981, the Oncology Care Unit opened.
- In 1988, the Heart Surgery and Angioplasty program was introduced. The Mission Medical Tower and the Center for Rehab/Sports/Wellness opened along with a new four-level parking structure linking the upper and lower medical campuses and hospital services.
- In 1989, the Foundation at Mission Hospital Regional Medical Center was established to support community health education, medical staff research and programs to benefit the community. Also, the Pediatric Intensive Care Unit opened, and the Neonatal Intensive Care Unit was upgraded to a Level II program.
- In 1992, the five-story patient tower opened, making Mission Hospital the largest medical center in south Orange County with a total of 274 beds. The Fetal Diagnostic Center and the Mission Rehabilitation Center opened.
- In 1993, the Children's Hospital at Mission, now known as CHOC at Mission, opened on the fifth floor of Mission Hospital. It was the only pediatric hospital in south Orange County.
- In 1994, the Mission Hospital Regional Medical Center became a member of the non-profit St. Joseph Health System sponsored by the Sisters of St. Joseph of Orange. As a non-profit hospital, the Mission Hospital Foundation broadened its scope to include raising funds for capital needs.
- In 1996, Mission Hospital collaborated with five other not-for-profit organizations to open the South Orange County Family Resource Center serving as a clearing-house for information and resources available to families. Mission Hospital assumed sponsorship of the South County Community Clinic, in San Juan Capistrano, renaming it Camino Health Center.
- In 2002, the Edward and Ann Muldoon Cardiac Center opened.
- In 2003, Mission opened a health center in Ladera Ranch. Along with the Mission Health Center in Rancho Santa Margarita, the urgent care center provides the community service for minor emergencies and basic health care needs.
- In 2004, Community Health Improvement Services continues to expand offerings of community health education seminars, lectures, support groups and screenings that are free to the public. In ten years, Mission has invested close to $4 million toward community wellness programs that have served nearly 135,300 local residents.
- In 2005, Mission Hospital receives the Ernest A. Codman Award, from the Joint Commission on Accreditation of Healthcare Organizations for excellence in the use of outcomes measurement to achieve health care quality improvement in traumatic brain injury.
- In 2009, Mission Hospital expanded the Emergency Department, Mission Regional Trauma Center, and opened a new Cancer Institute. The expansions added 122 patient beds.

== See also ==
- Providence St. Joseph Health
- St. Jude Medical Center
