= John Wesson Ashford =

American psychiatrist and neuroscientist

Dr. John Wesson Ashford
- Born: May 29, 1948 (age 78); San Francisco, United States
- Education: University of California, Berkeley
- Occupations: Psychiatrist; Neuroscientist
- Years active: 1978-present
- Employer: VA Palo Alto Health Care System
- Known for: Work on Alzheimer’s disease

John Wesson Ashford is an American psychiatrist and neuroscientist. His studies include Alzheimer's disease and its effects on human memory. Ashford is Chair of the Memory Screening Advisory Board of the Alzheimer's Foundation of America, and a senior editor of the Journal of Alzheimer's Disease. He also serves as a Director of the War Related Illness and Injury Study Center in the VA Palo Alto Health Care System, as well as the clinical professor of Psychiatry and Behavioral Sciences (affiliated) at Stanford University.

== Early life and education ==
Ashford was born in San Francisco, California on May 29, 1948. He earned his Bachelor of Arts degree at the University of California, Berkeley in 1970, and attended the University of California, Los Angeles (UCLA), where he obtained both an MD in 1974 and a PhD in 1984 in Neuroscience. He completed his Psychiatry Residency training in 1979 and had 2 years of post-doctoral training in the MHTP (Mental Health Training Program) at the UCLA Brain Research Institute.
