= Goleta Valley Cottage Hospital =

Hospital in Goleta, California

Geography
- Location: 351 South Patterson Avenue, Goleta, Santa Barbara County, California, United States
- Coordinates: 34°25′59″N 119°48′38″W

Organization
- Care system: Private
- Type: Community
- Network: Cottage Health

Services
- Emergency department: Yes
- Beds: 52

History
- Former name: Valley Hospital
- Founded: 1965 (as Valley Hospital)

Links
- Website: Official website
- Lists: Hospitals in California

Goleta Valley Cottage Hospital (GVCH) is a nonprofit community hospital in Goleta, California. It is part of Cottage Health, the health system that also runs Santa Barbara Cottage Hospital. Local leaders founded GVCH in the 1960s as Valley Hospital, and it joined Cottage in 1996. Faced with California's seismic safety law for hospitals which requires general acute care inpatient hospital buildings to withstand major earthquakes and remain operational, Cottage considered ending acute care in Goleta in 2002, but community opposition kept the hospital open. Major renovations saw a new two-story, 52-bed building which opened in August 2015 at a cost of $126 million. The hospital is known for its Ridley-Tree Center for Wound Management, and its emergency department serves much of the Goleta Valley, including UC Santa Barbara.

== History ==
=== Valley Hospital ===
In 1963, as new housing tracts spread across the Goleta Valley, a group of local leaders saw the need for a community hospital. Valley Hospital opened two years later. Cottage Health gives the founding year as 1966. The hospital offered a birth center, cardiac care and an emergency room. In 1984, it was named an official Olympic hospital for the Olympic rowing events held at Lake Casitas.

In the early 1990s, the hospital ran into financial trouble. It lost outpatient business to for-profit surgical centers, and its cardiac caseload fell when Marian Hospital in Santa Maria opened its own cardiac unit. In 1996, Valley Hospital merged with the Cottage Health System and was renamed Goleta Valley Cottage Hospital.

=== Threat of closure ===
After the 1994 Northridge earthquake damaged 11 hospitals, the California Legislature passed Senate Bill 1953 which required every acute care hospital to be retrofitted or rebuilt to survive a major earthquake. In 2002, as Cottage weighed the cost, it raised the possibility that Goleta Valley would stop providing acute care. That change would have left only an emergency room and a long-term care unit with all surgery moving to Santa Barbara.

Residents formed the Committee to Save Goleta Valley Hospital led by two longtime nurses at the hospital, Ann Kwarcinski and Patty Charest. The committee appealed to the new Goleta City Council and to county supervisors, and a community meeting it helped organize filled the auditorium of Goleta Valley Junior High School. Its bumper stickers read "Goleta Valley Hospital – Use It or Lose It". Cottage kept the hospital open and added services including a Center for Wound Management with hyperbaric oxygen treatment and a lithotripter for kidney stones. After St. Francis Hospital in Santa Barbara closed, several specialist surgeons moved to Goleta which became a regional center for oral and maxillofacial surgery. By 2006, the hospital was earning a profit of $3.7 million according to its chief administrator, Diane Wisby.

=== Replacement hospital ===
Cottage decided to build a new hospital on the parking lot south of the original building. Construction was paid for through hospital operations, tax-exempt bonds and donations. Work began in March 2011. The estimated cost rose from about $103 million in 2007 to $123 million in 2012 and ultimately $126 million at completion.

The new hospital opened at the end of August 2015. It has all private rooms, and its emergency department grew from eight semi-private rooms to 20 private rooms to care for about 25,000 patients a year. The building was designed so a third floor could be added later and a tube system under Patterson Avenue carries lab samples to Pacific Diagnostic Laboratories across the street. The original 1960s building was demolished in October 2015 and a 50,000-square-foot (4,600 m^{2}) medical office building at the corner of Hollister and Patterson Avenues followed in 2016.

=== Since 2015 ===
In its 2025 community benefit report to the state, the hospital reported $14.0 million in community benefit spending. This included $1.2 million in charity care. After the Santa Barbara Half Marathon on November 8, 2026, seven runners were treated at Goleta Valley Cottage Hospital and 19 at Santa Barbara Cottage Hospital for what county health officials said was most likely heat-related illness.

== Services ==
The hospital has an emergency department, surgery, inpatient care and wound care. Its Ridley-Tree Center for Wound Management includes hyperbaric oxygen chambers. It also provides elective orthopedic surgery and physical, occupational and speech therapy. Major trauma cases are sent to Santa Barbara Cottage Hospital, the region's trauma center.

== See also ==
- Santa Barbara Cottage Hospital
- List of hospitals in California
