= UCI Health – Los Alamitos =

UCI Health - Los Alamitos
- UC Irvine Health

Geography
- Location: 3751 Katella Avenue, Los Alamitos, California, United States
- Coordinates: 33.8044°N 118.0673°W

Organization
- Care system: Private hospital
- Type: General hospital
- Affiliated university: University of California, Irvine

Services
- Emergency department: Yes
- Beds: 167

History
- Former name: Los Alamitos Medical Center

Links
- Website: www.ucihealth.org/locations/los-alamitos/uci-health-los-alamitos
- Lists: Hospitals in California

UCI Health – Los Alamitos is a for-profit hospital in Los Alamitos, California, United States. It was formerly owned by health care provider Tenet Healthcare and is now owned by UC Irvine Health.

== History ==
In December late 2012, Los Alamitos Medical Center was dropped by Health Net, after Tenet Healthcare wanted a higher reimbursement rate.

On September 20, 2019, registered nurses from the California Nurses Association/National Nurses Organizing Committee went on a one-day strike at the hospital, they protested that there were not enough nurses to take care of patients.

In late October 2020, employees belonging to SEIU United Healthcare Workers West threatened a 1-day strike at the hospital due to COVID-19 safety measures.

In January 2021, Los Alamitos Medical Center had a temporary medical tent constructed in its parking lot to treat COVID-19 patients. In late August, caregivers approved a new contract for hire pay and benefits, ending their strike.

On February 1, 2024, UCI Health, part of the University of California, Irvine agreed to purchase Los Alamitos Medical Center from Tenet Healthcare. On March 27, UCI Health officially took over the management of Los Alamitos Medical Center and rebranded it to UCI Health – Los Alamitos.

== See also ==
- List of hospitals in California
