= Adventist Health Community Care-Hanford =

- Adventist Health

Geography
- Location: Hanford, California, United States
- Coordinates: 36.3238618°N 119.6669546°W

Organization
- Care system: Private, Medicare, Medicaid
- Type: Community

Services
- Emergency department: Standby, Physician On Call

Links
- Website: http://www.adventisthealth.org/central-valley/pages/central-valley-home.aspx
- Lists: Hospitals in California

Adventist Health Community Care-Hanford (formerly Central Valley General Hospital) is a clinic in Hanford, California. It offers extensive Community Care clinic services serving communities in Kings, Tulare and southern Fresno counties. Adventist Health Community Care-Hanford is a part of a division of Adventist Health known as the "Adventist Health/Central Valley Network," Adventist Health Hanford, Adventist Health Selma, Adventist Health Reedley, and over 42 Adventist Health/Community Care clinics throughout a 2,500-square-mile (6,500 km^{2}) region in the Central Valley.

== History ==
In 1998, Adventist Health’s growth in the San Joaquin Valley surged with the purchase of Central Valley General Hospital, formerly called Sacred Heart Hospital, in Hanford. A year later, Adventist Health purchased Selma Community Hospital, about 15 miles north of Hanford. Central Valley General Hospital and Selma Community Hospital also began opening rural health clinics to improve rural patients’ access to health care in the region.

In 2005, the hospital licenses of Hanford Community and Selma Community were combined, and Central Valley General Hospital took over the Selma Community clinics to consolidate operations among the three hospitals in an effort to improve access, quality and strength.

The local network now offers forty-two Adventist Health/Community Care clinic sites in Kings County, Fresno County, Tulare County, Kern County & Madera as well as physical therapy centers, a Sleep Apnea Center and many other services in the 2,500-square-mile (6,500 km^{2}) region.

On March 7, 2016, the labor and deliver services moved to the new Family Birth Center at Adventist Medical Center – Hanford on Mall Drive. The birth center is a $44 million state-of-the-art facility that focuses on patient experience. It features 11 private labor and delivery rooms, two surgery suites, a six-bed neonatal intensive care unit operated by Valley Children's Healthcare, 16 postpartum rooms, a café, gift shop and more.

With this move, Central Valley General hospital is no longer an inpatient hospital, and was renamed Adventist Health Community Care - Hanford. The six clinic services remain at the campus, including Community Care – Hanford primary care, Behavioral Health, Dental, Family Medicine Residency, Healthy Beginnings and Specialty.
