= Kaiser San Francisco Medical Center =

- Kaiser Permanente

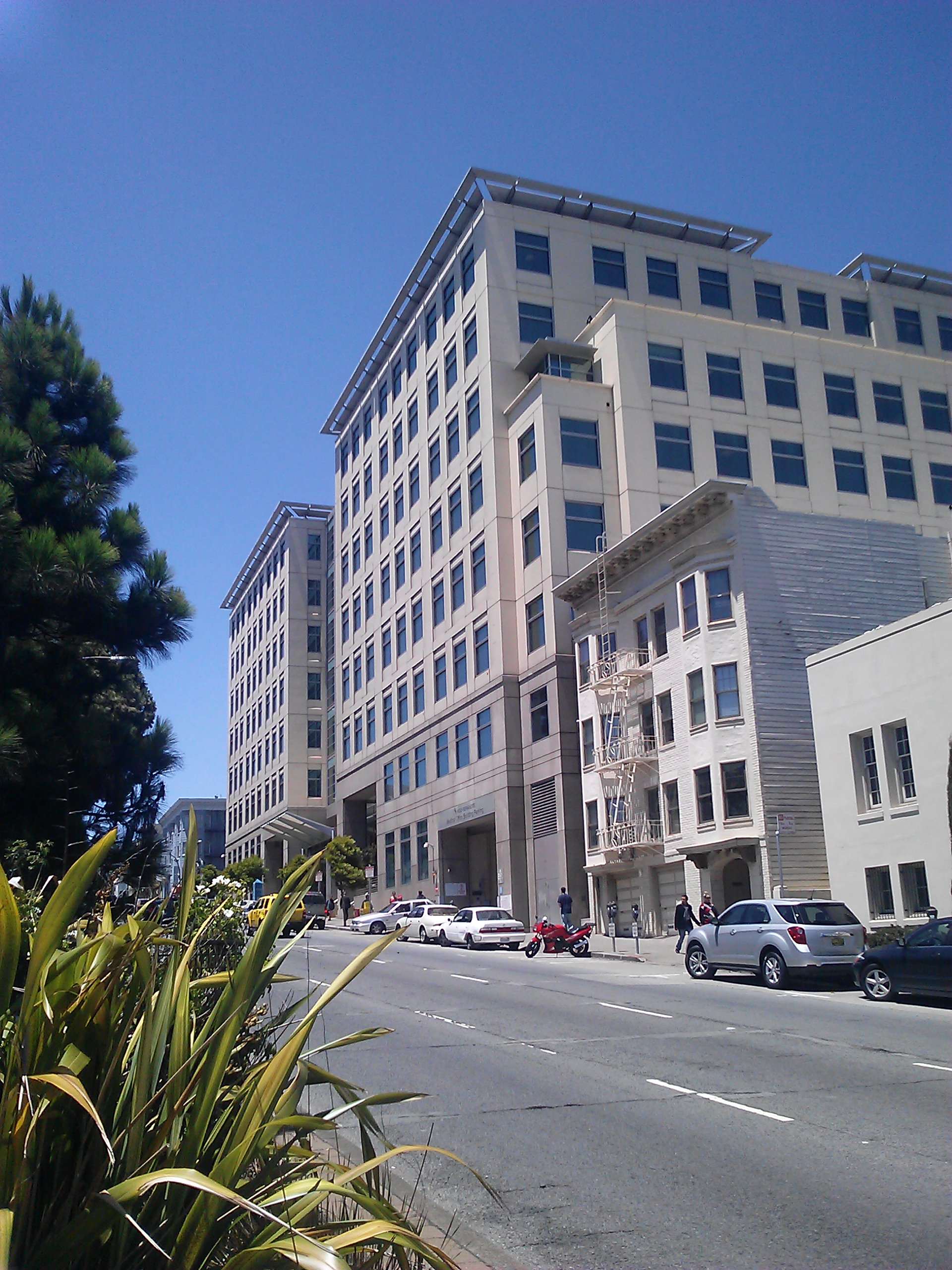
- Kaiser Permanente, Geary Hospital

Geography
- Location: San Francisco, California, United States

Services
- Beds: 247

Links
- Lists: Hospitals in California

Kaiser San Francisco Medical Center consists of four Kaiser Permanente medical office and center campuses in San Francisco, California, the main San Francisco Medical Center, the Geary Hospital, French Campus, and Mission Bay.

== History ==
=== French Hospital ===
The French Hospital of San Francisco, officially La Societe Francaise de Bienfaisance Mutuelle (French Mutual Benevolent Society), was founded in 1851 as San Francisco's first private hospital. It was originally located 990 Jackson Street (1851), (Note: "Rincon Hill was really dubbed "Nob Hill" first, on account of the Nabobs, but of course they went over to Nob Hill") on Rincon Hill. Later locations were: 901 Bush, on the corner of Taylor Street (1853), Bryant at 5th Streets (1856), and Geary (1895). A new French Hospital was dedicated on 4 May 1963, Geary Street at 6th Avenue. It is now known as the "French Campus" of Kaiser Permanente.

=== Incidents ===
In 2008, 960 babies were potentially exposed to tuberculosis at the hospital's postpartum unit.

In 2010, the hospital was fined US$100,000 for failing to properly treat a diabetic patient that later died.
