= San Antonio Regional Hospital =

Geography
- Location: Upland, California, United States
- Coordinates: 34°06′05″N 117°38′16″W

Organization
- Funding: Private - Private Foundation, nonprofit
- Type: Regional

Services
- Beds: 363

History
- Opened: 1907

Links
- Website: www.sarh.org
- Lists: Hospitals in California

San Antonio Regional Hospital (SARH), previously known as San Antonio Community Hospital, is an acute, full service medical center in Upland, California.

The hospital offers a comprehensive range of general medical and surgical services, along with cardiac care, cancer care, orthopedics, neurosciences, women’s health, maternity and neonatal care, and emergency services. It was founded in 1907 at 792 W. Arrow Highway by Dr. William H. Craig with only 18 beds and 5 physicians.

SARH also owns several satellite facilities throughout the surrounding community including Rancho San Antonio Medical Plaza in the city of Rancho Cucamonga, California, Sierra San Antonio Medical Plaza in the city of Fontana, California, and Eastvale San Antonio Medical Plaza in the city of Eastvale, California, effectively giving them a regional monopoly.
