= Hoag (health network) =

Hospital network in Orange County, California

Hoag Memorial Hospital Presbyterian

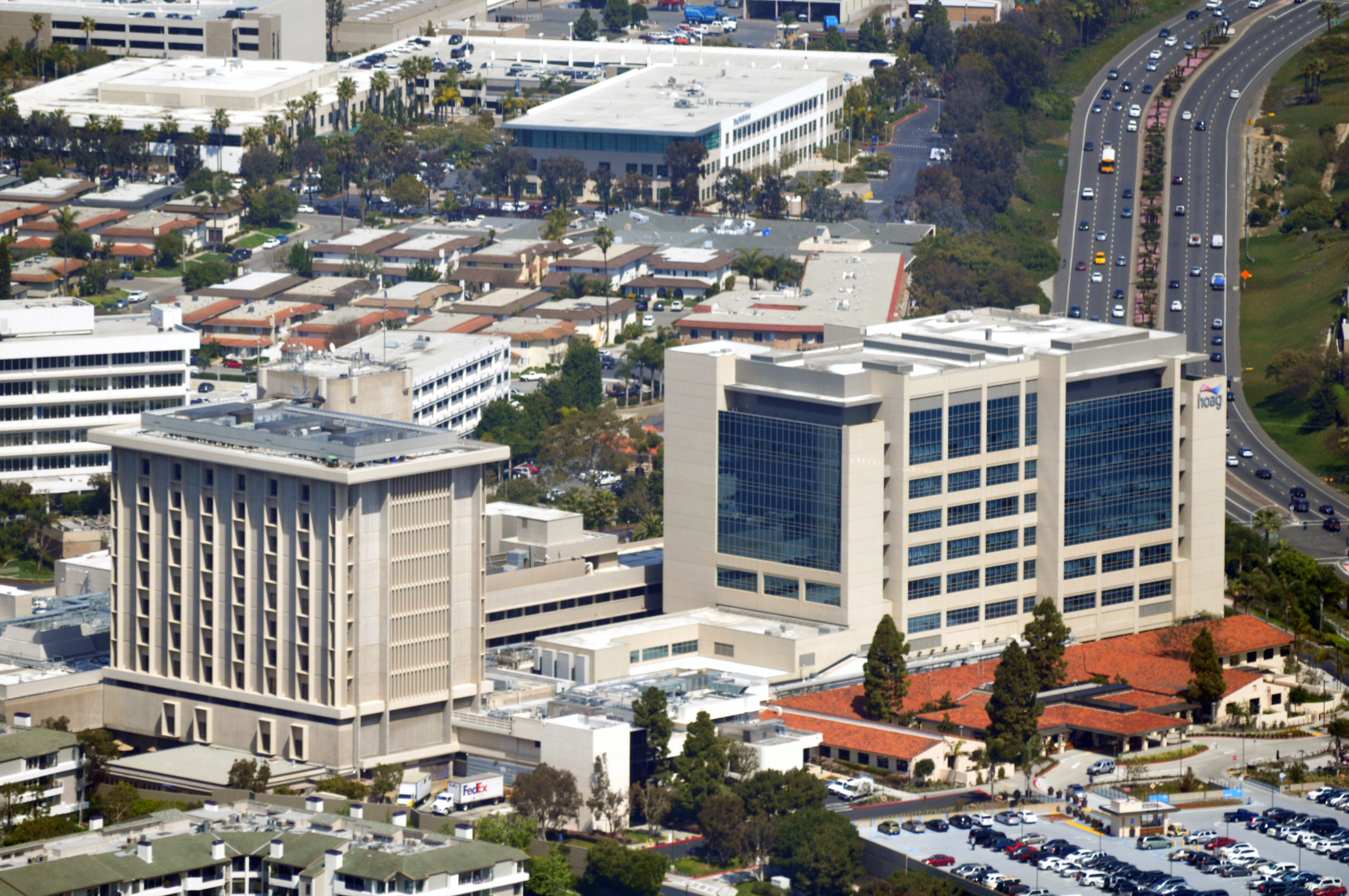
- Hoag Memorial Hospital Presbyterian

Geography
- Location: Orange County, California, United States
- Coordinates: 33.6239°N 117.9294°W

Organization
- Type: General

Services
- Emergency department: Yes
- Beds: 652

History
- Founded: 1952

Links
- Website: hoag.org
- Lists: Hospitals in California

Hoag is a not-for-profit regional health care network in Orange County, California. It comprises two acute-care hospitals, seven health centers, and four urgent care centers, and treats roughly 30,000 inpatients and 350,000 outpatients a year.

The two hospitals, Hoag Hospital Newport Beach (opened 1952) and Hoag Hospital Irvine (opened 2010), are designated Magnet hospitals by the American Nurses Credentialing Center. Hoag's specialized care is organized into five institutes, covering cancer, heart and vascular medicine, neurosciences, women's health, and orthopedics, the last through its affiliate the Hoag Orthopedic Institute.

== Hospitals ==
Hoag operates two community hospitals in Orange County:

- Hoag Hospital Newport Beach is an acute-care, not-for-profit hospital in Newport Beach, on the Orange County coast.
- Hoag Hospital Irvine opened in 2010 and is a 154-bed acute-care general hospital with inpatient and outpatient services and an emergency room.

== Facilities ==
Hoag's specialized care is organized into five institutes, plus the affiliated Hoag Orthopedic Institute:

- Hoag Family Cancer Institute organizes care into programs by cancer type, covering diagnosis, treatment, and support services.
- Hoag Heart & Vascular Institute provides cardiac surgery, including minimally invasive and beating-heart procedures, angioplasty, stent placement, ablation for arrhythmia, treatment of aortic aneurysms, and bypass surgery with endoscopic vein harvesting.
- Hoag Neurosciences Institute treats neurological disorders including Alzheimer's disease and dementia, brain tumors, aneurysms and vascular malformations, epilepsy, headache disorders, movement disorders such as Parkinson's disease, multiple sclerosis, sleep disorders, spinal disorders, and stroke.
- Hoag Women's Health Institute provides gynecologic care, maternity services, and breast care through the Hoag Breast Care Center. In 2011, the breast center became, by its own account, the first in California to offer tomosynthesis (3D mammography) for women with dense breast tissue.
- Hoag Orthopedic Institute comprises a 72-bed specialty hospital in Irvine with nine operating rooms, together with surgery centers in Newport Beach, Orange, Mission Viejo, and Marina del Rey.

== History ==
Plans for a hospital serving coastal Orange County date to 1944, when the Rev. Raymond Brahams, seven Presbyterian church members, and one physician incorporated as the Presbyterian Hospital of Laguna Beach. After a local fund-raising campaign and the purchase of a site on the bluffs in Newport Beach, they renamed it the Presbyterian Hospital of Orange County. They could not afford construction costs after World War II.

In 1950, the Hoag Family Foundation learned of the project and donated the funds to begin construction. The foundation had been established a decade earlier by George Hoag Sr., an early partner in the J. C. Penney Company, with his wife Grace and their son George Hoag II. The hospital was completed in two years and named Hoag Memorial Hospital Presbyterian. It opened on September 15, 1952, with 75 beds, 68 staff physicians, and 60 employees.

The George Hoag Family Foundation and the Association of Presbyterian Members, the hospital's two founding organizations, remain corporate members of the Hoag corporation. They elect the board of directors, which includes representatives of the Hoag community and medical staff and the chief executive officer.

== Rankings ==
In U.S. News & World Report's 2021–2022 Best Hospitals rankings, Hoag was the top-ranked hospital in Orange County, fourth in the Los Angeles metropolitan area, and ninth in California.
