= Santa Barbara Marathon =

Road running event in Santa Barbara, California

Coordinates: 34°24′23.36″N 119°41′54.73″W

- Competitors run in the 2012 marathon.
- Date: Early November
- Location: Santa Barbara, California
- Event type: Road
- Distance: Marathon and half marathon
- Established: 1965
- Course records: Marathon: - Men: 2:22:28, Moninda Marube (2011); - Women: 2:42:44, Elisa Karhu (2013); Half-Marathon: - Men: 1:06:35, Alex Cyr (2025); - Women: 1:17:38, Addi Zerrenner (2021)
- Website: santabarbarahalf.com

The Santa Barbara Marathon, now the Santa Barbara Half Marathon, is a road race in Santa Barbara, California. First run in 1965, it is one of the oldest marathons in California. The original race was held from 1965 to 1984 and was then revived in 2009 as the Santa Barbara International Marathon, a point-to-point race from Goleta to Santa Barbara City College that served as a Boston Marathon qualifier. Falling entries led organizers to cancel the 2015 marathon three weeks before race day. A Veterans Day half marathon that carried on was itself called off at the starting line in 2017. Starting in 2021 the Santa Barbara Half Marathon & 5K, has been held each November on a course through the waterfront and downtown. Its sixth edition, on November 8, 2026, drew a record field of more than 7,500. Thirty runners needed medical treatment and 26 were taken to hospital, most likely from racing in unusual heat, according to county health officials.

== History ==
=== Original race (1965–1984) ===
A group of local distance runners started the Santa Barbara Marathon in 1965, when only about five annual marathons were held in the United States. Twenty-seven runners started the first race, from the University of California, Santa Barbara to Santa Barbara City College and 17 finished. From the following year the race started and finished at the college. There were no aid stations and the roads were not closed to traffic. The field peaked at 354 runners in 1977, numbers then fell as runners turned to larger marathons and the last race of the original series was held in 1984.

=== Santa Barbara International Marathon (2009–2014) ===
After a gap of 24 years, race directors Rusty and June Snow revived the marathon. The first race of the new series was held on December 6, 2009. Carlos Handler won in 2:24:48 and Andrea McLarty was the first woman in 2:52:23. Some 1,686 runners finished the marathon, with about 300 more finishing the relay.

Starting in 2010, the race moved to November. Most entrants that year ran the half marathon, which had 2,297 finishers to the marathon's 998. The finish was also moved inside the City College stadium, ending with three-quarters of a lap of the track. Marube won again in 2011, setting the race record of 2:22:28.

In 2012, after the New York City Marathon was cancelled because of Hurricane Sandy, the organizers offered discounted entry to runners who had been registered for New York. Paige Higgins of Colorado lowered the women's record to 2:48:35 that year, finishing seventh overall behind the winner, Abraham Kogo, who ran 2:23:10. Across the marathon, half marathon and relay, 5,064 runners finished.

The race was renamed the Santa Barbara International Veterans Marathon in 2013, timed for Veterans Day. Elisa Karhu, a 21-year-old pre-medical student, won the women's race in 2:42:44, almost six minutes under Higgins's record. Peter Kemboi of Kenya won the men's race in 2:32:10. In 2014 Sammy Mutai and Paige Burgin won in hot conditions. That year runners complained when promised finisher medals were not handed out.

=== Cancellations (2015–2017) ===
On October 14, 2015, about three weeks before race day, the organizers cancelled the full marathon and marathon relay because too few runners had signed up to cover production costs. Race director Rusty Snow called it "an incredibly hard decision". The race, by then known as the Santa Barbara Veterans Day Marathon, normally drew about 4,000 entrants. Its lead sponsor was the Pierre Claeyssens Veterans Foundation. Marathon entrants were offered a switch to the half marathon with a $20 refund, a discount on the next year's race or a full refund, though refunds were not to be processed until 2016. The half marathon went ahead on November 7, 2015, on a course from UC Santa Barbara around Hope Ranch to Leadbetter Beach. Marube won the men's race again, and Kelly Couch won the women's race in 1:22:47.

On November 11, 2017, the Veterans Day half marathon was cancelled at the starting line at Chase Palm Park. About 500 runners had gathered for the 7 a.m. start, but police assigned to the race judged it unsafe to proceed because almost no volunteers were posted along the course. "It's on me," race director June Snow said, explaining that she had put off recruiting volunteers. Up to half the field ran the course anyway, without official times or medals. The Veterans Day half marathon had started in 2010 as a companion to the marathon, and the two races drew more than 5,000 entries at their peak in 2012. No full-length Santa Barbara Marathon has been held since 2014.

=== Santa Barbara Half Marathon (2021–present) ===
A new event, the Santa Barbara Half Marathon and 5K, was launched by Run Local, a company that produces road races in California. It began with a free virtual edition in November and December 2020, during the COVID-19 pandemic. The first in-person race was held on November 7, 2021. Its course starts on Cabrillo Boulevard along the waterfront, loops through downtown past Alice Keck Park Memorial Garden and Alameda Park and finishes with a downhill on State Street. Hoka became its presenting sponsor with the race benefiting the youth programs of the Santa Barbara Running Association. Its field has grown every year, from about 3,600 half marathoners in 2023 to a sell-out of 7,500 entrants across all races in 2025.

Phillip Reid of San Luis Obispo won the men's race in each of its first three years, setting an event record of 1:06:54 in 2022. Addi Zerrenner set the women's record of 1:17:38 when she won the first race in 2021. In 2025 Alex Cyr of Toronto lowered the men's record to 1:06:35.

==== 2026 race ====
The sixth Santa Barbara Half Marathon was held on November 8, 2026. It drew more than 7,500 participants in the half marathon and 5K, from a record 47 states and 19 countries. Garrett Reynolds, 29, of Ventura won the half marathon in 1:08:19, two seconds ahead of Jacob Hernandez. Emily Jackson, 25, of Santa Barbara was the first woman in 1:21:18. Joshua Morgan and Baneet Bains won the 5K.

The race was run under bright sunshine, with a high of 86 °F (30 °C), about 10 °F (5.6 °C) above the average for the date. The first call for medical help came at 8:41 a.m., from a runner with symptoms of heat exhaustion, and emergency crews were called to several points along the route between 9:40 and 10:45 a.m. That evening the Santa Barbara Police Department said they were investigating "suspicious circumstances" after runners sought treatment for "unusual symptoms", as rumors spread on social media that a water station had been spiked.

On November 9 the Santa Barbara County Public Health Department said 30 runners had received medical treatment for what was most likely heat-related illness. Four were treated at the scene and 26 were taken to the hospital, 19 to Santa Barbara Cottage Hospital and seven to Goleta Valley Cottage Hospital. The department called it "an isolated event connected directly to race participation and the heat", with "no indication of a broader public health concern". It said inspectors had found no problems with the race's electrolyte drinks when they checked them before the event. Cottage Health said it treated 27 runners and had discharged 24, with three still in hospital in stable condition. Police said their investigation was continuing. Event director David Monico said organizers had "no reason to believe that it's anything more than just the heat and exhaustion from the half marathon".

== Course ==
The International Marathon started at Dos Pueblos High School in Goleta. It ran through the Goleta area and along the edge of Isla Vista, then through residential neighborhoods toward central Santa Barbara. Near the end runners faced a steep climb, followed by a downhill run with views of the Pacific Ocean into the Santa Barbara City College stadium.

== Philanthropy ==
After the 2009 race the Snows gave leftover water and energy bars to the Foodbank of Santa Barbara County, and clothing discarded along the course to the Unity Shoppe. In 2011 the race gave $1 from each entry fee to the Community Environmental Council, a total of $5,000.

== Winners ==
=== Marathon ===
Key: Race record

Date	Men	Time	Women	Time	Finishers
Full marathon cancelled in 2015; not held since
November 8, 2014	Sammy Mutai	2:31:40	Paige Burgin	3:06:39	864
November 9, 2013	Peter Kemboi	2:32:10	Elisa Karhu	2:42:44	1,092
November 10, 2012	Abraham Kogo	2:23:10	Paige Higgins	2:48:35	1,379
November 12, 2011	Moninda Marube	2:22:28	Laura Turner	3:03:27	883
November 6, 2010	Moninda Marube	2:25:49	Liz Gottlieb	3:01:07	998
December 6, 2009	Carlos Handler	2:24:48	Andrea McLarty	2:52:23	1,686
Not held 1985–2008
November 4, 1984	Robert Hollister	2:25:21	Elaine Triplett	2:54:21	
October 22, 1978	Joe Carlson	2:24:02	Mary Jane Rense	3:15:39	
October 2, 1966	Michael Kimball	2:26:24	Lyn Carman	3:57:51	
October 2, 1965	James van Manen	2:37:48	No women's race		

=== Santa Barbara Half Marathon (2021–present) ===
Race records are highlighted.

Date	Men	Time	Women	Time
November 8, 2026	Garrett Reynolds	1:08:19	Emily Jackson	1:21:18
November 9, 2025	Alex Cyr	1:06:35	Eleanor Baker	1:19:49
November 3, 2024	Chris Frias	1:08:33	Melissa TenKate	1:22:05
November 5, 2023	Phillip Reid	1:07:20	Danielle Zola	1:19:31
November 6, 2022	Phillip Reid	1:06:54	Eva Townsend	1:19:38
November 7, 2021	Phillip Reid	1:07:14	Addi Zerrenner	1:17:38
