= San Joaquin General Hospital =

- San Joaquin County Health Care Services
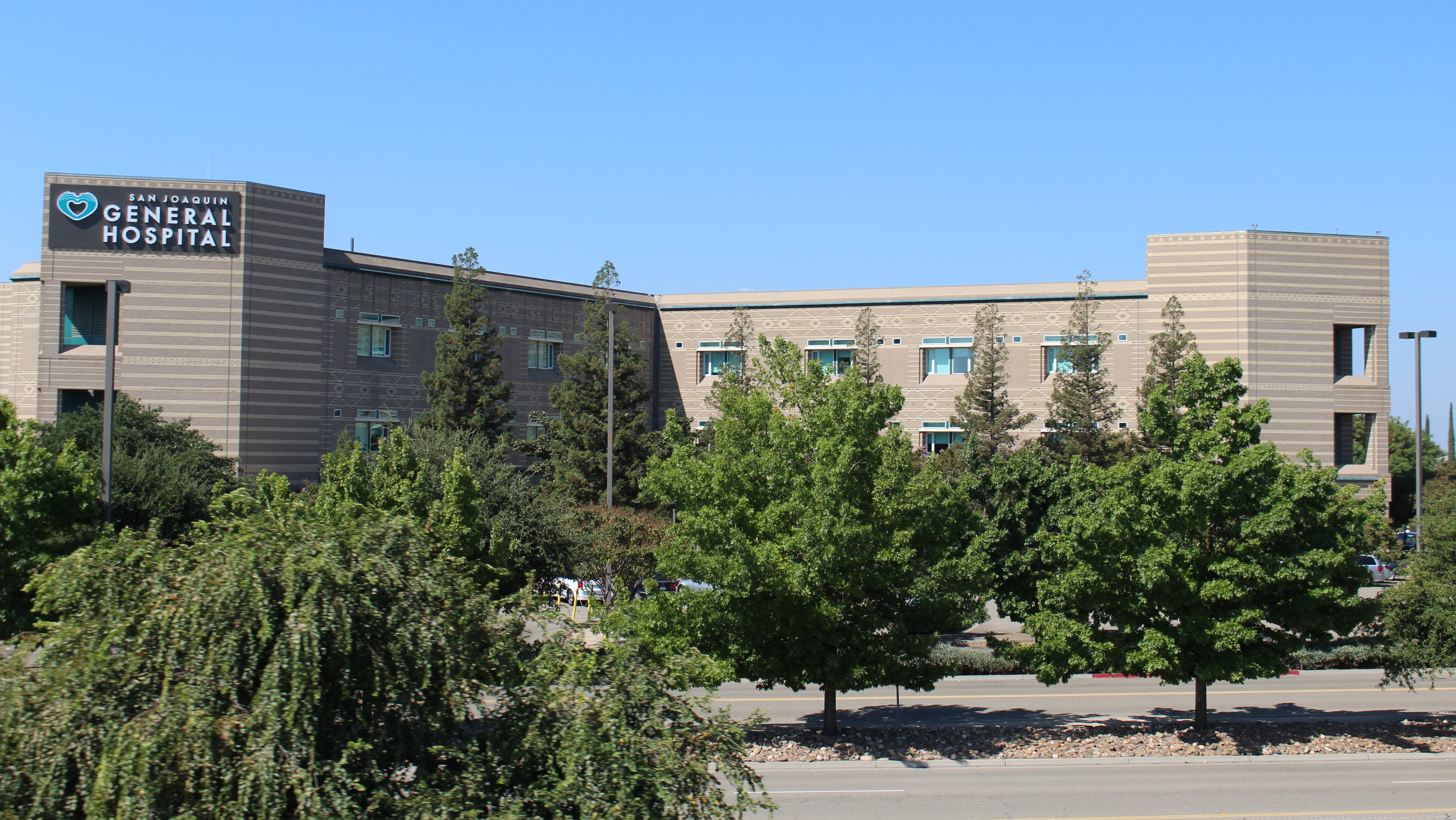

- Location within California

Geography
- Location: French Camp, San Joaquin County, California, United States
- Coordinates: 37.8866°N 121.2823°W

Organization
- Type: Teaching
- Affiliated university: University of California, Davis; University of the Pacific

Services
- Emergency department: Level II trauma center
- Beds: 152

Helipads
- Helipad: Yes

History
- Founded: 1857

Links
- Website: http://www.sjgeneral.org]/
- Lists: Hospitals in California

San Joaquin General Hospital is a 152-bed public teaching hospital located within the San Joaquin County area of French Camp, California, United States.

== About ==
San Joaquin General Hospital, funded by San Joaquin County, is a general acute care facility providing a full range of inpatient services, including General Medical/Surgical Care, High-Risk Obstetrics and Neonatal Intensive Care, Pediatrics, and Acute Physical Medicine and Rehabilitation.

The hospital is the only trauma center serving the 700,000 residents of San Joaquin County. San Joaquin General Hospital is also a primary stroke center and the county's EMS base station. The county's EMS administrative and education facility is immediately adjacent to the hospital.

The hospital offers physician residencies in family medicine, internal medicine, and general surgery. The physician residencies are affiliated with the University of California, Davis School of Medicine. The hospital also has a pharmacy residency program, and is a teaching site for the University of the Pacific School of Pharmacy.

== History ==
It was originally established in 1857 as the San Joaquin County Hospital and Alms House. The original hospital building was expanded with two wings in 1879; and was destroyed in 1886 by a fire.

== See also ==
- Hospitals in California
