= Sonoma Valley Hospital =

Coordinates: 38.2882°N 122.4648°W

Geography
- Location: Sonoma, California, United States

Services
- Beds: 51

History
- Opened: 1945

Links
- Lists: Hospitals in California

Sonoma Valley Hospital is a hospital located in Sonoma, California, United States. The hospital, which has 51 beds, provides surgical and general medical procedures. The hospital started in 1945 and the current hospital opened in 1957, with expansions happening starting in the 1970s. In 2018, the hospital closed its obstetrics facilities due to a decrease in births.
