= Bellwood General Hospital =

- Paracelsus Healthcare Corporation

Geography
- Location: 33°52′22.28″N 118°6′59.06″W, Bellflower, California, United States

Organization
- Care system: Private
- Type: Community
- Affiliated university: None

Services
- Beds: 85

History
- Closed: 2003

Links
- Lists: Hospitals in California

Bellwood General Hospital was a hospital in Bellflower, California. It was closed April 6, 2003.

== History ==
On February 2, 1982, the hospital was acquired by Paracelsus Healthcare Corporation. Paracelsus Healthcare Corporation (later renamed to Clarent Hospital Corporation) ceased business operations following an agreement to pay $7.3 million to settle allegations that it defrauded Medicare at two facilities — Orange County Community Hospital ("OCCH") and Bellwood General Hospital.

As part of its bankruptcy, the company sold or closed all of its hospitals with Bellwood General being on the closure list. Bellwood Health Facility, an OSHPD-Licensed Psychiatric Health Facility, continues to operate adjacent to the original site.
