= Ventura County Medical Center =

Geography
- Location: 3291 Loma Vista Road, Ventura, California, United States
- Coordinates: 34.281°N 119.254°W

Organization
- Care system: County, Medicare, Medicaid
- Type: Teaching
- Affiliated university: USC Keck School of Medicine

Services
- Emergency department: Level II trauma center
- Beds: 274

History
- Founded: opened 1919

Links
- Website: http://www.vchca.org/hospitals/ventura-county-medical-center
- Lists: Hospitals in California

Ventura County Medical Center is a hospital in the city of Ventura, California, United States. It is a Level II Trauma Center with 274 bed acute care hospital. The county also operates a 49-bed campus in Santa Paula. As a teaching hospital, affiliated with the USC Keck School of Medicine since 2022, it was recognized as the best family medicine residency program in the United States in 2014. As of 2025, the program was ranked second in the country.

A 220,000 square-foot state-of-the-art replacement wing is currently under construction to meet California's updated seismic regulations, and is scheduled its completion mid 2017. replacing older facilities built in 1923 and 1953.

== Services ==
Ventura County Medical Center is a full-service acute care hospital with a 24-hour emergency center. Along with intensive care and definitive observation units, it also houses specialty care units such as medical/ surgical, telemetry and oncology, pediatric, and neonatal.

In November 2014, the county health center launched the public health initiative How High Ventura County. It is the largest teen marijuana education platform in California, launched in order to educate parents about the harm that consuming marijuana causes to the adolescent brain.

The county board of supervisors formed the Ventura County Health Care System Oversight Committee in 2022 to ensure the county medical system follows rules for billing federal health care programs.

== See also ==
- Santa Paula Hospital
