= UCI Health – Fountain Valley =

- UC Irvine Health

Geography
- Location: 17100 Euclid Street, Fountain Valley, California, United States
- Coordinates: 33.7149°N 117.9349°W

Organization
- Care system: Private hospital
- Type: General hospital
- Affiliated university: University of California, Irvine

Services
- Emergency department: Yes
- Beds: 400

Helipads
- Helipad: Aeronautical chart and airport information for 93CA at SkyVector

History
- Former name: Fountain Valley Regional Hospital

Links
- Website: www.ucihealth.org/locations/fountain-valley/uci-health-fountain-valley
- Lists: Hospitals in California

UCI Health – Fountain Valley is a for-profit hospital in Fountain Valley, California, United States. It was formerly owned by health care provider Tenet Healthcare and is now owned by UC Irvine Health.

== History ==
In early March 2009, Fountain Valley Regional Hospital was fined $25,000 by the California Department of Public Health after a nurse gave a patient oral medicine intravenously.

In late August 2012, Fountain Valley Regional Hospital was fined $25,000 by the California Department of Public Health, after a nurse improperly removed a gastrostomy tube from a patient. In late December, Fountain Valley Hospital was dropped by Health Net, after Tenet Healthcare wanted a higher reimbursement rate.

In late January 2014, the California Department of Public Health fined Fountain Valley Hospital $75,000 after one of its patients died.

On February 1, 2018, Sodexo workers went on a one-day strike at the hospital for better pay and benefits. In late May, they won a 42% pay increase that would raise pay from $11 to $15.61 by January 2020.

In early July 2020, a complaint was filed against Fountain Valley Regional Hospital by the National Union of Healthcare Workers to the California Department of Public Health. When the California Department of Public Health investigated they found COVID-19 patients not being quarantined, physicians not correctly washing their hands and other violations. After seeing these violations the hospital was fined.

On May 6, 2021, workers went on strike for one hour to protest low pay, understaffing and unsafe working conditions after a worker died at Fountain Valley Regional Hospital. In late July, caregivers approved a strike for hire pay and better benefits. In late August, they approved a new contract.

In late October 2022, registered nurses and other healthcare workers at the hospital approved a strike, for a new contract that would address staffing shortages, safety issues and to replace outdated equipment. On December 1, they approved the new contract without going on strike, increasing their pay by 41%.

On February 1, 2024, UCI Health which is part of the University of California, Irvine agreed to purchase Fountain Valley Regional Hospital from Tenet Healthcare. On March 27, UCI Health officially took over the management of Fountain Valley Hospital and rebranded it to UCI Health – Fountain Valley.

== See also ==
- List of hospitals in California
