= Olympia Medical Center =

Geography
- Location: Los Angeles, California, United States
- Coordinates: 34.05734°N 118.36051°W

Organization
- Care system: Private
- Affiliated university: None

Services
- Beds: 204

History
- Founded: 1948
- Closed: 2021

Links
- Website: www.olympiamc.com
- Lists: Hospitals in California

Olympia Medical Center (OMC) was a hospital in Los Angeles, California. It closed to be reconstructed and converted to the new home of the UCLA Health Resnick Neuropsychiatric Clinic, set to open in 2026.

== History ==
Founded in 1948 as Midway Hospital Medical Center, the hospital has had several owners. In 1993, Summit Health Ltd. sold the hospital to OrNda HealthCorp. It was then purchased by Tenet Healthcare in 1997. The hospital was renamed in April 2005. The new name is drawn from the fact that the building is located on Olympic Blvd. The hospital was eventually sold and closed to be redeveloped by UCLA Health.
