= Robert F. Kennedy Medical Center =

Defunct hospital in California

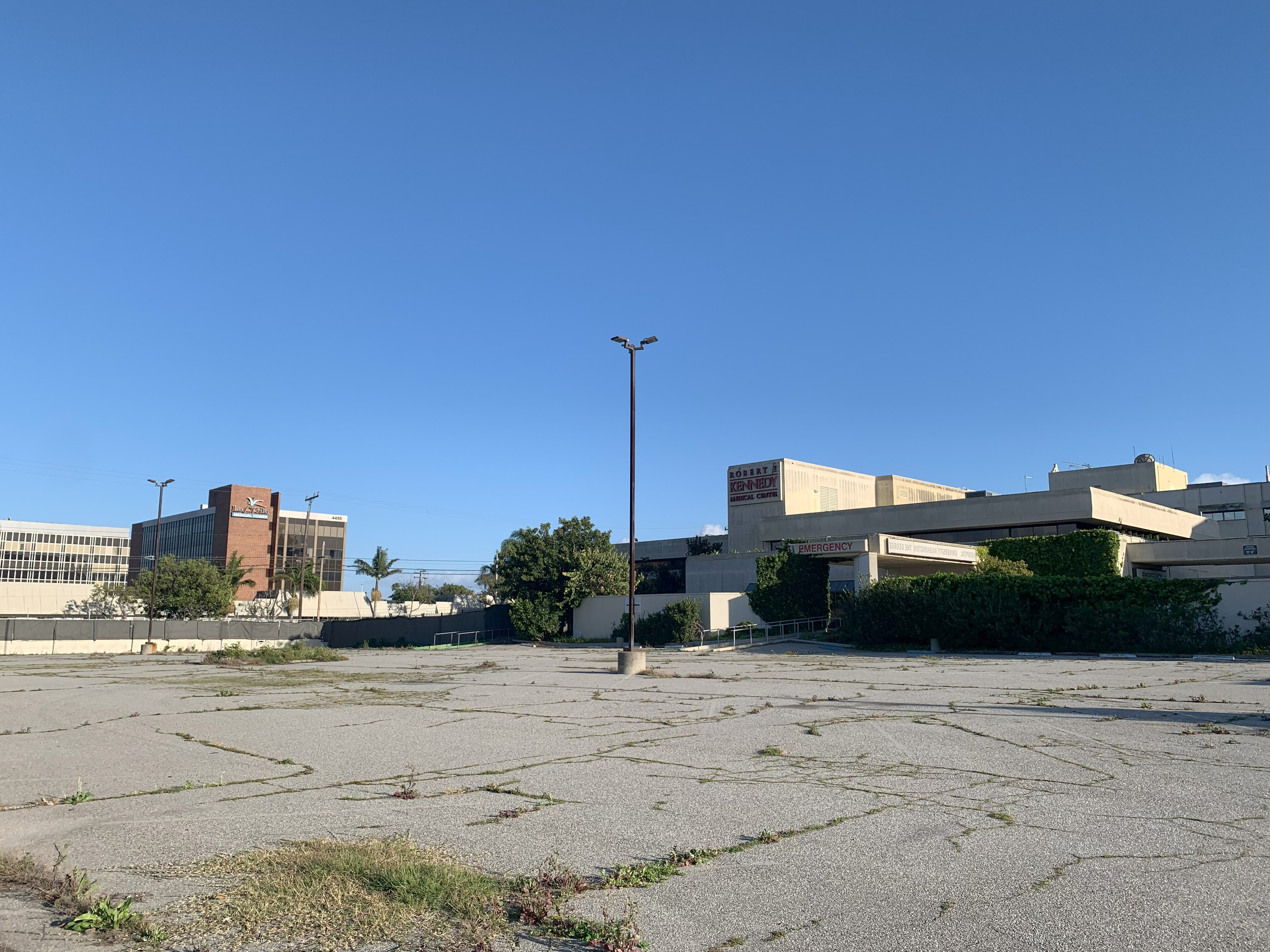
- The hospital’s former lobby entrance c. 2024

Geography
- Location: 4537 W 118th St, Hawthorne, California, United States
- Coordinates: 33°55′40.04″N 118°21′20.26″W

Organization
- Care system: Catholic Healthcare West
- Type: Community hospital
- Religious affiliation: Daughters of Charity of Saint Vincent de Paul
- Patron: St. Francis of Penance
- Network: CHW Regional Systems

Services
- Standards: Joint Commission
- Emergency department: Level II trauma center
- Beds: 274

History
- Founded: December 24, 1924
- Closed: January 1, 2005
- Demolished: c. 2020 (Only Maternity Wing)

Links
- Website: https://web.archive.org/web/20000304153229/http://www.robertfkennedymedctr.org/
- Lists: Hospitals in California

Robert F. Kennedy Medical Center is a vacant former 274-bed hospital located in Hawthorne, California. Upon opening in December 24, 1924 as Hawthorne Community Hospital, the hospital was opened in tandem with Centinela Hospital Medical Center to serve the communities of Hawthorne, El Segundo, Lennox, and Southern Inglewood. The Hospital was renamed in honor of former US senator and then-presidential candidate Robert F. Kennedy who was assassinated by Sirhan Sirhan in Los Angeles on June 6, 1968. The Hospital was purchased by Catholic Healthcare West in 1989, and underwent numerous expansions before numerous lawsuits and budgetary issues with the hospital's parent company forced its closure in January 1, 2005.

== History ==
Hawthorne Community Hospital opened as a maternity hospital in December 24, 1924 as both the city and region were experiencing rapid growth, due in no small part as an extension of the greater-Los Angeles area's population boom during the 1920s and 1930s. On January 10, 1954; the hospital was awarded $550,000 ($6,218,210.04 in 2023) from the University of Southern California as part of a grant to expand the school's medical program. Numerous services continued to expand through the hospital given its size and location adjacent to Hawthorne Boulevard, with the facility receiving its first expansion in 1970. A second facility under the same name was opened in 1964 to serve as a smaller 73-bed outpatient clinic. In November 1984; the hospital was renamed as Robert F. Kennedy Medical Center in honor of former senator Robert F. Kennedy who was assassinated in Los Angeles on June 6, 1968 during an appearance as a part of his presidential campaign. That same year; the hospital received an expansion as part of a jointly funded grant with Centinela Hospital Medical Center in Inglewood to improve emergency services in the area. The hospital was designated by the state's welfare board to treat patients qualifying under Medi-Cal.

== Decline ==
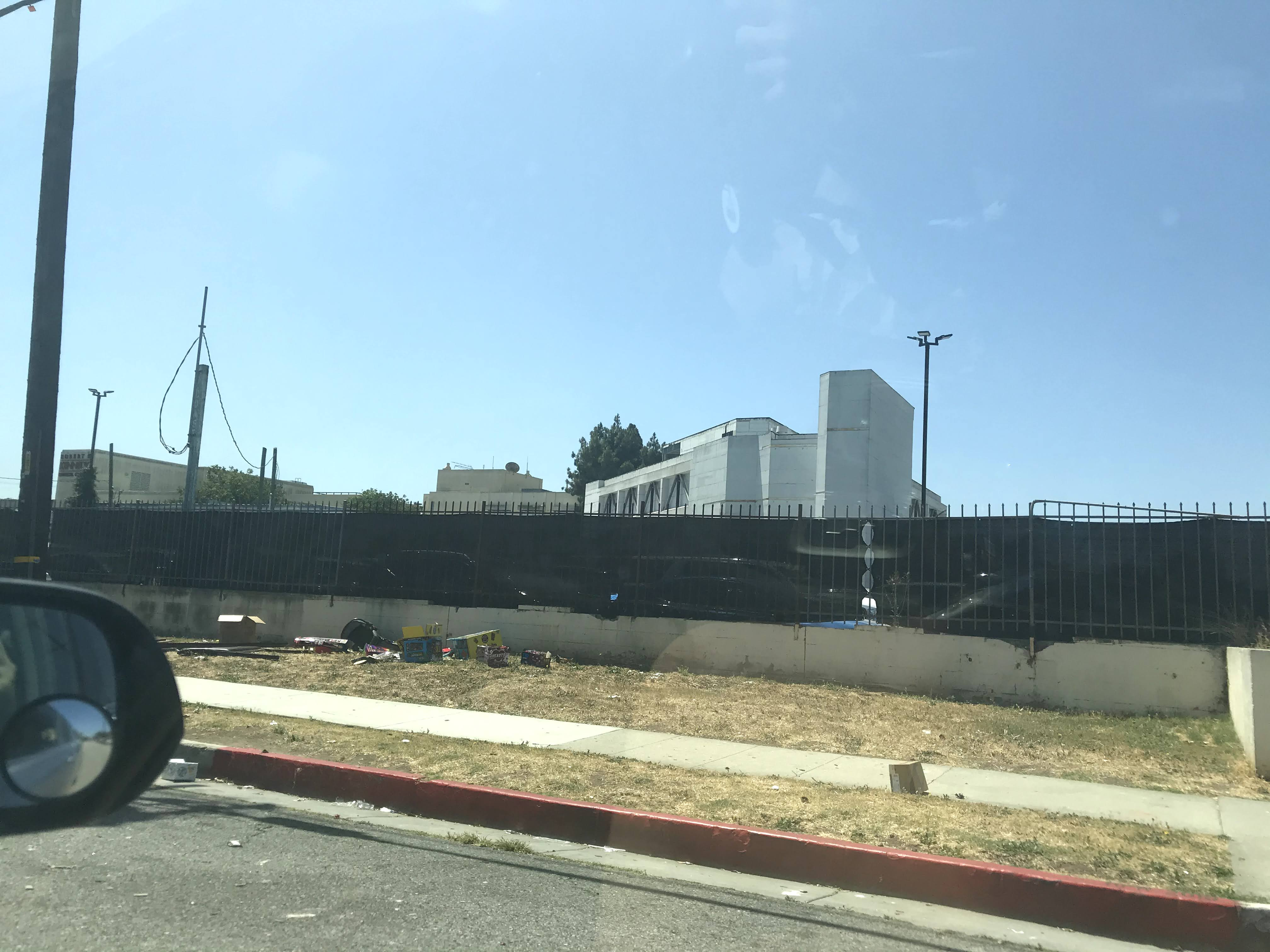
The former patient tower (completed in 1999)

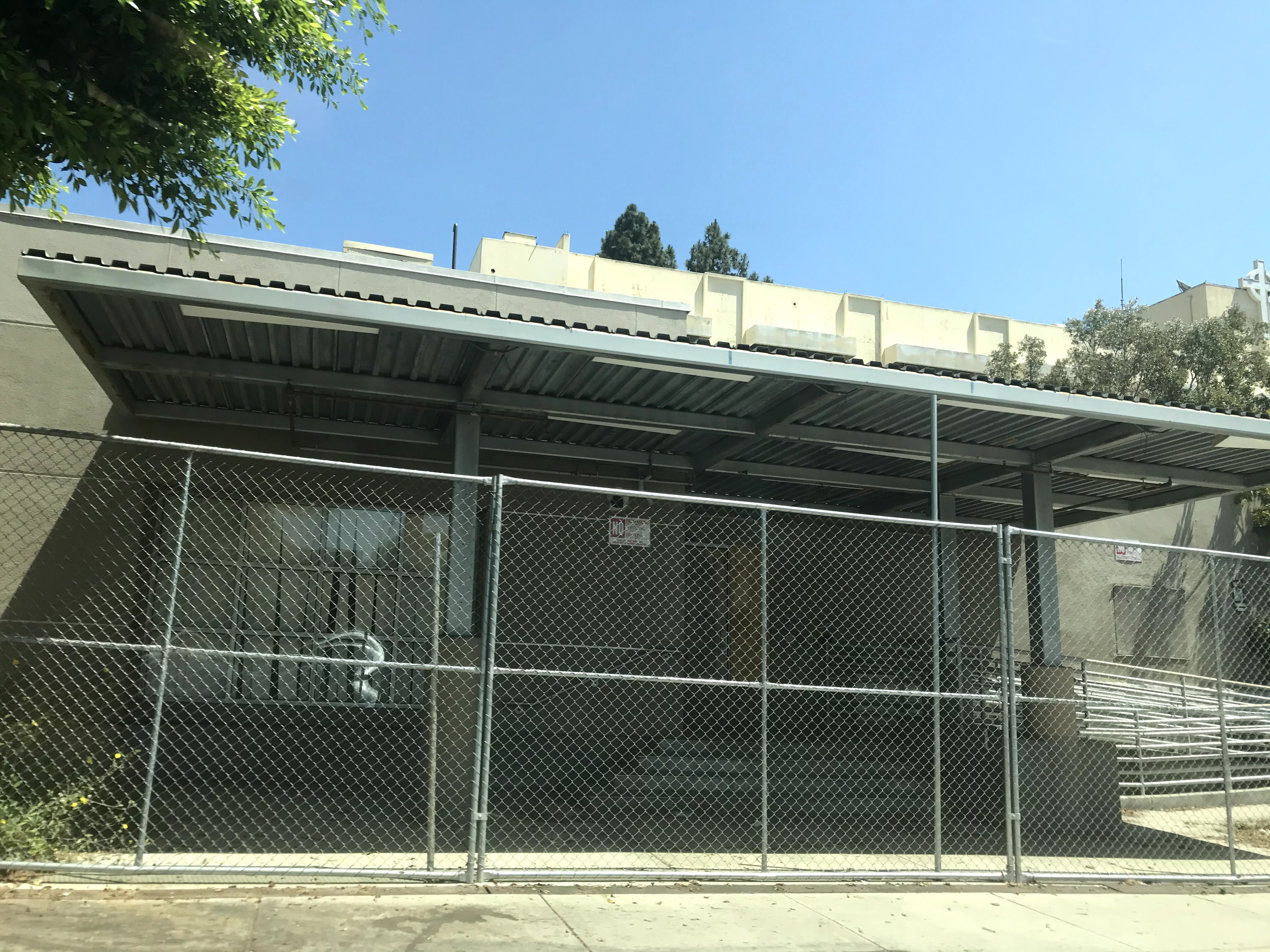
The former emergency entrance

In 1989 the hospital was purchased by Catholic Healthcare West, however; the end of the Cold War led to numerous defense sector layoffs across the region. Hawthorne's local economy was particularly affected as younger families began to relocate out of the area; leading the hospital to cease maternity services in 1991. In an effort to modernize the facility to meet local demand; Catholic West allocated funding to renovate the hospital in two phases, the first in 1996 and the second in 1999. Despite the new expansions to the facility; the hospital fell victim to the decline of the local area as a majority of patients treated were either underinsured or uninsured. The hospital also forged numerous affiliations with several nonprofit foundations within the region in an effort to allocate further funds for another expansion planned for 2001. The hospital was unable to fund their tertiary expansion in 2001, but resumed maternity services that same year. Despite the efforts to grow fiscally via the hospital's foundation; the state refused to grant any further funding to the facility, and it was announced on On September 24, 2004, it was announced that Catholic Healthcare West would be closing the hospital at the start of the new year. Former CEO Larry Stahl estimated that the expenses within the hospital had steadily exceeded a net loss of $77 million since 1999. The hospital closed permanently on January 1, 2005.

== Post-Closure ==
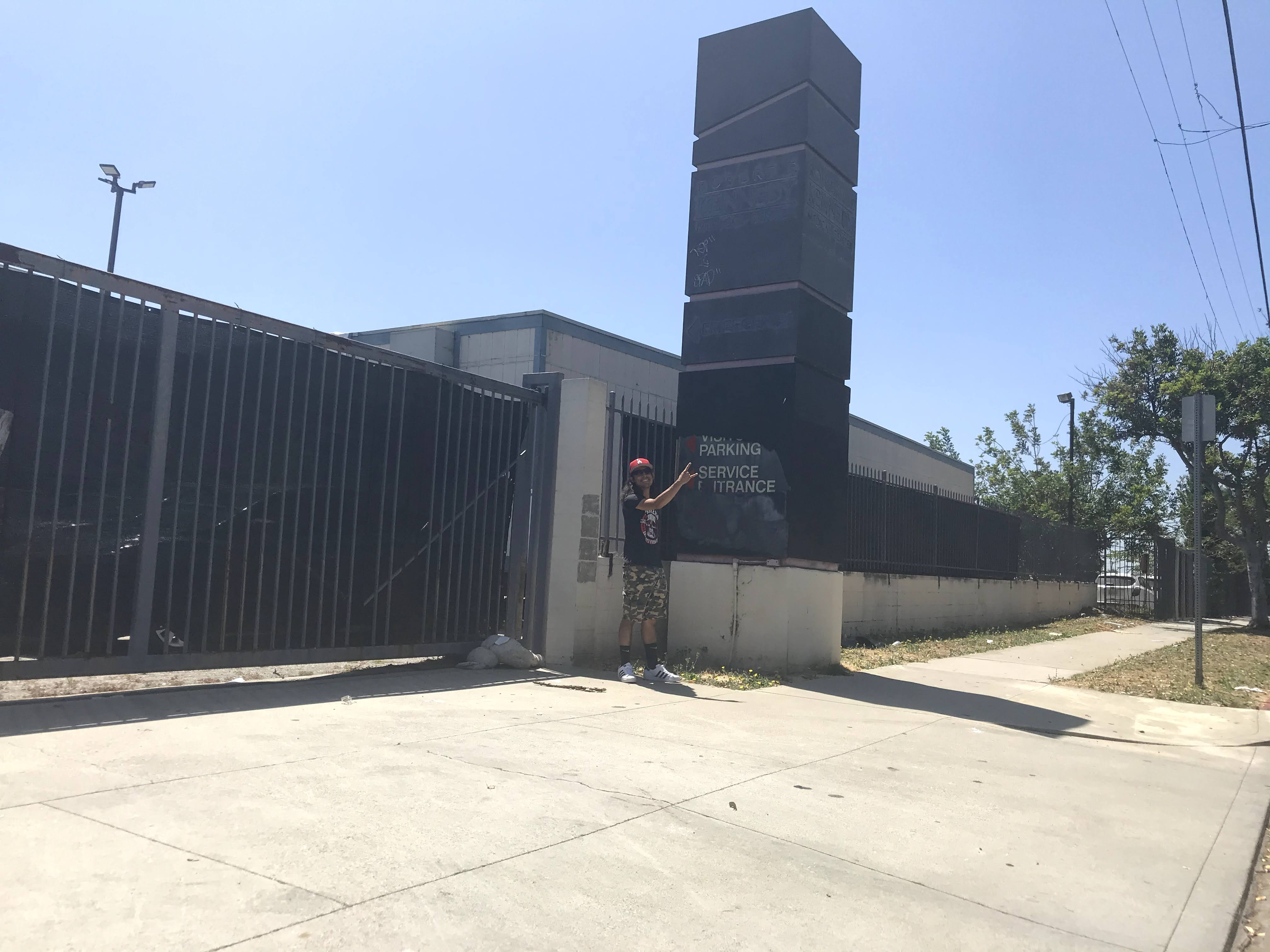
The former service entrance sign

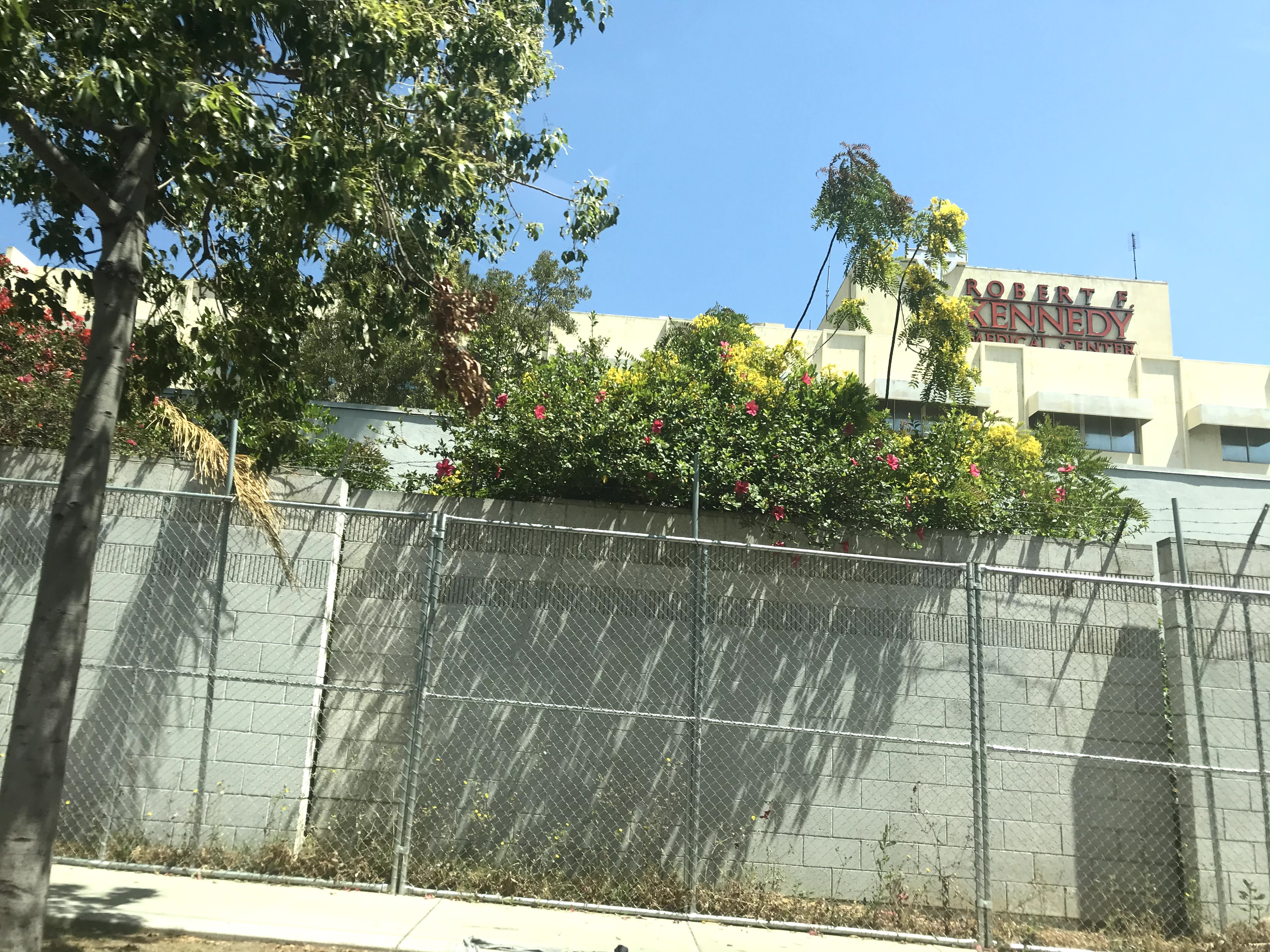
The first floor windows boarded over

As of 2023; numerous medical offices still operate directly east of the former hospital. The Hospital was occasionally utilized as a film site for the show Dexter in 2013. On April 12, 2015, a fire broke out on the ground floor; although the fire was successfully brought under control and contained to the basement entrance area and storage room, heavy smoke and partial fire damage occurred. As of 2023; the current property owners have fenced off numerous entrances to the hospital and began demolishing smaller structures in the parking lot. Security regularly patrols the property and motion sensors were also installed outside of the former entrances.

== Lawsuits ==
In 1970, the hospital was under investigation by the California Unemployment Insurance Appeals Board after their hiring processes came into question after allegations of numerous medical staff were hired with fraudulent medical licenses. The investigation later yielded no definitive evidence, and the case was dismissed in October 1971.

In 1982, Dr. Milton Avol sued the hospital after he was placed on suspension after an internal investigation later found his practices to be "questionable" as numerous emergency room patients accused him of neglectful practice. The California State medical board found Avol's case to be under-researched and the matter was ultimately dismissed in 1984.

In 1994, the California Department of Health Services was awarded $1.4 million from the hospital after misreporting their expenses from 1981 to 1993.

In 1996, the hospital sued the state department of health services, claiming their funding was rescinded, limiting their ability to treat patients under Medi-Cal, or state assisted medical insurance. The state welfare board later ruled against the hospital, claiming the hospital owed the state $1.5 million in expenses provided, though the ruling was later overturned in 1998 but the state was awarded $552,000 from the hospital as a result.

In 1997, a former nurse sued the hospital on the grounds of discriminatory termination after it had been revealed that the hospital overlooked multiple racist complaints in the workplace.

== See also ==
- St. Luke Medical Center
- Linda Vista Community Hospital
- Centinela Hospital Medical Center
- Hawthorne Plaza Shopping Center
