= Arroyo del Valle Sanitarium =

Former Sanitarium (1918–1960)

Geography
- Location: Livermore, California, United States
- Coordinates: 37°40′28″N 121°45′16″W

Organization
- Type: Specialist

Services
- Speciality: Tuberculosis

History
- Opened: 1918
- Closed: August 1960

Links
- Lists: Hospitals in California

Arroyo del Valle Sanitarium, originally opened as Del Valle Preventorium, was a sanitarium located in Livermore, California, United States that specialized in the treatment of tuberculosis. The hospital campus originally spanned over 160 acres. Upon opening in 1918, the hospital had a capacity of 280 patients. This was later expanded to 300. The buildings were designed by architect Henry H. Meyers of San Francisco. Originally opened as a private institution, Alameda County took over operations of the hospital in 1925.

In 1919, Dr. Chessley Bush was named medical superintendent of the sanitarium. He held the position for more than 30 years.

In 1923, Del Valle Farm was opened next to the sanatorium as a children's tuberculosis ward. The farm was eventually incorporated into the sanitarium in the 1920s. In 1949, James T. Duncan named the medical superintendent of the sanitarium until its closure. He had previously served as the director of Stony Brook Sanatorium in Kern County before moving to Livermore.

The sanitarium went into decline after Streptomycin became the main treatment for tuberculosis during the 1940s and 1950s. By 1959, the sanitarium only had 148 patients. Closure of the asylum commenced on July 1, 1960, after authorization of the Alameda County Board of Supervisors, with the last patients being removed in August 1960. Upon closure the remaining 90 patients were moved to the tuberculosis ward at Fairmont Hospital in San Leandro.

== Post-closure ==
The asylum sat abandoned for a number of years after 1960, with the land being maintained by Alameda County. Heavy rains collapsed the upper floors of many buildings. A majority of the windows were knocked out over the years. Vandalism and theft were common on the grounds and several buildings were burned down.

In 1976, a nonprofit organization named Buenas Vidas Youth Ranch leased part of the asylum grounds to use as center for their activities. The organization was a youth counselling group focused on youths aged 12–21. Volunteers cleaned up part of the campus grounds and also renovated one of the buildings near the main entrance, renaming it the "Rienecker House" after a Livermore High School student who was killed in an automobile accident the previous year. By 1987, Buenas Vidas had renovated other buildings which they used for camp activities. In 1988 concerns were brought forward about continued ranch operations due to asbestos in the buildings. By 1989, the grounds were acquired by the East Bay Regional Park District.

During the 1990s, the buildings were demolished and a summer camp named Camp Arroyo was constructed on the former grounds. The grounds are managed by the East Bay Regional Park District.

== In popular culture ==
In 1973, a horror movie named Warlock Moon was filmed on the grounds.

== See also ==
- List of hospitals in California
