= Santa Paula Hospital =

Coordinates: 34.365767°N 119.065154°W

- Ventura County

Geography
- Location: 825 N 10th St, Santa Paula, California, United States

Organization
- Care system: Medicare, Medicaid, Private
- Type: Community
- Affiliated university: None

Services
- Beds: 49

History
- Founded: 2006

Links
- Website: http://www.vchca.org/hospitals/santa-paula-hospital
- Lists: Hospitals in California

Santa Paula Hospital (SPH) is a hospital in Santa Paula, California, United States. The hospital is a campus of the Ventura County Medical Center. SPH has 145 full-time employees, 30 shared patient beds, and 19 private patient rooms.

== Services ==
SPH has departments in radiology, surgery and intensive care. The hospital operates a 24/7 emergency room.

== History ==
Santa Paula Memorial Hospital was founded in 1961 and was built entirely with community donations.

On December 26, 2003, after years of financial trouble, Santa Paula Memorial Hospital filed Chapter 11 bankruptcy and was forced to close. The County of Ventura purchased the hospital in September 2005 for $2.75 million. After spending $4.5 million on renovations and repairs, the hospital was reopened on July 13, 2006. The hospital performed well financially.

Three years after reopening, the hospital was noted to be successful. The hospital building will not meet 2030 state seismic safety requirements.
