= Marian Regional Medical Center =

- Dignity Health

Geography
- Location: 1400 E Church St, Santa Maria, California, United States
- Coordinates: 34°57′05″N 120°24′48″W

Organization
- Religious affiliation: Catholic

Services
- Emergency department: Level II trauma center
- Beds: 353

Helipads
- Helipad: FAA LID: 1CL8
Number	Length		Surface
Number	ft	m	Surface
H1	48x48	15x15	Concrete

History
- Former name: Our Lady of Perpetual Help Hospital (1940-1967)
- Opened: 1940

Links
- Website: Official website
- Lists: Hospitals in California

Marian Regional Medical Center is a Level II trauma center located in Santa Maria, California. It is part of the Dignity Health network.

== History ==
The hospital opened in 1940 as Our Lady of Perpetual Help Hospital.

In 1965 construction began on what is now Marian Hospital after land was donated by George Allan Hancock.
