= Little Company of Mary Hospital (Torrance) =

Providence Little Company of Mary Medical Center Torrance
- Providence Health & Services

Geography
- Location: Torrance, California, United States
- Coordinates: 33.8386°N 118.35713°W

Organization
- Care system: Private
- Type: Community
- Religious affiliation: Little Company of Mary
- Affiliated university: None

Services
- Beds: 317

History
- Founded: 1960

Links
- Website: california.providence.org/torrance
- Lists: Hospitals in California

Providence Little Company of Mary Medical Center is a Roman Catholic hospital in Torrance, California, United States. The hospital was founded by the Sisters of the Little Company of Mary, and is part of the Providence Health & Services system.

== See also ==
- Little Company of Mary Hospital (San Pedro)
