= John F. Kennedy Memorial Hospital =

Coordinates: 33°42′23″N 116°14′08″W

- Tenet Healthcare

Geography
- Location: Indio, California, United States

Services
- Beds: 145

History
- Founded: 1966

Links
- Website: www.desertcarenetwork.com/locations/detail/jfk-memorial-hospital
- Lists: Hospitals in California

John F. Kennedy Memorial Hospital is a Tenet Healthcare owned hospital in Indio, California, United States.

== General ==
It is a General Acute Care Hospital in Indio with Basic Emergency Services as of 2006. One of three hospitals in the Coachella Valley, it has one of the state's busiest maternity wards. In 2005, it opened a new maternity center as part of a hospital expansion plan for more surgical rooms, intensive care units and a new concrete emergency heliport. As of 2008, the hospital is a 145-bed capacity facility.

== History ==
The facility originally opened as "Indio Community Hospital" in 1966, with 112 beds, built on land previously owned by founder Dr. Reynaldo Carreon (the namesake for Dr. Carreon Boulevard). In 1975, the hospital was purchased from American Medicorp, a national health care chain, by the owners of Valley Memorial Hospital also in Indio. Valley Memorial was originally known as Casita Hospital (until it was renamed in mid-1964) and had opened in the late 1940s.

Tenet Healthcare (then known as National Medical Enterprises) purchased the hospital in June 1979. which was renamed John F. Kennedy Memorial Hospital in 1984.
