= Kaiser Fontana Medical Center =

- Kaiser Permanente
- Location within California

Geography
- Location: Fontana, Inland Empire, California, United States
- Coordinates: 34.0729°N 117.4322°W

Organization
- Type: General

Services
- Beds: 664

Helipads
- Helipad: Yes

History
- Founded: 1943

Links
- Website: kaiserpermanente.org
- Lists: Hospitals in California

Kaiser Fontana Medical Center is a large Kaiser Permanente medical facility and 664-bed hospital in Fontana, California. Built in 1955 to replace the smaller hospital at the Kaiser Steel Mill, the facility now serves over 400,000 members of Kaiser Permanente's health care plans in the area. The hospital is accredited by the Joint Commission. According to U.S. News & World Report, the hospital performs highly in diabetes & endocrinology, ear, nose & throat, geriatrics, pulmonology, and urology.

In the most recent year with available data, Kaiser Fontana had 90,675 emergency department visits, 26,640 admissions, performed 4,956 inpatient and 21,790 outpatient surgeries.

== History ==
In 1943, Henry J. Kaiser and Dr. Sidney R. Garfield opened a 50-bed hospital, housing six physicians for the 3000 employees and their families at the new Kaiser Steel Mill in Fontana, California, offering a then revolutionary pre-paid health care plan for $0.60/week for adults, and $0.30/week for children. In 1945, the Kaiser Permanente health plan was opened to the public, providing the opportunity of affordable health care to the residents of Fontana. Following the end of World War II, as the steel mill and community continued to grow, the demand rapidly outgrew the small facility, and in 1955, the hospital was moved to its current location on Sierra Ave. It has undergone an almost constant pace of expansion and remodel to reach its current state, with major expansions about once a decade; it now contains over 400 beds, houses over 1,500 doctors, and employs 10,000.

== New construction ==
In 2009, construction started on a 'replacement hospital' on the Fontana Campus. The new 7-story facility, being built to meet requirements of CA Senate Bill (SB) 1953 and slated to open in 2013, will have 314 beds and offer major technological and systematic improvements over the current, aging facility.

The new hospital is pursuing LEED certification by the US Green Building Council. Environmentally friendly features of the building include: energy efficient lighting, use of reclaimed water for landscaping and cooling towers, dual pane exterior window glazing, and natural day lighting.

== Medical education ==
The hospital operates the following programs: family medicine residency (est. 1975), internal medicine residency (est. 2013), psychiatry residency (est. 2014), sports medicine fellowship, geriatrics fellowship, and child and adolescent psychiatry fellowship.
