= Little Company of Mary Hospital (San Pedro) =

- Providence Health & Services

Geography
- Location: San Pedro, California, United States
- Coordinates: 33.73831°N 118.30507°W

Organization
- Care system: non-profit
- Type: Community
- Affiliated university: None

Services
- Beds: 587

History
- Opened: 1925

Links
- Website: http://california.providence.org/san-pedro/
- Lists: Hospitals in California

Little Company of Mary Hospital is a hospital in San Pedro, California, US. The hospital was founded in 1909 by Mrs. Lillian B. Mullen, a graduate nurse and physician from New York.

== History ==
The hospital began in the old Clarence Hotel, which was situated on the old Nob Hill in 1909. Starting in 1915, Nob Hill was being demolished to make way for Harbor Boulevard, which caused the hospital to be relocated. The first permanent building constructed for the hospital was located on 6th Street and Patton Avenue. and was dedicated in 1925. Throughout its history, the hospital has been through numerous remodeling and construction projects and several name changes. As well as a new hospital tower built in 1961.

The hospital aligned with the Sisters of the Little Company of Mary in the early 1990s. The affiliation with the Sisters of Providence took place in 1998 and the hospital (now medical center) is currently a part of Providence Health & Services.

== See also ==
- Little Company of Mary Hospital (Torrance)
