= Palmdale Regional Medical Center =

- Universal Health Services (UHS)
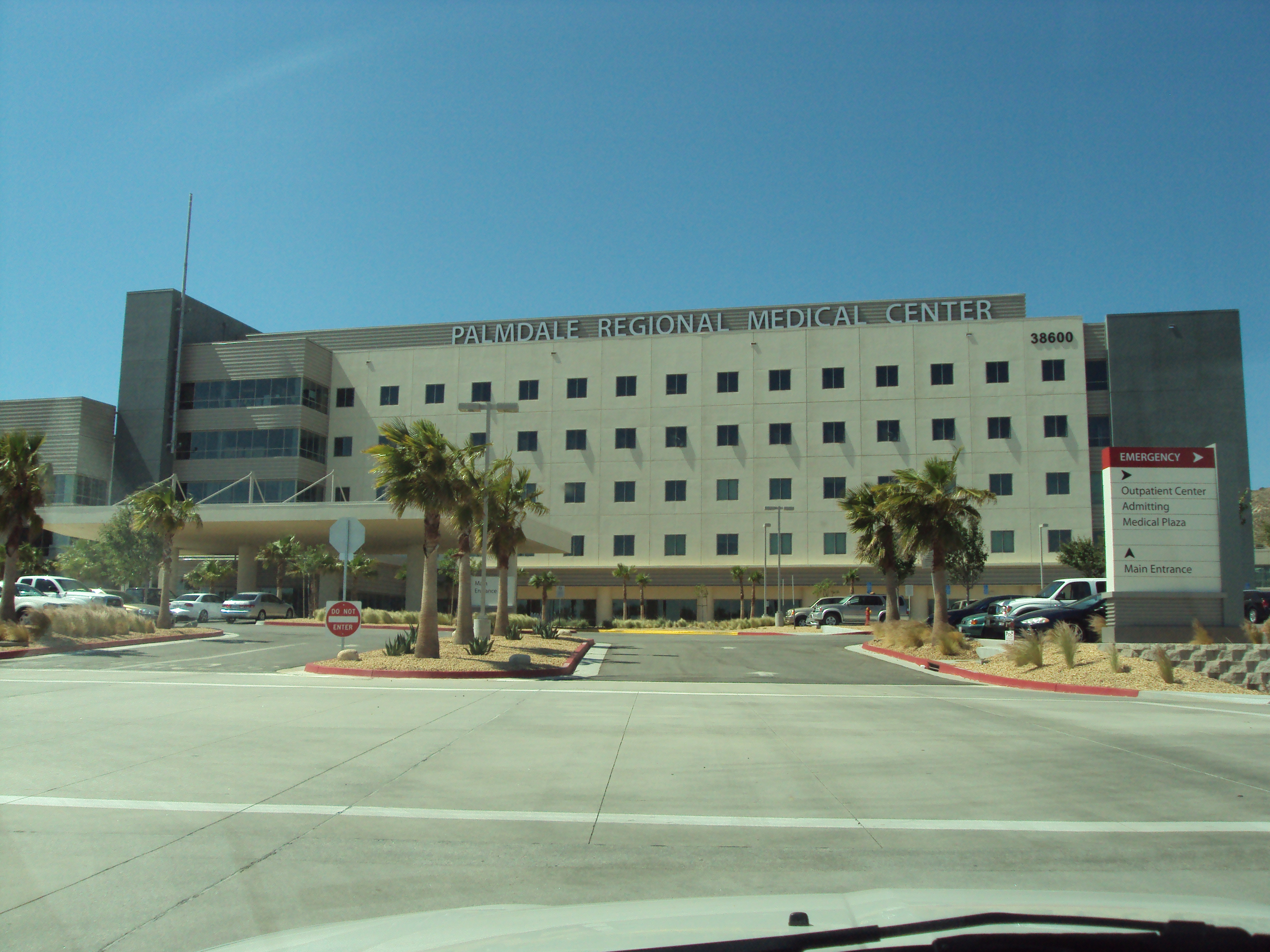

Geography
- Location: Palmdale, California, United States
- Coordinates: 34°35′06″N 118°08′39″W

Organization
- Care system: Private, for profit
- Type: Community
- Affiliated university: None

Services
- Emergency department: 35 Bed General with STEMI cardiac reception
- Beds: 239 upon final completion

Helipads
- Helipad: FAA LID: 50CN

History
- Founded: 2010

Links
- Website: www.palmdaleregional.com
- Lists: Hospitals in California

Palmdale Regional Medical Center is a private hospital located in Palmdale, California. It is one of five member hospitals of Southwest Healthcare.

The facility includes a rehabilitation center, 190 acute care beds, inpatient and outpatient surgery, a primary stroke center, cardiac services, and a 24-hour emergency department. The facility also features a 35-bed emergency department, the second largest in the Antelope Valley area, and a heliport (FAA LID: 50CN).

The hospital is 320,000 square feet (30,000 m^{2}), and provides 775 jobs to the area. It opened with 127 beds, with another 44 beds approved to be added 8 months after opening. The hospital will be able to expand to 239 beds at maximum development.

This hospital was the most expensive hospital project Universal Health Services has ever undertaken at US$200 million. Adjacent to the hospital is a 60,000-square-foot (5,600 m^{2}) medical office tower, called the Palmdale Medical Plaza. The hospital complex will also feature apartment housing for those who need assisted living. The hospital complex is 34.17 acres (13.83 ha). This acute care facility is the only hospital in Palmdale, the largest city in California without a hospital prior to opening in December 2010.
