= Corona Regional Medical Center =

- Universal Health Services Inc.

Geography
- Location: 800 South Main Street, Corona, California, United States
- Coordinates: 33.87303°N 117.56839°W

Organization
- Care system: Public
- Type: Community

Services
- Emergency department: 41
- Beds: 238
- Helipad: No

History
- Opened: 1933

Links
- Website: Corona Regional Medical Center
- Lists: Hospitals in California

Corona Regional Medical Center is a hospital in Corona, California that is owned and operated by Universal Health Services. The hospital is a 238-bed community hospital network comprising a 160-bed acute care hospital and a 78-bed rehabilitation campus. It is certified by The Joint Commission, employs more than 1,000 trained healthcare workers, and has a medical staff of approximately 300 physicians representing more than 40 specialties.

== History ==
Beginning as the Corona Community Hospital in 1933, the hospital has changed and expanded to meet the needs of the rapidly growing communities of Corona, Norco and Eastvale. In 1992, Corona Community Hospital merged with Circle City Medical Center, and the resulting entity became Corona Regional Medical Center. In 2004, CRMC became one of the hospitals owned and operated by a subsidiary of Universal Health Services, Inc.

== Services ==
- Acute Care Services: Allergy Medicine, Bloodless Medicine, Breast Imaging Center (3D Digital Mammography), Cardiology & Cardiac Catheterization, Diagnostic Imaging (MRI, CT, Angio, Nuc Med), Emergency Services, Gastroenterology, Intensive Care Unit, Laboratory Services, Neurology, OB/GYN, Oncology, Orthopedic/Joint/Spine, Pediatrics, Inpatient Physical Therapy/Occupational Therapy/Speech Therapy, Pulmonary, Surgical Services, Urology, Vascular Services, The Wound Care Center ® (Hyperbaric Oxygen Therapy)
- Rehabilitation Services: Behavioral Health- Inpatient & Outpatient, Skilled Nursing/Subacute Care, Home Health & Hospice, Palliative Care

== Awards and Accolades ==
- Home Care Elite Award 2011, 2012 & 2013
- American College of Radiology: Accreditation in MRI, CT, Nuclear Neducubem Ultrasound and Mammography
- CEP (California Emergency Physicians Group) Award - PA Site of the Year
- College of American Pathologist (CAP) Accreditation
- HealthGrades 5 Star Award in Gynecology and Maternity

== Leadership ==
- Sam Itani, Chief Executive Officer
- Morgan Topper, Chief Operating Officer
- Kyle Kim, Chief Financial Officer
- Phyllis Snyder, Chief Nursing Officer
- Martin Kleinbart, Director of Strategic Business Development
