= Anaheim General Hospital =

Former hospital in California

Anaheim General Hospital was a 142-bed hospital in Anaheim, California, United States. It closed in 2013 after federal authorities withdrew its Medicare and Medi-Cal support. It was owned and operated by Tustin-based Pacific Health Corp, and included emergency and acute care.

== Closure ==
The hospital closed permanently on May 23, 2013. The closure was prompted by a July 2009 decision by federal authorities to withdraw Medicare and Medi-Cal support due to series of failed inspections. Issues related to unclean and unsafe equipment and lack of proper medications in stock in the operating department. Prior to the closure, Pacific Health Corp. endured a seven million dollar fine related to improper collection of premiums without coverage and payroll issues.
