= College Hospital =

Geography
- Location: Ceritos, California, United States
- Coordinates: 33.88432°N 118.10294°W

Services
- Beds: 125

Links
- Lists: Hospitals in California

College Hospital is an acute psychiatric hospital in Cerritos, California.

College Hospital has been open since 1973 and has specialty programs in dealing with geriatric, adolescent and pediatric mental health issues. There is also a program specifically created to address problems in the Latino community with the services of Spanish speaking and bi-cultural psychiatrists, psychologists, social workers and counselors.

The umbrella College Hospital organization has three hospitals in California located in Cerritos, Costa Mesa and Long Beach (formally called Pacific Hospital). They also staff a 24-hour on-call crisis team. The Costa Mesa facility has medical, surgical and both adult and teen psychiatry units.

College Hospital Long Beach is the only facility with 24-hour emergency services available on site. It is a Full-service, for-profit, teaching hospital with acute care and psychiatric units on site.
