= St. Jude Medical Center =

Coordinates: 33°53′41″N 117°55′38″W

- Providence St. Joseph Health

Geography
- Location: 101 E. Valencia Mesa Drive, Fullerton, CA 92835, Fullerton, California, United States

Organization
- Care system: Private
- Type: Community
- Network: Providence St. Joseph Health

Services
- Beds: 320

History
- Founded: 1957

Links
- Website: www.stjudemedicalcenter.org
- Lists: Hospitals in California

St. Jude Medical Center is a faith-based, not-for-profit hospital, located in Fullerton, California, which was established by the Sisters of St. Joseph of Orange in 1957.

Part of the St. Joseph Health System, St. Jude Medical Center serves as a quaternary and referral center for a variety of patient services, including one of California's only accredited programs in spinal cord injury, brain injury, and comprehensive stroke rehabilitation. Other areas of specialty include: high- and low-risk maternity, digestive diseases and GI surgery, orthopedics and joint replacement, neurosciences, women's health, rehabilitation, cardiac care, robotic and minimally-invasive surgery, and cancer care.

In 2014, the hospital opened the $255 million Northwest Tower, which along with the Southwest Tower built several years earlier, created private patient rooms. Key areas of expansion included three entire floors dedicated to maternity services and another floor encompassing 14 "smart" surgical suites, including a "hybrid" cardiovascular suite with robotic c-arm imaging, and a dedicated neurosurgery suite with intraoperative MRI. Additional surgical technology includes da Vinci surgical robots as well as the superDimension robotic system for lung cancer treatment.

== Specialty Centers of Care ==
- The Virginia K. Crosson Cancer Institute
- Ann G. Fetters Diagnostic Imaging Center
- The St. Jude Centers for Rehabilitation and Wellness
- The Kathryn T. McCarty Breast Center
- Fred A. Jordan Radiation Oncology Center
- The St. Jude Neurosciences Institute
- Center for Thoracic and Esophageal Diseases
- The St. Jude Knott Family Endoscopy Center
- Orthopedics and Sports Medicine
- Cardiac Services
- Sleep Center
- Chronic Pain Program
- Synergy Medical Fitness Center
- St. Jude Advanced Wound Care and Hyperbaric Medicine
- Maternity Services, including Fetal Diagnostic Center and Neonatal Intensive Care Unit
- Minimally-invasive and robotic surgery
- Women's health, including advanced gynecological care

== Affiliations ==
St. Jude Medical Center is one of three St. Joseph Health hospitals in Orange County – each founded by the Sisters of St. Joseph of Orange—part of a 14-hospital system within the western United States that includes outpatient services, fetal diagnostic center, as well as inpatient services. In 2014, a partnership with Hoag Hospital created an integrated health system called St. Joseph Hoag Health.

== History ==
The Sisters of St. Joseph of Carondelet began operating their first hospital in Eureka, California in 1919 in response to the Spanish Flu epidemic. The Order moved its mother house to Orange County in 1922. They acquired Fullerton General Hospital, a historic facility designed by Frederick Eley, in 1931, but it did not meet postwar standards for operation. The Sisters began raising the one million dollars estimated as necessary to build a new hospital.

In 1953 a group of physicians, led by Ramiro Fernandez, M.D., met with the sisters to see about building a new hospital. It was Dr. Fernandez's wife, Emily, who suggested the name St. Jude, the patron saint of desperate situations.

A businessman, Miles Sharkey, donated land in western Fullerton with the stipulation that it be used to build a hospital. Of the 17 acres (6.9 ha) acquired by the Sisters, the first 7.5 acres (3.0 ha) was deeded to them for $10. On November 24, 1953, the hilltop property on which St. Jude Hospital was later built was blessed and dedicated.

St. Jude's Hospital was publicly dedicated on May 11, 1957, with 2000 spectators in attendance as well as dignitaries including Congressman James B. Utt and Cardinal James McIntyre, Archbishop of Los Angeles.
