= VA Palo Alto Health Care System =

United States Department of Veterans Affairs healthcare group located in California

- Location: United States
- Services: Healthcare
- Website: www.paloalto.va.gov

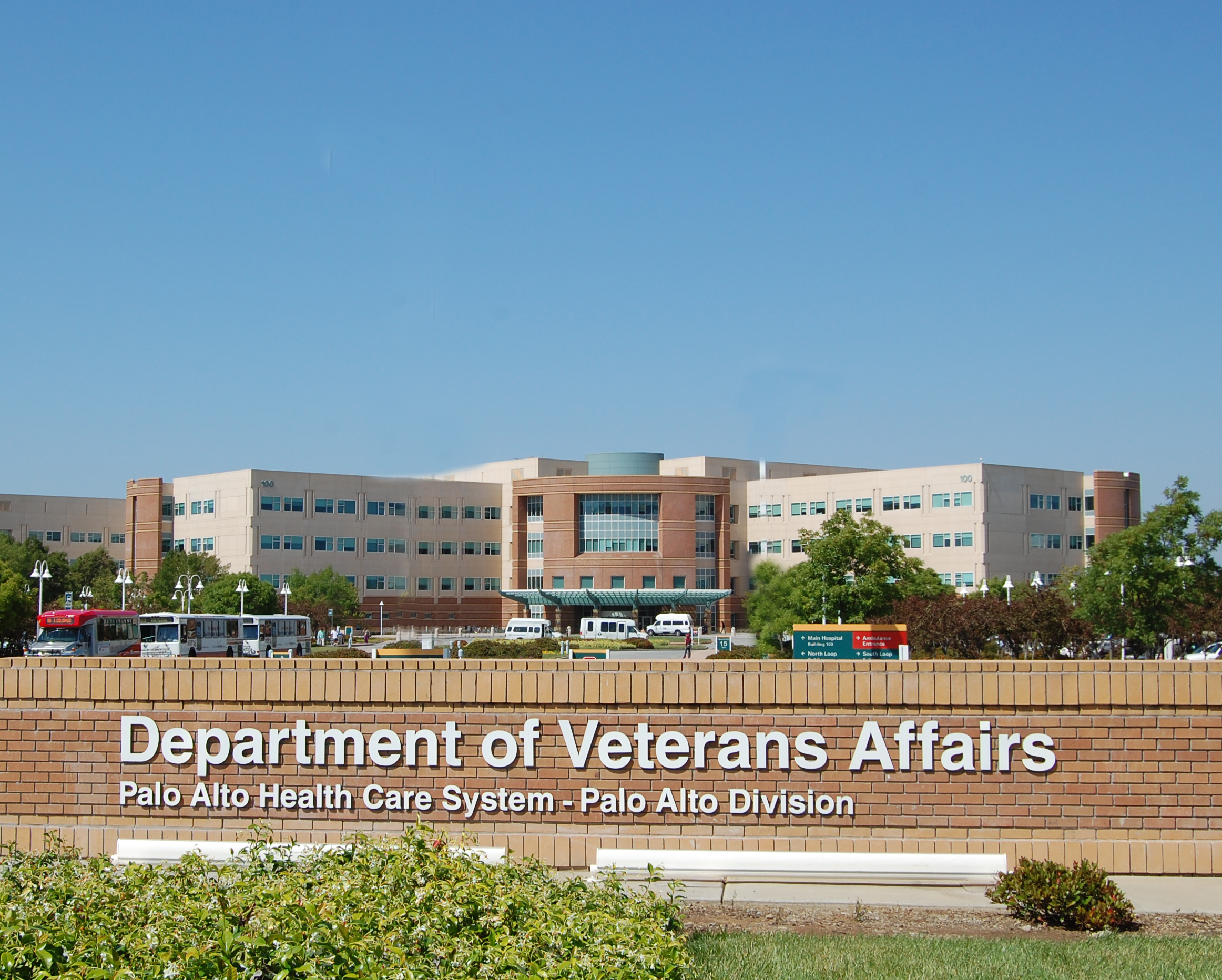
VA Palo Alto Health Care System

The VA Palo Alto Health Care System (VAPAHCS) is a United States Department of Veterans Affairs healthcare group located in California that consists of three inpatient facilities (VA Palo Alto Hospital, Menlo Park VA Hospital, and Livermore VA Hospital), plus seven outpatient clinics in San Jose, Capitola, Monterey, and Fremont.

== Description ==
VAPAHCS is a teaching hospital associated with the Stanford University School of Medicine. It provides patient care services as well as education and research. Health care is provided in areas of medicine, surgery, psychiatry, rehabilitation, neurology, oncology, dentistry, geriatrics, and extended care. At VAPAHCS, 1,300 university residents, interns, and students are trained annually.

VAPAHCS operates nearly 900 beds, including three nursing homes and a 100-bed homeless domiciliary serving more than 85,000 enrolled veterans.

== Treatment centers ==
VAPAHCS is home to a variety of regional treatment centers, including a Polytrauma Rehabilitation Center, Spinal Cord Injury Center, a Comprehensive Rehabilitation Center, a Traumatic Brain Injury Center, the Western Blind Rehabilitation Center, a Geriatric Research Educational and Clinical Center, a Homeless Veterans Rehabilitation program, and the National Center for Post-Traumatic Stress Disorder (PTSD).

== Research ==
VAPAHCS maintains the third largest research program in the VA with extensive research centers in geriatrics, mental health, Alzheimer's disease, spinal cord regeneration, schizophrenia, Rehabilitation Research and Development Center, HIV research, and a Health Economics Resource Center.
