= College of Osteopathic Medicine of the Pacific =

Medical school in Pomona, California, U.S.

- Other name: COMP
- Type: Private
- Established: 1977; 49 years ago
- Parent institution: Western University of Health Sciences
- Budget: $78.25 million
- Dean: Paula M. Crone, D.O.
- Faculty: 79
- Students: 1,110 (total)
- Location: Pomona, California, U.S. 34.0587°N 117.7425°W
- Campus: Urban, 22 acres (8.9 ha)
- Website: www.westernu.edu/osteopathic

The College of Osteopathic Medicine of the Pacific (COMP) is a private medical school for osteopathic medicine located in downtown Pomona, California. The college opened in 1977 as the only osteopathic medical school west of the Rocky Mountains. COMP was the founding program of Western University of Health Sciences (WesternU), which now has eight colleges in addition to COMP, each offering professional degrees in various fields of healthcare. COMP has a single four-year program, conferring the Doctor of Osteopathic Medicine (D.O.) degree. Graduates are eligible to practice medicine in all 50 states and more than 85 countries.

In 2011, the College of Osteopathic Medicine of the Pacific opened a branch campus in Lebanon, Oregon called COMP-Northwest. COMP is accredited by the American Osteopathic Association's Commission on Osteopathic College Accreditation.

== History ==
Health Education Center (HEC) HEC is the main building for the College of Osteopathic Medicine of the Pacific. The building first opened for classes in early 2010

The College of Osteopathic Medicine of the Pacific first opened in 1977, and was the first osteopathic medical school to open in California after the merger between the California osteopathic medical board and the M.D. board in 1961, the California College of Osteopathic Physicians and Surgeons became an M.D. granting school (now the UC Irvine School of Medicine). In 1974, the Osteopathic Physicians and Surgeons of California voted to move forward on planning the development of a new osteopathic medical school in California. After acquiring a facility in Pomona and recruiting Philip Pumerantz from Chicago to serve as president, the College of Osteopathic Medicine of the Pacific was founded in 1977. The first classes began in 1978, and the inaugural class of students graduated in 1982. That same year, in 1982, the American Osteopathic Association granted COMP full accreditation. At the time, COMP was the only osteopathic medical school west of the Rocky Mountains, and until 1997, when Touro University California opened in Vallejo, it was the only one in California.

In 1977, the College of Osteopathic Medicine of the Pacific opened its first outpatient clinic, and in 1988, the school opened the Mission Osteopathic Medical Center in downtown Pomona. In 1990, the Accrediting Commission for Senior Colleges and Universities of the Western Association of Schools and Colleges granted COMP candidacy status, and full accreditation was awarded in 1996. In August 1996, the college was restructured to form a university, which was named “Western University of Health Sciences," and COMP became one of the colleges in this university.

In 2010, the Pomona Patient Care Center and the Health Education Center opened as a part of a $100 million expansion project at Western University. The Health Education Center is a 180,000 square-foot teaching and research facility, and serves as the primary building on campus for COMP.

Since 1982, a total of 4,245 physicians have graduated from COMP and 64 percent of alumni live and practice in California. 44 percent of the 2010 graduating class entered a residency in California. In the 2024-2025 admission cycle, COMP's California campus received 5,433 applications, granted 881 interviews, and ultimately enrolled 227 students. The entering class of 2025 had an average Medical College Admission Test score of 509, and an average overall GPA of 3.82.

Graduates of COMP receive a Doctor of Osteopathic Medicine (D.O.) degree and are referred to as osteopathic physicians. Osteopathic physicians, like M.D. physicians, are complete physicians and are licensed to prescribe medication and perform surgery. Osteopathic physicians and M.D. physicians are very similar, but D.O. physicians receive additional training in the musculoskeletal system, and learn osteopathic manipulative medicine. Harrison's Principles of Internal Medicine describes the training of osteopathic physicians as "virtually indistinguishable" from that of M.D. physicians. D.O. physicians may choose to enter either a D.O. or an M.D. residency.

== Research ==
The College of Osteopathic Medicine of the Pacific publishes research on several subjects in the basic and clinical sciences. Research topics include the following: tuberculosis, Alzheimer's disease, skin cancer, Angelman syndrome, endangered species, and anatomy. Research is funded by the California Institute for Regenerative Medicine, the FRAXA Foundation, the National Institute of Child Health and Human Development, the National Institute on Drug Abuse, and the National Institutes of Health.

In a 2010 report published in the Annals of Internal Medicine, COMP was recognized as a top medical school in terms of its social mission, ranking higher than any other California medical school and higher than any other osteopathic medical school. COMP was also 12th in the number of primary care physicians it produced. In 2007, COMP was recognized by the Hispanic Business Journal as the 18th best medical school for Hispanics in the United States. In 2014, the U.S. News & World Report ranked COMP (WesternU) as 17th amongst all US medical schools for producing primary care residents.

== Academics ==
The first and second years of medical school at COMP focus on the basic sciences, and a systems-based approach to basic clinical sciences. Much of the curriculum at COMP is case-based, rather than lecture-based, especially during the second year. The Summer Medical Sciences Preparatory Program is an optional course for students interested in an introduction to gross anatomy, biochemistry, and osteopathic manipulative medicine. The Intensive Summer Anatomy Course is an optional course for students interested in anatomy.

The curriculum at COMP includes Interprofessional Education (IPE), a program that involves 9 colleges at WesternU. The IPE program aims to demonstrate an understanding of other health professions and to provide and promote a team approach to patient care and health care management, leading to improved patient care. While a debate exists on the effectiveness of interprofessional education in encouraging collaborative practice, IPE is becoming a more common component of medical school curriculum in the United States, and many groups, including the World Health Organization, view it as a means of reducing medical errors and improving the health care system.

The third and fourth years of training are clinically oriented, where students rotate through various specialties of medicine; the core rotations are internal medicine, family practice, surgery, OB/GYN, pediatrics, psychiatry, and osteopathic manipulative medicine, and they provide opportunities for students to develop clinical skills. The majority of third year core rotation sites are located in Southern California, including:

Patient Care Center (Pomona campus) Services include medical care, podiatry, dentistry, pharmacy, and optometry.

- Arrowhead Regional Medical Center
- Chino Valley Medical Center
- Community Memorial Hospital
- Downey Regional Medical Center
- Garfield Medical Center
- Kaiser Permanente, Fontana, California
- Pacific Hospital of Long Beach
- Patton State Hospital
- Rancho Los Amigos National Rehabilitation Center
- Riverside County Regional Medical Center
- WesternU Patient Care Centers

WesternU has a Patient Care Center (PCC) that offer medical care, podiatric, dentistry, pharmacy, and optometric services in Pomona, on the main campus. The Pomona Patient Care Center opened in May 2010, and serves more than 10,000 patients per year. Students from the different colleges at WesternU learn and develop clinical skills at the Patient Care Centers. COMP students may rotate at the Patient Care Center for family medicine, internal medicine, physical medicine and rehabilitation, and osteopathic manipulative medicine. During their fourth year, students complete sub-internships at hospitals with residency programs.

Students at COMP may choose to complete a master's degree in addition to their Doctor of Osteopathic Medicine. Three master's of science programs are offered through other colleges at Western University: a Master of Science in Biomedical Sciences, a Master of Science in Health Sciences, and a Master of Science in Medical Sciences.

The College of Osteopathic Medicine of the Pacific is affiliated with OPTI-West, an Osteopathic Post-Graduate Training Institute. Through OPTI-West the college works with hospitals to establish and maintain postdoctoral training programs. COMP is affiliated with various residency programs at hospitals such as Arrowhead Regional Medical Center, Riverside Regional Medical Center, San Diego Sports/Medicine and Family Health Center, and St. Mary's-Corwin Medical Center.

== College of Osteopathic Medicine of the Pacific, Northwest ==
In 2011, a satellite campus of COMP opened in Lebanon, Oregon; it is known as the College of Osteopathic Medicine of the Pacific Northwest (COMP-Northwest). The new 54,000 square-foot building is used to educate medical students during their first two years of training. During the third and fourth year of training, the students rotate in hospitals and clinics. Currently, only the medical program is offered at the Lebanon campus, although the university plans to eventually open additional colleges.

The inaugural class is composed of 107 students, selected from about 2,000 applicants. COMP-Northwest is the first new medical school to open in Oregon in over 100 years; currently, 5% of physicians practicing in Oregon are osteopathic physicians, a number that is expected to increase with the establishment of COMP-Northwest. John Kitzhaber, MD the former governor of Oregon and an emergency physician, delivered the keynote speech at the Convocation Ceremony for COMP-Northwest.

During the 76th Oregon Legislative Assembly, the Oregon State Senate passed a resolution to "congratulate the College of Osteopathic Medicine of the Pacific Northwest, thank the founders for their commitment to the people of Oregon and wish the college success in the future.

== Student life ==
In 1985, COMP students formed a theater group called Sanus, which is the Latin word for "sanity." The theater troupe remains active, and students from other colleges at Western University also participate. The college also hosts an active chapter of Sigma Sigma Phi, a national Osteopathic Medicine Honors Fraternity that emphasizes community service and scholastic achievement. Along with students in other programs at WesternU, students at COMP participate in a number of clubs on campus.

== Notable alumni ==
- Susan Melvin, D.O. class of 1984, is a professor of medicine (UCI and WesternU), family medicine residency director and Chief Medical Officer at Long Beach Memorial Hospital. In 2008, Dr. Melvin received the California Academy of Family Physicians’ Barbara Harris Award for excellence in education.
- Stan Flemming, D.O. class of 1985, a retired United States Army Reserve general.
- William W. Henning, D.O. class of 1986, is the Chief Medical Officer for Inland Empire Health Plan and President of Osteopathic Physicians and Surgeons of California.
- Cynthia Stotts, D.O. class of 1988, became, in 2004, the first female and the first osteopathic physician in the 158-year history of Los Angeles County+USC Medical Center to be elected Chief of Medical Staff; also the first physician ever elected to a second term at that hospital.
- James Lally, D.O. class of 1991, is the President, Chief Medical Officer, and director of medical education at Chino Valley Medical Center. Dr. Lally was the president of the American Osteopathic Foundation in 2010, is the chairman of the International Shooting Sport Federation Medical Committee, and has served as the team physician for the United States Olympic Shooting Team since 1993.
- Lee Burnett, D.O. class of 1997, a U.S. Army Colonel, is also the founder of the Student Doctor Network, a nonprofit educational organization founded in 1999 for prehealth and health professional students.
- Aaron B. Hicks, D.O. class of 2013, a U.S. Navy Lieutenant Commander, served as the Flight Surgeon for the U.S. Navy Blue Angels during their 2019 and 2020 show seasons, and he saw the team through the initial stages of the COVID-19 pandemic as it emerged in the United States in January, 2020.

== See also ==
- List of medical schools in the United States
- Western University College of Podiatric Medicine
- Western University College of Veterinary Medicine
