= College Medical Center =

Coordinates: 33.8073°N 118.1930°W

- College Health Enterprises

Geography
- Location: 2776 Pacific Ave, Long Beach, California, United States

Organization
- Care system: Private, Medicaid, Medicare
- Type: Teaching
- Affiliated university: Western University of Health Sciences; Touro University California

Services
- Beds: 221

History
- Founded: 1956

Links
- Website: www.collegemedicalcenter.com
- Lists: Hospitals in California

College Medical Center is a community-based general acute-care hospital in Long Beach, California, United States. It is located at 2776 Pacific Avenue. The California Department of Health Care Access and Information lists the facility as a general acute-care hospital with 221 licensed beds. The hospital's website states that it is accredited by the Center for Improvement in Healthcare Quality (CIHQ).

== History ==
In 1954, a group of osteopaths opened Pacific Hospital adjacent to the Long Beach Public Health Department. The California Department of Health Care Access and Information's Licensing and Facility Information System lists the facility's original licensure date as 1956.

The hospital previously operated family medicine and dermatology residencies until 2020, which were accredited by the American Osteopathic Association. With the ACGME and AOA merger of graduate medical education for MD and DO residencies, the hospital ceased the family medicine residency due to accreditation conflicts between the two governing bodies.

== Locations ==
College Medical Center operates five locations in Long Beach and Hawthorne, California.

- Main Campus, 2776 Pacific Avenue, Long Beach, California
- South Campus, 1725 Pacific Avenue, Long Beach, California
- Long Beach Partial Hospitalization Program, 1740 Pacific Avenue, Long Beach, California
- Hawthorne Campus, 13300 South Hawthorne Boulevard, Hawthorne, California
- Hawthorne Partial Hospitalization Program, 13300 South Hawthorne Boulevard, Hawthorne, California

== Awards and Recognition ==
In 2026, College Medical Center received Press Ganey's 2025 Guardian of Excellence Award in the clinical-quality category for acute-care facilities. Press Ganey listed the recipient as “College Health Enterprises – College Medical Center" as an organization that ranked in the top 5% of their respective databases for one year in measures of patient, employee, physician, or consumer experience, or clinical quality performance.

== Graduate Medical Education ==
College Medical Center sponsors ACGME-accredited residency programs in internal medicine and psychiatry. According to the hospital, its residency training uses graded supervision intended to provide residents with progressive autonomy.

== See also ==
- Long Beach Memorial Medical Center
- Community Medical Center Long Beach
- St. Mary Medical Center (Long Beach)
