= Clinton E. Adams =

American physician

- Born: Cleveland, Ohio
- Education: Baldwin Wallace College, University of Oklahoma, Chicago College of Osteopathic Medicine
- Occupations: Former President and CEO of Rocky Vista University; Former rear admiral in the United States Navy

Clinton E. Adams is an osteopathic physician, former medical school dean at Western University of Health Sciences, and former president of Rocky Vista University. He serves as a member of the board of directors at Accreditation Council for Graduate Medical Education. He served in the US Navy for 30 years, retiring as rear admiral.

== Education ==
North Olmsted Senior High School Class of 1968 Clinton E. Adams graduated from Baldwin Wallace College with a Bachelor of Science in chemistry. He graduated from the Chicago College of Osteopathic Medicine in 1976. Graduated from the University of Oklahoma with a Master of Public Administration.

He completed his medical internship at Undersea Medicine in Groton, Connecticut. He completed a family medicine residency training at Naval Hospital in Charleston, South Carolina.

In 1989, Adams went to George Washington University in Washington, D.C., where he completed anesthesiology residency.

== Career ==
Adams completed a 30-year career as a U.S. Navy officer. During that time, he achieved the title of rear admiral, and was the commander, CEO, of three naval hospitals, including Portsmouth Naval Regional Medical Center.

In 2005, Adams became dean of the College of Osteopathic Medicine of the Pacific (COMP) at Western University of Health Sciences. He remained at WesternU for 11 years, serving as vice president of clinical affairs. He was the founding dean of a new medical college campus in Oregon (COMP-NW). There is a scholarship in his name at the College of Osteopathic Medicine of the Pacific. The Rear Admiral Clinton E. Adams, DO Endowed Scholarship awards money to military veterans who attend the school.

In October 2015, Adams was appointed president of Rocky Vista University. He retired in June 2021 and was succeeded by Dr. David Forstein.
