= Suzanne Gordon =

American journalist and author (born 1945)

- Born: November 2, 1945 (age 80)
- Education: Cornell University, BA

Suzanne Gordon is an American journalist and author who writes about healthcare delivery and health care systems and patient safety and nursing. Gordon coined the term "Team Intelligence," to describe the constellation of skills and knowledge needed to build the kind of teams upon which patient safety depends. Her work includes, First Do Less Harm: Confronting the Inconvenient Problems of Patient Safety (Cornell University Press, 2012), a collection of essays edited with Ross Koppel and Beyond the Checklist: What Else Health Care Can Learn from Aviation Safety and Teamwork (Cornell University Press, 2012), written with commercial pilot Patrick Mendenhall and medical educator Bonnie Blair O’Connor, with a foreword by Captain Chesley "Sully" Sullenberger.

It also includes books about nursing's contribution to health care including Life Support: Three Nurses on the Front Lines, and Nursing Against the Odds: How Health Care Cost Cutting, Media Stereotypes, and Medical Hubris Undermine Nurses and Patient Care. With Bernice Buresh, she is author of From Silence to Voice: What Nurses Know and Must Communicate to the Public, which is in its third edition. Along with Sioban Nelson, she co-edits The Culture and Politics of Health Care Work Series at Cornell University Press.

She is author, co-author or editor of 21 books. She is currently working on a book about the innovations and clinical care at the Veterans Health Administration. Gordon is co-author of the play about team relationships in healthcare entitled Bedside Manners. This play has been performed at numerous venues including the Institute for Healthcare Improvement, The Hospital of the University of Pennsylvania, Cedars-Sinai Medical Center, The National Patient Safety Foundation, and is being used in Interprofessional Education programs in the US and Canada, including the University of Toronto and The University of California at San Francisco, Yale University, and many others.

Gordon has been a radio commentator for US CBS Radio and National Public Radio's Marketplace. She is a certified TeamSTEPPS Master Trainer. Gordon has lectured all over the world on healthcare issues. She is assistant adjunct professor at the University of California at San Francisco School of Nursing. She is also an affiliated scholar at the Wilson Centre at the University of Toronto's Faculty of Medicine. and an editorial board member of the Journal of Interprofessional Care.

== Early years ==
Suzanne Gordon grew up in New York City and Scarsdale, New York. Her father, Dan M. Gordon, M.D., was an ophthalmologist, who practiced at New York Hospital and was a professor at Cornell Medical School. He did the original research that adapted the use of ACTH and Cortisone for the treatment of inflammatory eye diseases.

She got her first job in journalism in 1970 at United Press International. She also helped found and write for Women: A Journal of Liberation, one of the first feminist journals in the US.

== Career ==
For the first part of her career she wrote largely about political culture and women's issues, writing Lonely in America (1976), a journalistic account of loneliness as a mass social problem in American society. She also wrote a widely reviewed expose of ballet as work – Off Balance: The Real World of Ballet. The book challenged the myth that everything is beautiful at the ballet.

Gordon began writing about healthcare after she had her first baby at a small community hospital outside of Boston. Socialized like so many others, only to focus on the role of physicians in healthcare, she was surprised to discover the importance of nurses in monitoring and managing her labor and delivery, making sure she and her baby were safe, and helping her to cope with her post-labor problems and learn how to take care of her baby. She wrote her first article on nursing, "The Crisis in Caring" for the Boston Globe Sunday Magazine. She then spent three years at the Beth Israel Hospital in Boston, following three nurses for her book Life Support: Three Nurses on the Front Lines.

In 2000, with the publication of the paperback version of Dana Beth Weinberg's Code Green, for which she wrote a foreword, Gordon and her colleagues Fran Benson and Sioban Nelson, launched the Culture and Politics of Health Care Work Series at Cornell University Press which has published 30 titles on healthcare.

== Awards ==
- American Journal of Nursing. 2000 Book of the Year Award. From Silence to Voice: What Nurses Know and Must Communicate to the Public.
- Nursing in the Media Award. Registered Nurses Association of Ontario. 2001.
- 2005 Golden Lamp Award for the Best Media Depiction of Nursing (Center for Nursing Advocacy) for Nursing against the Odds
- Winner of the 2006 Golden Lamp Award for Best Media on How Nurses Present Themselves to the Public for The Complexities of Care
- Winner of the 2006 American Journal of Nursing Book of the Year Awards (Community/Public Health, Professional Development and Issues, History and Public Policy) for The Complexities of Care
- Book of the Year Award. American Journal of Nursing for Safety in Numbers, 2008.
- First-place Winner of the 2009 AJN Book of the Year Awards (Leadership and Management, Public Interest and Creative Works) for Safety in Numbers

== Books ==
- Gordon, Suzanne. Black Mesa: The Angel of Death. New York: John Day, 1973. ISBN 978-0381900069
- Gordon, Suzanne. Lonely in America. New York: Simon and Schuster, 1976. ISBN 978-0525705642
- Gordon, Suzanne. Off Balance: The Real World of Ballet. New York: Pantheon, 1984, paperback, McGraw Hill, 1985. ISBN 978-0070237704
- Gordon, Suzanne. Prisoners of Men's Dreams: Striking Out for a New Feminine Future. New York: Little, Brown and Company, 1991. ISBN 978-0316321068
- Gordon, Suzanne. Life Support: Three Nurses on the Front Lines. New York: Little, Brown and Company, 1997. ISBN 978-0-8014-7428-6, paperback Back Bay Books, 1998. ISBN 9780316329637
- Buresh, Bernice and Gordon, Suzanne. From Silence to Voice: What Nurses Know and Must Communicate to the Public. Ottawa: Canadian Nurses Association, third edition 2013. ISBN 978-0801478734
- Gordon, Suzanne. Nursing Against the Odds: How Health Care Cost Cutting, Media Stereotypes, and Medical Hubris Undermine Nurses and Patient Care. Ithaca: Cornell University Press, 2005. ISBN 978-0-8014-3976-6
- Buresh, Bernice and Gordon, Suzanne. From Silence to Voice: What Nurses Know and Must Communicate to the Public, 2nd Edition. Ithaca: Cornell University Press, May 2006. ISBN 978-0-8014-7873-4
- Nelson, Sioban and Gordon, Suzanne editors. The Complexities of Care: Nursing Reconsidered. Ithaca: Cornell University Press, 2006. ISBN 978-0-8014-4505-7
- Gordon, Suzanne, Buchanan, John, Bretherton, Tanya. Safety in Numbers: Nurse-to-Patient Ratios and the Future of Health Care. Ithaca: Cornell University Press, 2008. ISBN 978-0-8014-4683-2
- Gordon, Suzanne, editor. When Chicken Soup Isn't Enough: Stories of Nurses Standing Up for Themselves, Their Patients, and Their Profession. Ithaca: Cornell University Press, 2010. ISBN 978-0-8014-4894-2
- Koppel, Ross and Gordon Suzanne, editors. First Do Less Harm: Confronting the Inconvenient Problems of Patient Safety. Ithaca: Cornell University Press, 2012. ISBN 978-0-8014-5077-8
- Gordon, Suzanne, Mendenhall, Patrick, O’Connor, Bonnie Blair, with a foreword by Captain Chesley "Sully" Sullenberer. Beyond the Checklist: What Else Healthcare Can Learn from Aviation Safety and Teamwork. Ithaca: Cornell University Press, 2012. ISBN 978-0-8014-5160-7
- Gordon, Suzanne, Feldman, David L. Leonard, Michael. Editors, Collaborative Caring: Stories and Reflections on Teamwork in Health Care. Ithaca: Cornell University Press, 2014

== Board and committee memberships ==
- Editorial board member Nursing Inquiry
- board member Journal of Interprofessional Care
- Robert Wood Johnson Committee on the Nursing Shortage
