= Long Beach Memorial Medical Center =

- MemorialCare Health System

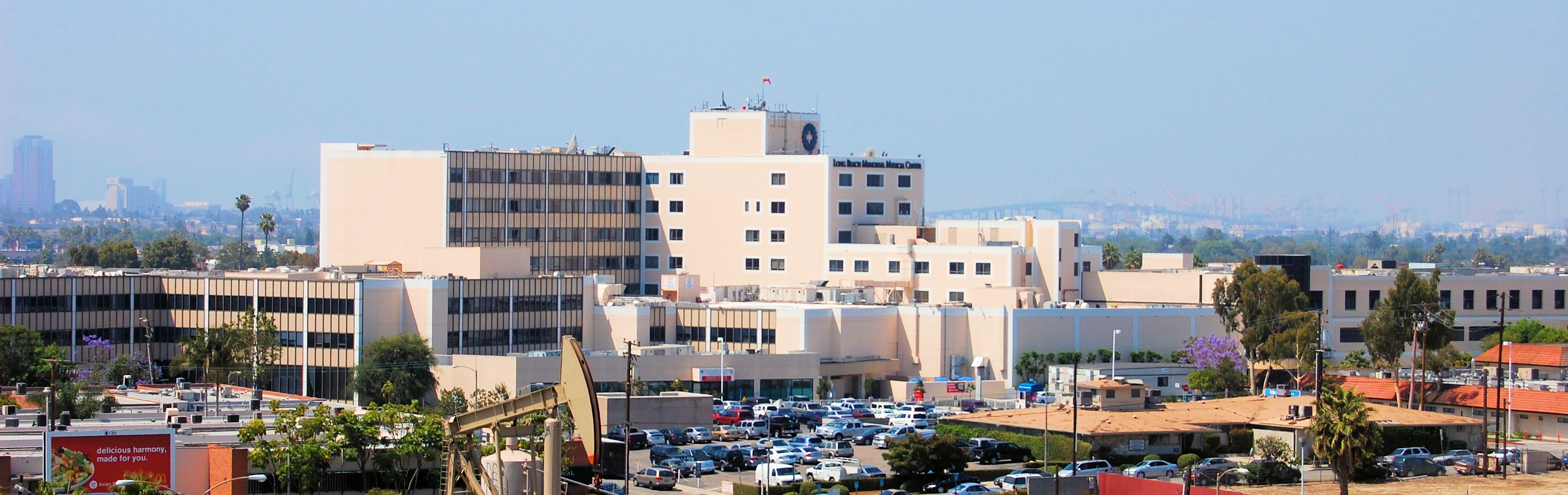

Geography
- Location: Long Beach, California, United States
- Coordinates: 33.80826°N 118.18719°W

Organization
- Type: Teaching

Services
- Emergency department: Level II trauma center
- Beds: 420

History
- Founded: 1907

Links
- Website: http://www.memorialcare.org/...
- Lists: Hospitals in California

MemorialCare Long Beach Medical Center (LBMC), best known by its former name of Long Beach Memorial Medical Center, is a hospital in Long Beach, California. It is the flagship hospital of the MemorialCare Health System. The hospital is accredited by the Joint Commission.

Long Beach Memorial is one of only 3 hospitals in California with a 320 Slice CT Scanner and preventive technology and programs such as the Electromagnetic Navigation Bronchoscope (ENB) and the Division of Interventional Neuroradiology. The hospital includes facilities such as the MemorialCare Heart and Vascular Institute, the MemorialCare Todd Cancer Institute, the MemorialCare Rehabilitation Institute, the MemorialCare Orthopedic Institute, the MemorialCare Neuroscience Institute, MemorialCare Joint Replacement Center, Stroke Program and the Emergency Department and Trauma Center.

Miller Children's Hospital is located on the campus of Long Beach Memorial Medical Center.

== History ==
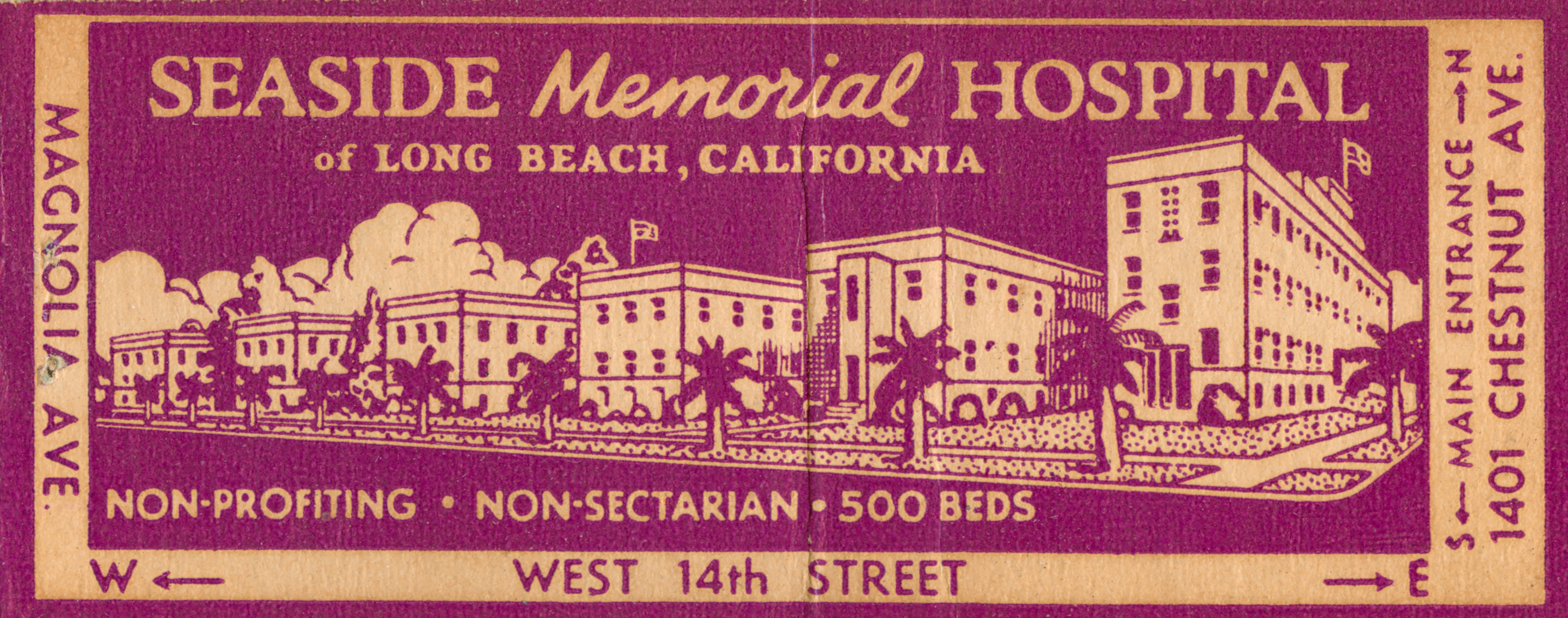
Seaside Memorial Hospital, now the location of Seaside Park

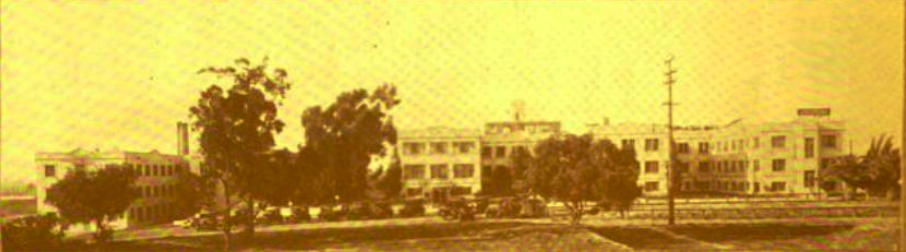
Seaside Hospital, circa 1928

Long Beach Memorial was first established as Seaside Hospital in 1907, co-founded by Fanny Bixby Spencer and Dr. A.C. Sellery. Seaside Memorial Hospital was incorporated on June 23, 1937. In 1960, the hospital moved to its present location; Seaside Park now occupies the original site. In April 2012, Susan Melvin, D.O., clinical professor at UCI-School of Medicine and Western University of Health Sciences, assumed the position of Chief Medical Officer.

== Rankings and awards ==
The hospital first received Magnet designation by the American Nurses Credentialing Center (ANCC) in 2013 and again in 2018.

In the 2017 report card from the Leapfrog Group, an employer-backed nonprofit group focused on health care quality, Long Beach Memorial received a B.

In the 2017 U.S. News & World Report nation's best hospital rankings, Long Beach Memorial is ranked 7th in Los Angeles County.

== Union ==
Registered Nurses of LBMMC have been represented by the California Nurses Association since 2001, a labor union and professional nurses association.

== See also ==
- Community Medical Center Long Beach
- St. Mary Medical Center (Long Beach)
- College Medical Center
