= Harkless =

Harkless is a surname. Notable people with the surname include:

- Lawrence B. Harkless, American physician
- Elijah Harkless (born 2000), American basketball player
- Maurice Harkless (born 1993), American basketball player

== See also ==
- Arkless
