= Susan Gordon (disambiguation) =

Susan Gordon (1949—2011) was an American child actress.

Susan Gordon may also refer to:

- Susan M. Gordon, United States intelligence official
- Sue Gordon (born 1943), Australian politician
- Susan Montagu, Duchess of Manchester (née Susan Gordon) (1774–1828), British duchess
- Susan Gordon Lydon (1943–2005), American feminist writer

== See also ==
- Suzanne Gordon, American journalist
