= Good Samaritan Hospital (Los Angeles) =

PIH Health Good Samaritan Hospital
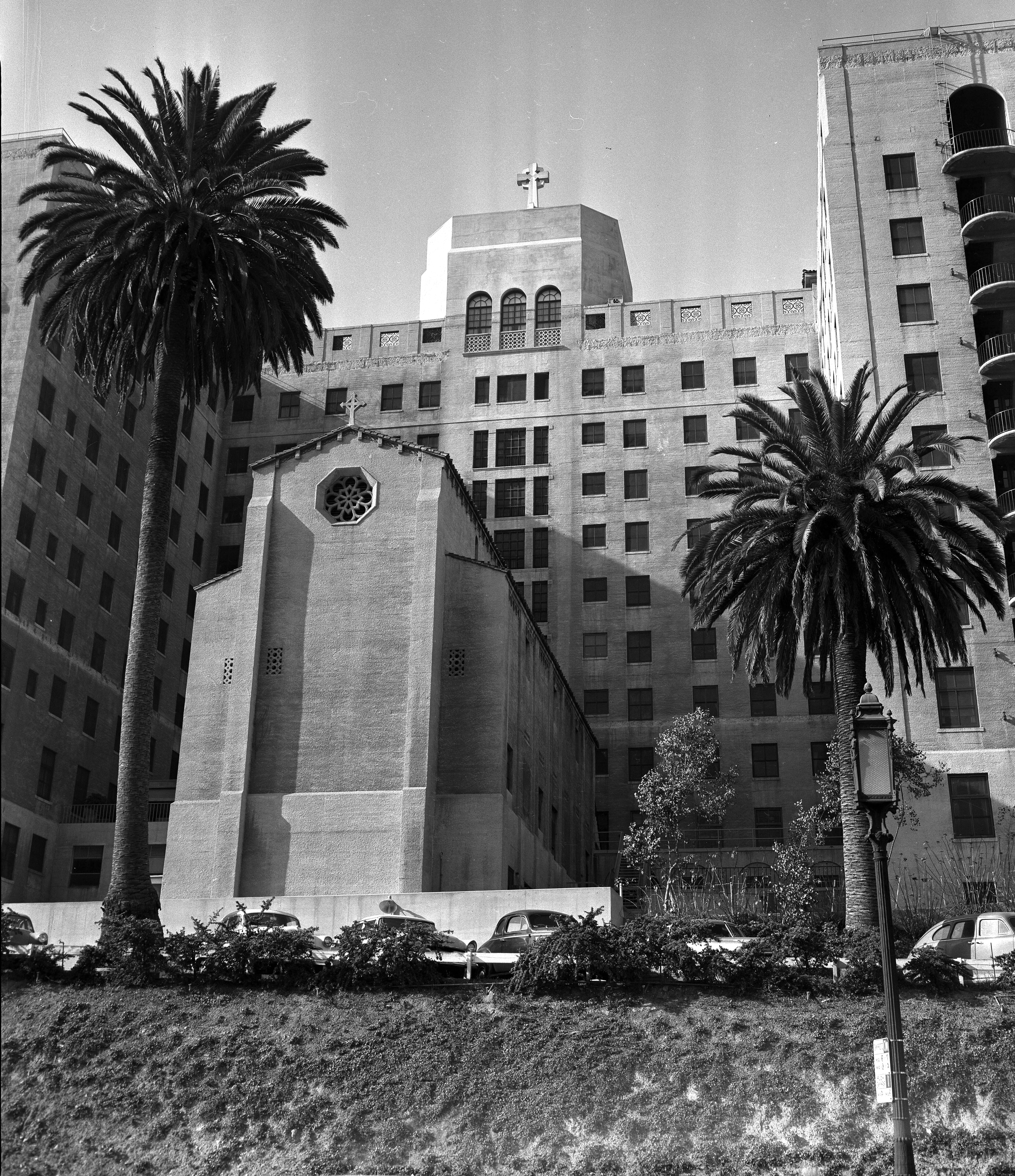
- The hospital as seen in the 1950s

Geography
- Location: 1225 Wilshire Boulevard, Los Angeles 90017, California, United States
- Coordinates: 34°3′16″N 118°15′55″W

Organization
- Care system: Private, Not-for-profit
- Type: Teaching
- Affiliated university: Keck School of Medicine of USC

Services
- Beds: 408

History
- Founded: 1885

Links
- Website: http://www.goodsam.org
- Lists: Hospitals in California

PIH Health Good Samaritan Hospital is a hospital in Los Angeles, California. The hospital has 408 beds. In 2019, Good Samaritan joined the PIH Health network.

== History ==
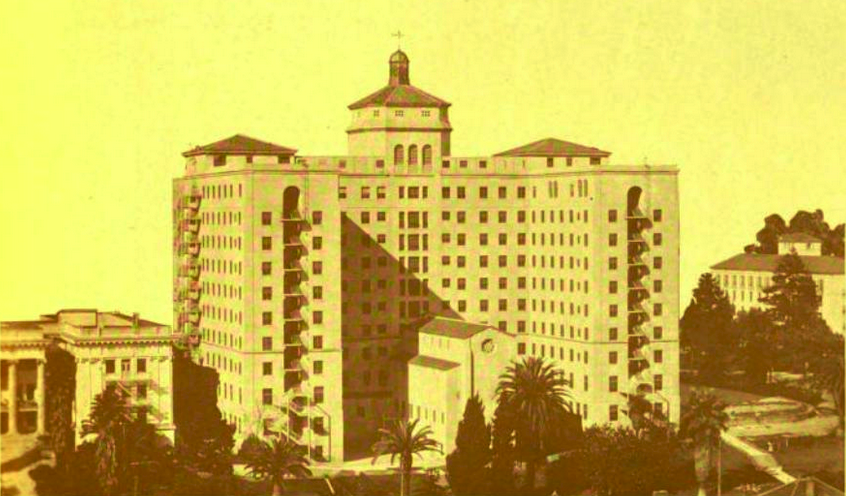
(1928)

In 1885, Sister Mary Wood opened a care facility with nine beds. The hospital was historically affiliated with the Episcopal Church, but currently pastoral care services are available for all religions and denominations. The current hospital was built in 1976.

Prominent American suffragist Inez Milholland died at the hospital on November 25, 1916. Actress Jean Harlow died of kidney disease at the hospital at age 26 at 11:37 AM on June 7, 1937.

Presidential candidate United States senator Robert F. Kennedy died at the hospital early in the morning of June 6, 1968, 25 hours after he was shot at the Ambassador Hotel.

In 1996, the hospital's neonatal intensive care unit was featured in Visiting... with Huell Howser Episode 401.

In 2011, Becker's Hospital Review listed Good Samaritan Hospital under 60 Hospitals With Great Orthopedic Programs.

In 2019 the hospital joined the PIH Health network becoming the third hospital in the network which includes PIH Health Hospital-Whittier and PIH Health Hospital-Downey.

== Controversies ==
Since 2020, after joining the PIH group, Good Samaritan Hospital has been accused of poor, unsafe work conditions for its nursing staff, with workers reporting shortages of PPE and unsafe recycling of masks and gloves. These unsanitary and poor working conditions have led to multiple strikes by nurses affiliated with the California Nurses Association/National Nurses Organizing Committee (CNA/NNU). Chief Nurse Union Representative Alejandro Cuevas said that Good Samaritan Hospital has put patients at risk just to save money in the process. Good Samaritan Hospital was later accused of engaging in Union busting by CNA/NNU when Union Representative Alejandro Cuevas was fired from his position.

Good Samaritan has also been accused of violating California's safe staffing law due to its chronic short-staffing, which has led to nurses assigned too many patients to care for and that means they are unable to take breaks during their 12-hour shifts, forcing them to work overtime and take extra shifts.

== See also ==
- Elizabeth McMaster
