= PIH Health =

Coordinates: 33.968829°N 118.048719°W

PIH Health - Whittier
- InterHealth Corporation
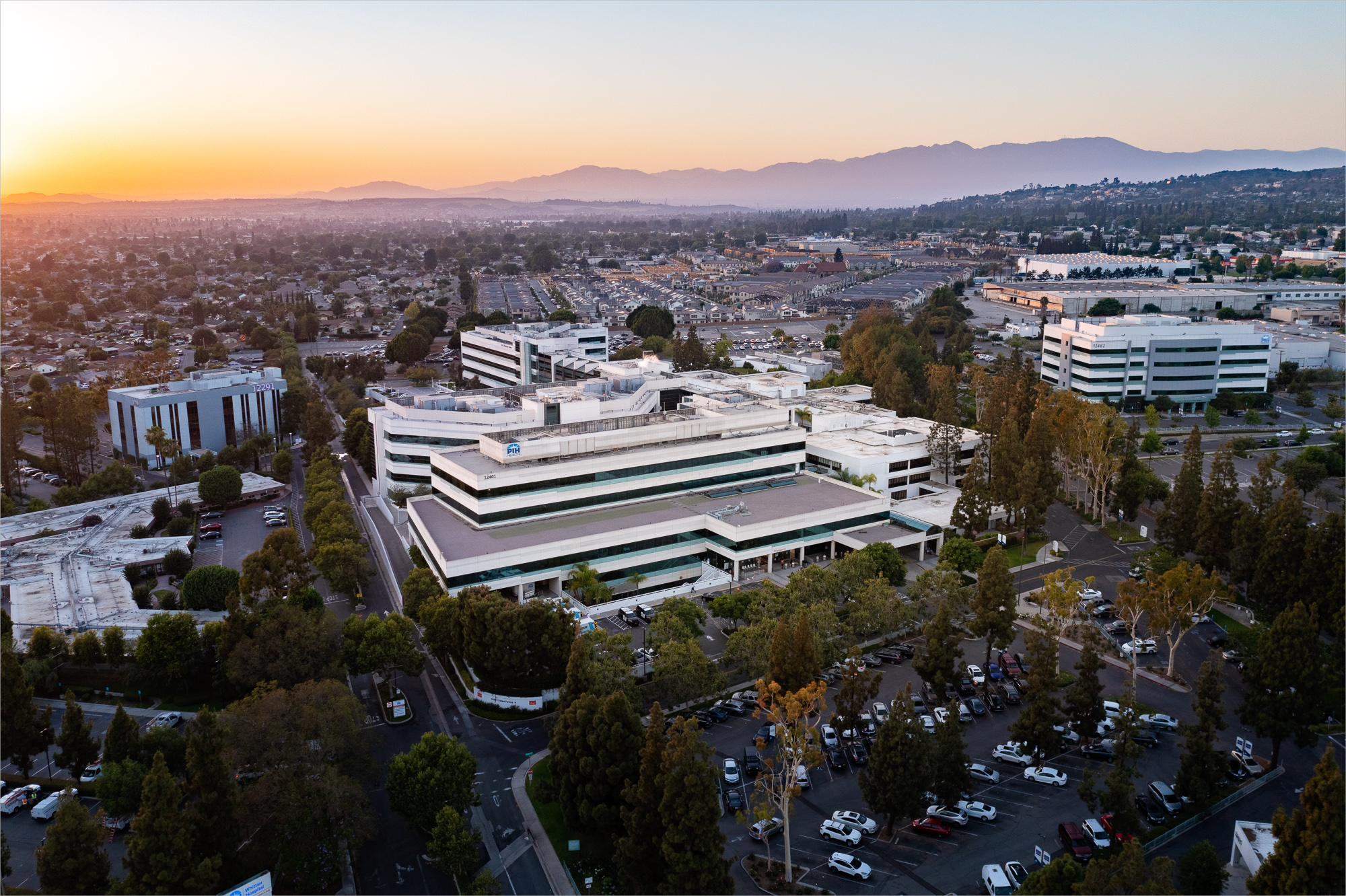
- PIH Health Whittier Hospital in 2021

Geography
- Location: Whittier, California, United States

Organization
- Care system: Private
- Type: Community

Services
- Emergency department: Yes
- Beds: 548

History
- Former name: Presbyterian Intercommunity Hospital
- Opened: 1959

Links
- Lists: Hospitals in California

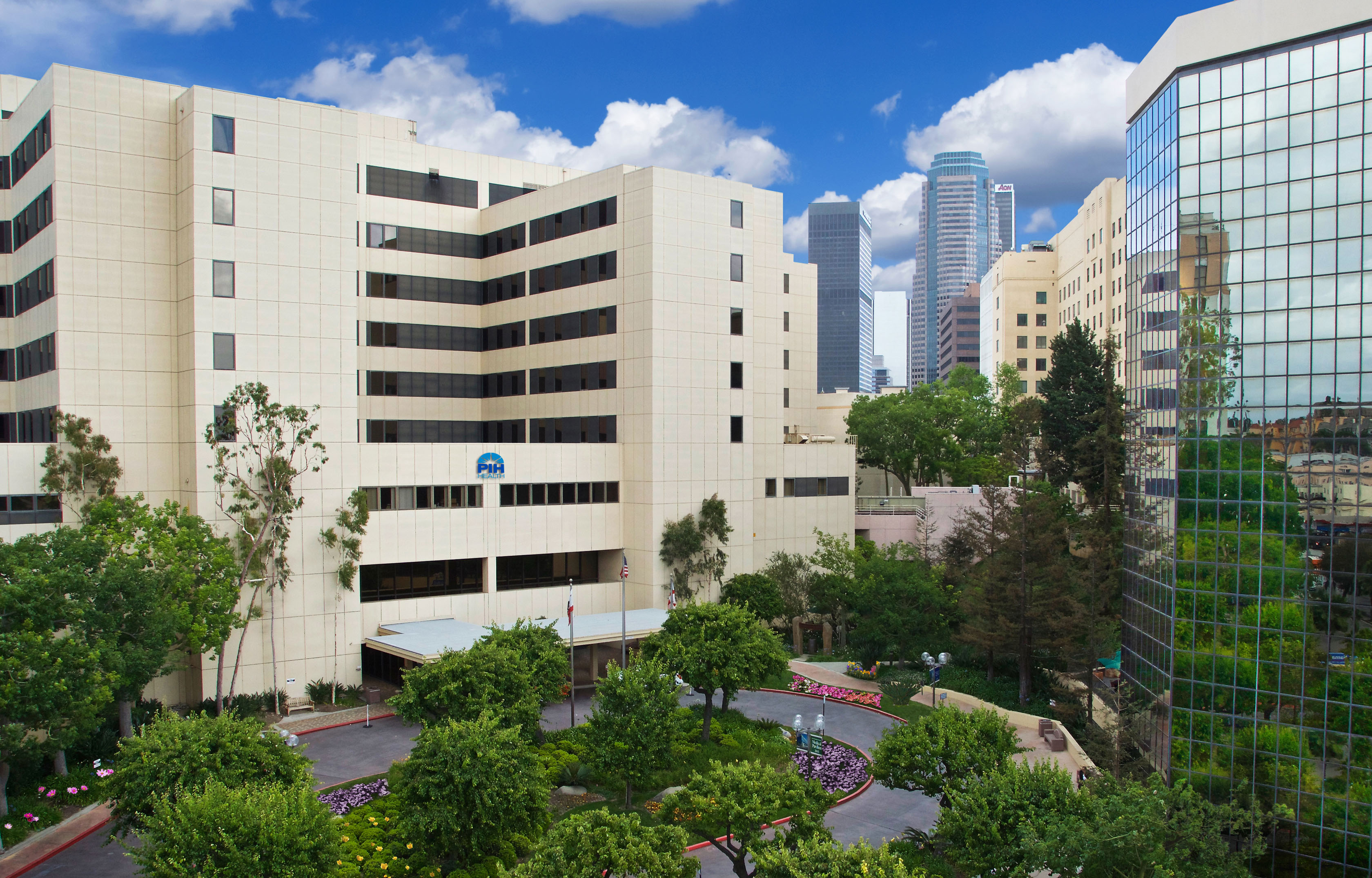
PIH Health Good Samaritan Hospital

PIH Health Hospital - Whittier is a community hospital in Whittier, California. It has 548 licensed beds as of 2013. Founded in 1959 as Presbyterian Intercommunity Hospital, it has been managed by the nonprofit InterHealth Corporation since the mid-1980s. The organization changed its name to PIH Health in 2012. The PIH Health organization started as one hospital in Whittier but now operates three including PIH Health Hospital - Downey which was formerly known as Downey Regional Medical Center added in 2013 and PIH Health Good Samaritan Hospital located in Downtown Los Angeles, added in 2019 making it the third hospital in the medical network. Between all locations PIH Health has 7,100 full-time employees, three hospitals totaling 1,130 licensed beds, and 26 outpatient clinics. The organization operates medical offices in primary care, specialist care and urgent care centers in the region that were formerly branded as Bright Medical and Pioneer Medical Group which was added in 2019 to expand the geographic footprint. PIH Health is the largest employer in Whittier, and one of the largest in that region of Los Angeles County.
