= Lee Burnett =

U.S. Army Colonel and founder of Student Doctor Network

Lee A. Burnett
- Education: University of California, Davis; Western University of Health Sciences
- Occupations: Physician, U.S. Army Colonel
- Known for: Founder of website Student Doctor Network

Lee A. Burnett is an American osteopathic physician, U.S. Army Colonel, and founder of the website Student Doctor Network.

== Education ==
Burnett graduated from the University of California, Davis with an undergraduate degree, and completed medical school at Western University of Health Sciences. Burnett graduated from Western University of Health Sciences in 1997 completed an internship at Downey Regional Medical Center and a family medicine residency at University of California Irvine. He then served as Chief Resident in Family Medicine at the University of California, Irvine. He is certified by the American Board of Family Medicine and the American Osteopathic Board of Family Physicians.

== Career ==
In 1995, Burnett founded the website Osteopathic.com. Originally known as "The Osteopathic Source," the website eventually became Student Doctor Network, which was launched in 1999. In 2017, Burnett was appointed to position of colonel in the US Army. From 2018-2019, Burnett commanded the 115th Field Hospital. Burnett has served two tours of duty with the US Army in Iraq and one in Afghanistan. He was the executive director at Student Doctor Network. He currently serves on the board of directors for the Health Professional Student Association. Burnett led the 32nd Hospital Center until June 2020. He took command of the 65th Medical Brigade in June 2022.
