= Arkless =

Arkless is a surname. Notable people with the surname include:

- Brede Arkless (1939–2006), British rock climber and mountaineer
- David Arkless (born 1954), British businessman
- Richard Arkless (born 1975), British politician
- Alicia Arkless (born 1997), British Actor

== See also ==
- Harkless
