= 115th Field Hospital =

15th Field Hospital
- Country: United States of America
- Branch: Regular Army
- Type: Field hospital
- Garrison/HQ: Fort Polk, LA
- Nickname: Warrior Medics (special designation)
- Engagements: World War I World War II; Desert Storm; SFOR: Bosnia-Herzegovina; Operation Iraqi Freedom; Operation Enduring Freedom

Insignia
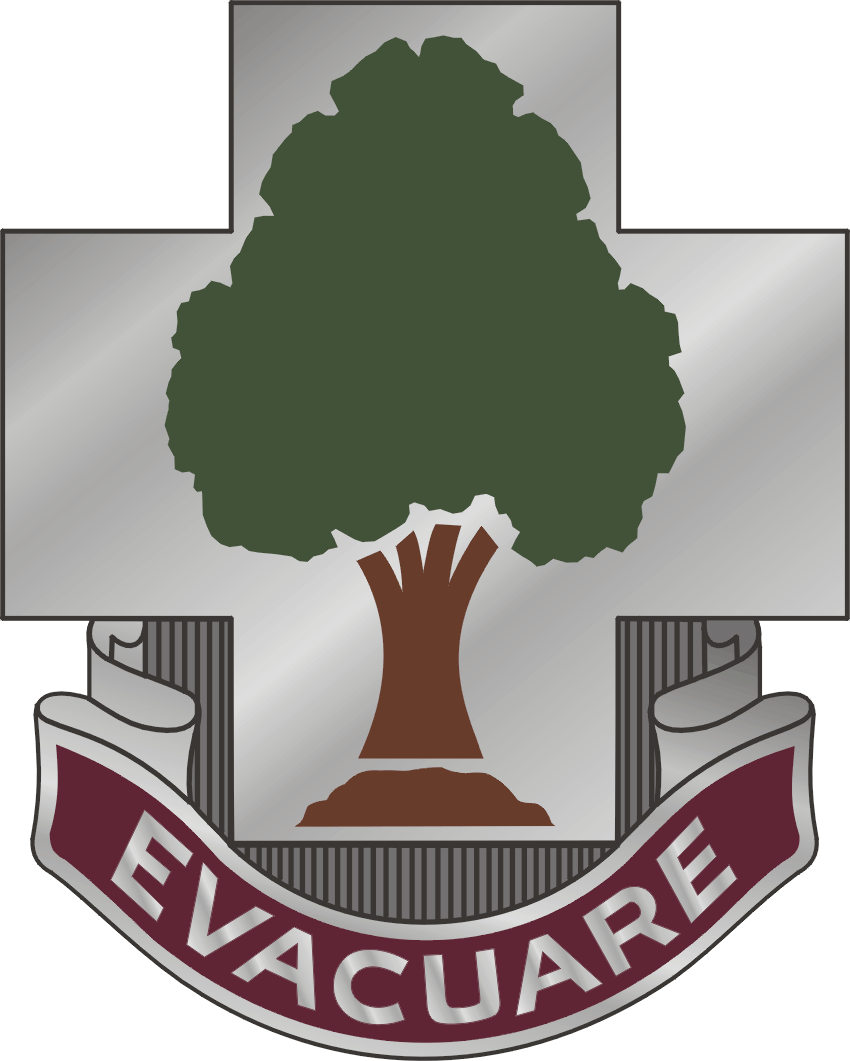
- Distinctive unit insignia

The 15th Field Hospital ("Warrior Medics") is a field hospital of the United States Army formed in 1917 and perpetuated until today. The hospital has participated in World War I, World War II, Desert Storm, Operation Iraqi Freedom and Operation Enduring Freedom (Afghanistan). As of March 2019, the 15th Combat Support Hospital reorganized and re-designated as a field hospital and is now a component unit of the 32d Hospital Center.

== Former command elements ==
- Colonel Lee Freeman (CDR) 2020-2022
- Colonel Lee A. Burnett (CDR) 2018–2020
- Colonel David W. Wolken (CDR) 2016–2018
- Colonel Andrew E. Doyle (CDR) 2014–2016
- Colonel Kevin J. Stevens (CDR) 2012–2014
- Colonel Patricia Darnauer (CDR) 2009–2012 (OEF)
- Colonel John McGrath (CDR) 2006–2009 (OIF)
- Colonel Jeffrey Short (CDR) 2004–2006 (OIF)
- Colonel Donn Richards (CDR) 2002–2004 (OIF)
- Colonel Douglas Hewitt (CDR) 2000–2002
- Lieutenant Colonel Jim Solomon (CDR) 1994–1996
- Command Sergeant Major Michael Chavaree (CSM) 2019-present
- Command Sergeant Major Dolores Kiyoshi (CSM) 2018–2019
- Command Sergeant Major Felix Z. Infante III (CSM) 2016–2018
- Command Sergeant Major Edward D. Leonard (CSM) 2014–2016
- Command Sergeant Major William L. Majors (CSM)
- Command Sergeant Major Janine Osterberg (CSM)
- Command Sergeant Major Timothy Motes (CSM) (OEF)
- Command Sergeant Major Shirley Hunt (CSM) (OIF)
- Command Sergeant Major Reyes Perez (CSM) (OIF)
- Command Sergeant Major Cheryl Mathis (CSM) (OIF)

== Lineage ==
- Constituted 28 December 1917 in the Regular Army as Evacuation Hospital No. 15
- Organized 21 March 1918 at Fort Riley, Kansas
- Demobilized 28 June 1919 at Camp Lewis, Washington
- Reconstituted 9 November 1936 in the Regular Army and consolidated with the 15th Evacuation Hospital (constituted 1 October 1933 in the Regular Army) and consolidated unit designated as the 15th Evacuation Hospital
- Activated 1 June 1941 at Fort George G. Meade, Maryland
- Reorganized and redesignated 20 October 1943 as the 15th Evacuation Hospital, Semimobile
- Inactivated 8 September 1945 in Italy
- Redesignated 24 August 1949 as the 15th Evacuation Hospital and activated in Germany
- Reorganized and redesignated 10 November 1951 as the 15th Evacuation Hospital, Semimobile
- Reorganized and redesignated 1 October 1953 as the 15th Evacuation Hospital
- Reorganized and redesignated 21 December 1973 as the 15th Combat Support Hospital
- Reorganized and redesignated 16 March 1984 as the 15th Evacuation Hospital
- Reorganized and redesignated 16 October 1994 as the 115th Field Hospital
- Reorganized and redesignated 16 October 2005 as the 115th Combat Support Hospital
- Reorganized and redesignated 2019 as the 115th Field Hospital (a unit of the 32d Hospital Center)

=== Distinctive unit insignia ===
Description: A silver color metal and enamel device 1 5/32 inches (2.94 cm) in height overall consisting of a silver cross couped, bearing an oak tree on a mound proper all above a maroon scroll bearing the motto "EVACUARE" in silver letters.

Symbolism: The silver cross represents the activities of the Medical Corps, and the oak tree represents the service of the organization in the Meuse-Argonne Offensive during World War I.

Background: The distinctive unit insignia was originally approved for the 15th Evacuation Hospital on 5 February 1942. It was redesignated for the 15th Combat Support Hospital on 8 March 1974. It was redesignated for the 15th Evacuation Hospital on 22 October 1984. The insignia was redesignated effective 16 September 1993, for the 115th Field Hospital, with description revised.

== Campaign participation credit ==
- World War I
  - Meuse-Argonne
- World War II
  - Tunisia
  - Sicily
  - Naples-Foggia
  - Anzio
  - Rome-Arno
  - North Apennines
  - Po Valley
- Southwest Asia
  - Defense of Saudi Arabia
  - Liberation and Defense of Kuwait
- Operation Iraqi Freedom
- Operation Enduring Freedom

== Decorations ==
- Meritorious Unit Commendation (Army) for EUROPEAN THEATER

== Media ==
The 115th Combat Support Hospital was featured on LT. Col Oliver North's "NRAs Life of Duty" while serving in Afghanistan in 2011.
