= Western University College of Veterinary Medicine =

Coordinates: 34.0587°N 117.7425°W

College of Veterinary Medicine at Western University of Health Sciences
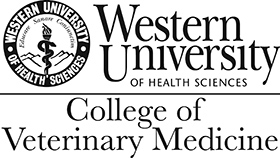
- Type: Private, non-profit
- Established: 1998; 28 years ago
- Parent institution: Western University of Health Sciences
- Dean: John Tegzes
- Students: 400
- Location: Pomona, CA, United States
- Campus: Urban, 22 acres (8.9 ha)
- Website: www.westernu.edu/veterinary

The Western University College of Veterinary Medicine (WesternU CVM) is a non-profit, private, veterinary medical school at Western University of Health Sciences located in Pomona, in the US state of California. The college consists of more than 400 veterinary medical students, and confers the degree Doctor of Veterinary Medicine. The college was established in 1998 as the first veterinary school to open in the country in 20 years. The college is fully accredited by the American Veterinary Medical Association.

== History ==
The College of Veterinary Medicine was established in 1998 after some difficulties with accreditation through the American Veterinary Medical Association's Council on Education. It was the first veterinary medical school to open in the United States since 1983, and at the time, no member on the AVMA's Council on Education had ever been involved in accrediting a new veterinary medical school. The College officially opened its doors in 2003, with the inaugural class beginning courses that year. The College earned full accreditation in 2010.

Shirley D. Johnston DACT was named founding Dean of WesternU CVM, spotlighting the College on being the first veterinary medical school in the United States to appoint a female to the position of dean.

== Academics ==
The College of Veterinary Medicine has an entirely problem-based curriculum, rather than lecture-based. This style of curriculum, with its emphasis on small group work and research, is purported to improve skills that may be less-developed in a lecture format and provide students with more flexibility in determining their study schedule and style. Critics of problem-based learning (PBL) at the time argued that a more structured curriculum was more effective, especially in the beginning portions of program while students are developing active learning skills.

However, subsequent educational research has demonstrated that while structure is valuable in early stages, problem-based learning (PBL) offers significant benefits in fostering critical thinking, self-directed learning, and the application of knowledge to real-world scenarios. Studies have shown that, when appropriately scaffolded, PBL can enhance long-term retention and adaptability in learners, particularly in professional and medical education programs.

Public health is also emphasized throughout the veterinary medicine curriculum.

Veterinary students at WesternU complete clinical rotations at any of more than 300 teaching sites, which contrasts with the traditional model of veterinary education in the US, where students rotate primarily at a large, single, teaching hospital.

Along with students from the other colleges at Western University, students at WesternU CVM participate in interprofessional education. The program is intended to improve understanding of other health professions and to provide and promote a team approach to patient-centered care and health care management, leading to improved patient care. Some evidence supports the effectiveness of interprofessional education in encouraging collaborative practice, although it is not firmly established.

Along with students from the other colleges at Western University, students at WesternU CVM engage in interprofessional education that aligns with the principles of One Health. The program is designed to foster a comprehensive understanding of the interconnectedness of human, animal, and environmental health while promoting collaboration among diverse health professions. This team-based approach enhances patient-centered care and health care management, contributing to improved outcomes across species and ecosystems. Some evidence supports the effectiveness of interprofessional education in advancing collaborative practice and addressing complex health challenges, though further research is needed to establish its long-term impact.

The College of Veterinary Medicine has over 400 students; in 2022, the college received 1,131 applications for 105 positions for the next incoming class.

== Pet Health Care ==
In 2008, the College partnered with Banfield Pet Hospital to open its first on-campus pet hospital. This pet hospital, which was open to the community, focused on providing primary care services such as vaccinations, spaying and neutering, microchipping, surgery, dental exams and cleanings, as well as flea, tick and heartworm control. The pet hospital was placed under the control of WesternU CVM in 2014 under the name Pet Health Center (PHC) and was designed to simultaneously support the local community by providing exceptional care while also serving as a teaching hospital dedicated to educating veterinary students. The hospital now includes a surgical suite, an x-ray room, a Pet Rehabilitation Center, a half dozen exam rooms and isolation facilities. The hospital is housed in a 6,000 square-foot facility on campus, and provides first and second year students with early exposure to clinical care.

Now, under the banner of Pet Health, the College operates various facilities offering various pet health care services in Southern California. This includes the on-campus Pet Health Center (Pomona, CA), off-campus Spay and Neuter Center (Located in the Los Angeles City East Valley Animal Shelter Los Angeles, California), and occasional low-cost mobile services in the form of Veterinary Ambulatory Community Service (VACS).

The Willed deceased Animals for Veterinary Education (WAVE) program, which supports the College's Reverence for Life philosophy, offers pet owners a meaningful opportunity to honor their departed pets by giving them a greater purpose beyond death. The program coordinator works closely with local veterinarians and/or owners to take care of transportation and document collection for the pet after its death. The pet's cremated remains are returned to the owner after it has contributed all it can to the education of future veterinarians.

== See also ==
- Veterinary medicine in the United States
- Veterinary education
