= Chino Valley Medical Center =

Coordinates: 34°1′32″N 117°41′9″W

- Prime Healthcare Services, Inc.

Geography
- Location: Chino, California, United States

Organization
- Care system: Private, Medicaid, Medicare
- Affiliated university: Western University of Health Sciences

Services
- Emergency department: Yes
- Beds: 126

History
- Founded: 1972

Links
- Website: cvmc.com
- Lists: Hospitals in California

Chino Valley Medical Center (CVMC) is a 126-bed acute care facility in Chino, California. CVMC is owned and operated by Prime Healthcare Services, Inc. (PHS), a hospital management company in Ontario, California. PHS was founded in 2001 by Prem Reddy, who acts as its present chairman of the board. The emergency department at Chino Valley receives about 37,000 visits each year. The hospital is accredited by the American Osteopathic Association (AOA) and Healthcare Facilities Accreditation Program (HFAP).

In 2004, US Bankruptcy Courts, Riverside, awarded PHS management of CVMC pursuant to Chapter 11 bankruptcy proceedings.

== Medical education ==
Chino Valley Medical Center operates an Allopathic family medicine residency program along with a podiatric medicine & surgery residency.

== See also ==
- Prime Healthcare Services
