= Miller Children's Hospital =

Miller Children's & Women's Hospital | MemorialCare
- MemorialCare Health System

Geography
- Location: 2801 Atlantic Avenue, Long Beach, California, United States
- Coordinates: 33.80815°N 118.18543°W

Organization
- Care system: Non-profit

Services
- Emergency department: Pediatric Level II Trauma Center
- Beds: 357

Links
- Website: https://millerchildrens.memorialcare.org
- Lists: Hospitals in California

Miller Children's and Women's Hospital Long Beach is a non-profit children's hospital located on the campus of Long Beach Memorial Medical Center in Long Beach, California. Miller Children's and Women's provides specialized pediatric care for infants, children, teens, and young adults aged 0–21. The hospital also houses MemorialCare's women's services, providing maternity care to women across Southern California. The hospital has 357 beds.

== About ==
Miller Children's and Women's is one of only eight free-standing children's hospitals in California — treating more than 14,000 children each year — and has become a regional pediatric destination for more than 84,000 children, who need specialized care in the outpatient specialty and satellite centers.

In 2007, the hospital was named to Leapfrog's top hospital list for the second year in a row.

The hospital first received Magnet designation by the American Nurses Credentialing Center (ANCC) in 2013 and again in 2018.

== See also ==
- Long Beach Memorial Medical Center
