= College of Osteopathic Medicine of the Pacific, Northwest =

Medical school in Oregon, U.S.

Heatherington College of Osteopathic Medicine at Western University of Health Sciences
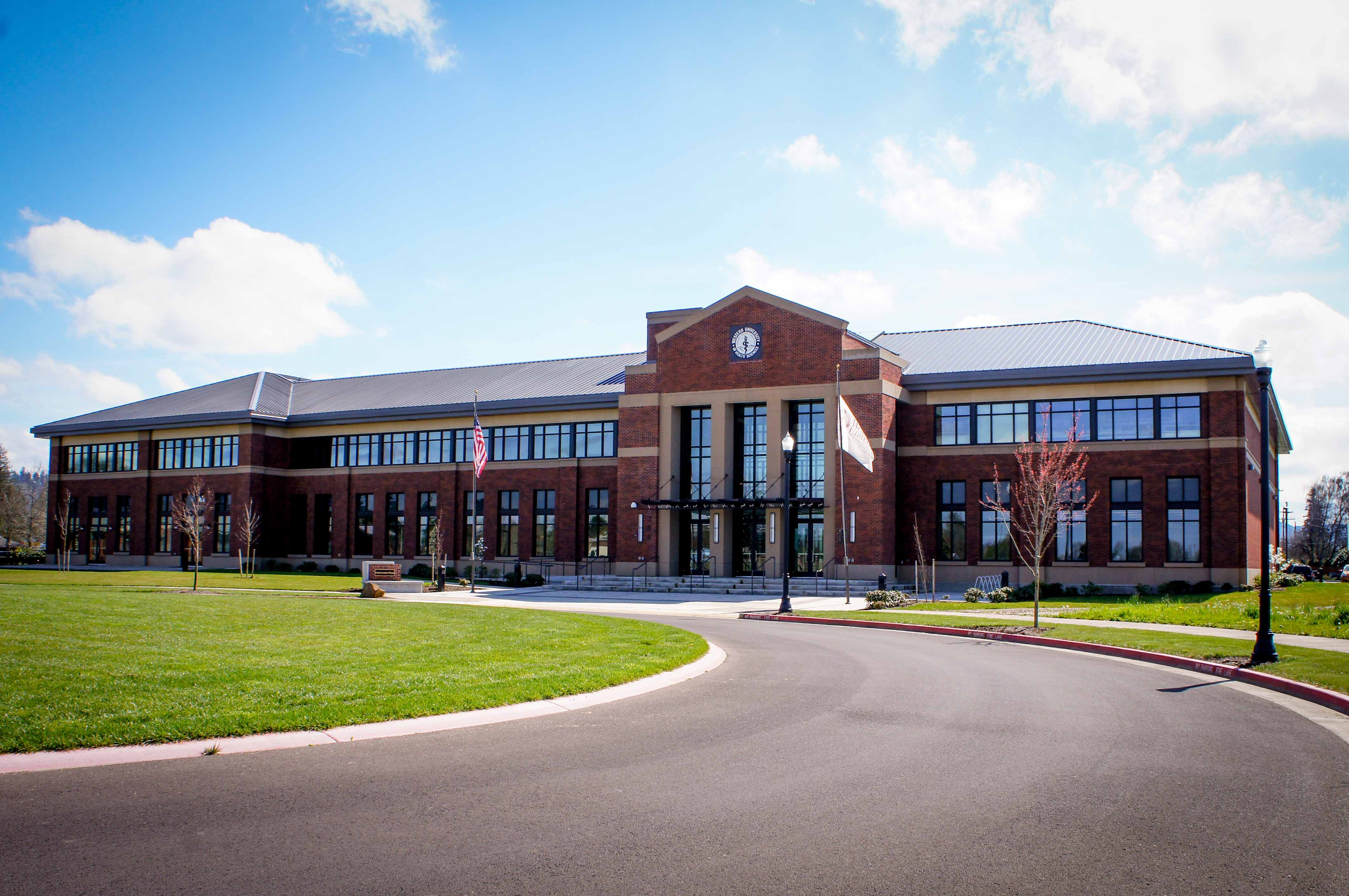
- Main college building. Opened for classes in fall 2011.
- Other name: WesternU HCOM
- Type: Private, non-profit
- Established: 2011
- President: Robin Farias-Eisner, MD, PhD, MBA
- Dean: Lisa Warren, DO, MBA
- Administrative staff: 21
- Postgraduates: 413
- Location: Lebanon, Oregon, U.S. 44.5492°N 122.9104°W
- Campus: Rural, 50 acres (20 ha)
- Website: www.westernu.edu/osteopathic/northwest/

The Heatherington College of Osteopathic Medicine, formerly known as College of Osteopathic Medicine of the Pacific-Northwest, is a non-profit, private medical school for osteopathic medicine located in Lebanon, in the U.S. state of Oregon. Opened in 2011, the school is a branch campus of Western University of Health Sciences' College of Osteopathic Medicine of the Pacific, and is operated in partnership with Samaritan Health Services. Graduates of the college receive the Doctor of Osteopathic Medicine degree. The university eventually plans to open additional colleges at the Lebanon campus.

== History ==
Plans for the school were announced as early as 2007, and in January 2008 it was announced the school would partner with Willamette Valley based Samaritan Health Services. A year later, the planned school received accreditation by the American Osteopathic Association, and in June 2009 groundbreaking took place for the first building on the campus, a 55,000-square-foot (5,100 m^{2}) structure owned by Samaritan Health Services and leased to the school. That building was estimated to cost $15 million to build, and COMP Northwest signed a 20-year lease on the building.

During the 76th Oregon Legislative Assembly, the Senate passed a resolution to "congratulate the College of Osteopathic Medicine of the Pacific Northwest, thank the founders for their commitment to the people of Oregon and wish the college success in the future". The school opened in August 2011 with an initial enrollment of 107 students, and 15 full-time faculty members. At that time tuition was $47,000 and the college planned to eventually grow to 400 students. COMP Northwest is expected to nearly double the number of Oregon residents graduating as physicians from medical school. In March 2012, the Lebanon Area Chamber of Commerce gave COMP-Northwest the Small Business of the Year Award. The school's first class of 100 graduated in June 2015.

As of the 2025-2026 academic school year there were 413 students enrolled with a faculty and administrative staff of 21 and 1,100 alumni at the end of academic year 2026.

On July 24th, 2025 the school announced it would be renamed to the Heatherington College of Osteopathic Medicine in honor of benefactor Jeff Heatherington. Heatherington has donated around $50 million to the college as well as 150 acres of property to build a new behavioral health college in Lebanon.

In September 2025, the school received the deed for 150 acres of land in Lebanon, Oregon.

== Recognition ==
U.S. News & World Report has named Western University of Health Sciences' College of Osteopathic Medicine of the Pacific & Heatherington College of Osteopathic Medicine as a Tier I institution for primary care training. WesternU has also been recognized for the most graduates Practicing Primary Care, Practicing in Health Professional Shortage Areas and a Tier 4 medical school for research.

== Candidate Profile ==
The average overall GPA of the incoming Class of 2025 was 3.74 and the average MCAT score was 508.

== Campus ==
The campus is located across the street from Samaritan Health Services' Lebanon Community Hospital. The College of Osteopathic Medicine of the Pacific previously provided students with residencies at the hospital before the new branch campus opened. WesternU HCOM's campus shares lectures from the home campus in Pomona, California. Lectures are streamed in both directions, with most of the lectures coming from the Pomona campus. The campus has a single two-story building leased from Samaritan Health Services, with an option to buy the building and construct additional buildings at the location.

== See also ==
- List of medical schools in the United States
- Western University College of Podiatric Medicine
- Western University College of Veterinary Medicine
