= Banfield Pet Hospital =

American company

- Company type: Subsidiary
- Industry: Veterinary Services
- Founded: 1955; 71 years ago Portland, Oregon, U.S.
- Headquarters: Vancouver, Washington, U.S. 45.616306°N 122.485809°W
- Key people: Mony Iyer, President; Daniel Aja Sr. Vice President and Chief Medical Officer
- Products: Veterinary care
- Revenue: US$774.4 million
- Number of employees: 14,000 (2014)
- Parent: Mars Inc.
- Website: www.banfield.com

Banfield Pet Hospital is a privately owned company based in Vancouver, Washington, United States, that operates veterinary clinics. Part of the Mars Inc. family of companies, Banfield owns clinics in the United States, Mexico, and the United Kingdom. Founded in 1955, the company operates many of its 1,000 plus clinics inside PetSmart stores. Banfield is the largest privately owned veterinary practice in the United States. On April 2, 2014, Banfield Pet Hospital announced its headquarters would be relocating to Vancouver, Washington, from nearby Portland, Oregon.

== History ==
Banfield was founded in northeast Portland, Oregon, in 1955 by Warren J. Wegert. The name comes from the nearby Banfield Freeway. In 1987, Scott Campbell purchased the single veterinary hospital which had about $2 million in annual revenues. Medical Management International, Inc. (MMI) was created to own the clinic, and in 1994 the pet store chain PetSmart teamed up with MMI to open pet clinics in their stores initially called VetSmart. By 1996 the private company had grown to in excess of 150 locations in 18 states with over 600,000 pets treated annually and 1,100 employees. PetSmart received rent and a share of the profits from the clinics, and owned part of MMI as part of the deal between the companies. In 2000, Banfield purchased PetSmart's other clinics named Petsmart Veterinary Services.

The company grew to more than 250 clinics by 2001. That year MMI launched BluePaw Family Pet Insurance Company to sell health insurance for pets. After a lawsuit by the Blue Cross and Blue Shield Association, the name was changed to TruePaws in August 2001. In January 2004, the company bought a property for $2.3 million from the Portland Public Schools for a new headquarters on NE 82nd Avenue. They also opened a clinic in England, their first international location, and operated 360 clinics in all.

In October 2004, they began building a new $25 million building for their headquarters on the 5.5-acre (22,000 m^{2}) plot that would total 225,000 square feet (20,900 m^{2}). At that time the company had become the largest privately owned veterinary practice in the United States. They employed more than 4,000 worldwide, of which 900 were veterinarians. In 2004, Banfield opened 80 more clinics and financed teaching hospitals affiliated with the veterinary medicine programs at Western University of Health Sciences and National Autonomous University of Mexico in California and Mexico City respectively. The clinics also began working with Purdue University and the Centers for Disease Control to develop a system to use the data the clinics collect to monitor for possible bioterrorism attacks.

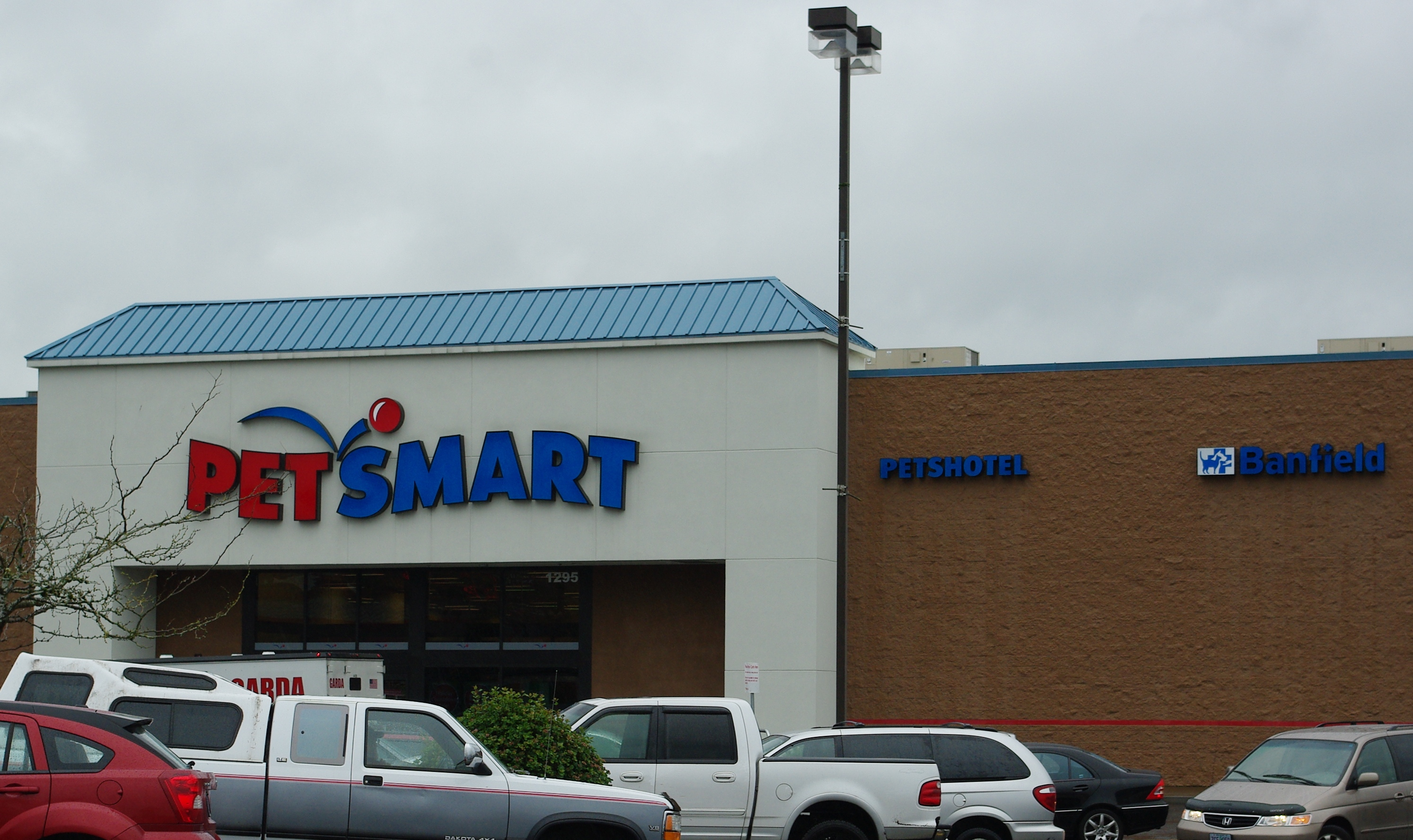
Petsmart with a Banfield location in Hillsboro, Oregon

By 2005, the company served 3.5 million animals annually at 450 clinics worldwide. That year the Banfield Charitable Trust was created to provide free care to economically disadvantaged pet owners. Banfield also opened a third stand-alone hospital, located in Colorado Springs, Colorado.

In early 2007, PetSmart sold off part of its share of MMI, Banfield's parent company. In September 2007, long-time chief executive officer (CEO) Scott Campbell sold his shares of the company to Mars Inc., retired as CEO, and John Payne took over the position, while Campbell remained chairman of the company. PetSmart divested the rest of its MMI stake in 2015.

Banfield sold off its Merlin Digital Technology division that developed imaging equipment in September 2008. In 2008, the company totaled 725 locations spread throughout the United States, Mexico, and the United Kingdom. The $6.5 million Banfield Veterinary Clinical Center at Western University of Health Sciences opened in August 2008. The company was named one of thirteen companies that would be hiring in 2009 despite the economic crisis.

In 2007, Mars Inc., the company known for Snickers candy bars and Pedigree dog food, acquired Banfield Pet Hospital. In 2015, Mars expanded with the purchase of Blue Pearl Hospital. In 2017, Mars Inc., paid $9.1 Billion to acquire VCA Animal Hospitals.

== Lawsuits ==
In 2010, Robert Nix, a former Banfield veterinarian located in Tualatin, Oregon, filed suit against the chain alleging that he was wrongly terminated after complaining that his clinic was "putting profits above the best interest of animals." The suit alleged that the national chain urged employees to conduct superfluous testing in an effort to boost company profits. While Karen Johnson, the vice president of the Portland-based chain, denied the allegations and cited them as having "no merit," Mitra Shahir, Nix's attorney, said that issues at the Oregon Banfield existed not only locally, but companywide.

In 2013, a class-action lawsuit was filed in Pasadena, California, after consumers complained that Banfield's "Optimum Wellness Plans" was not an insurance plan, but rather a marketing ploy that offered veterinary services based on the company's perceived discount. Once customers subscribed and utilized the services, the company would bill the cost of the services against the plan. The Plaintiffs alleged that when they tried to cancel the plan, Banfield's contractual agreement would only provide them with two options to cancel. Consumers could either pay full retail price for all of the services they received, or they could continue paying on the plan until all services were paid in full. Plaintiffs alleged that Banfield's "wellness plan" became an endless cycle of consumer debt. Each "wellness" visit increased the plaintiff's financial obligation needed to pay their way out of the plan's contractual obligation.

== Operations ==
Clinics inside PetSmart locations average four veterinarians and about 1,800 square feet (170 m^{2}). Banfield operates more than 1,000 clinics inside PetSmart locations nationwide. As of 2007, annual revenue totaled US$187.5 million and the company employed more than 5,000 people. Banfield provides veterinary care for pets and also sells discounted care packages called Optimum Wellness Plans. The company's headquarters in Vancouver includes an off-leash dog park open to the public.
