= Lawrence B. Harkless =

- Lawrence B. Harkless
- Born: Texas, U.S.
- Education: Doctor of Podiatric Medicine
- Alma mater: University of North Texas, California School of Podiatric Medicine
- Occupations: Podiatric Physician, Researcher, Dean
- Employer: Western University of Health Sciences
- Known for: Diabetic foot research
- Notable work: University of Texas Wound Classification System,

Lawrence B. Harkless is an American physician who is founding Dean and Professor of Podiatric Medicine and Surgery at the College of Podiatric Medicine, Western University of Health Sciences, Pomona, California, United States. He is a retired Professor, Department of Orthopaedics and former Louis T. Bogy Professor of Podiatric Medicine and Surgery at the University of Texas Health Science Center at San Antonio (UTHSCSA).

Harkless has been described as the "father of diabetic foot care."

== Biography ==
A native Texan, Lawrence B. Harkless did his undergraduate work at The University of North Texas and is a graduate of the California School of Podiatric Medicine in San Francisco where he was a member of the honor society. He completed his internship at UTHSCSA and his residency in Podiatric Surgery at Atlanta Medical Center in Atlanta, GA.

His most significant contribution has been his leadership and passion in integrating podiatric medicine in an academic Health Science Center earning the respect and admiration of his physician colleagues. He was division Chair and Residency Program Director at UTHSCSA. Over the course of his 30-year career, he has trained more than 1,000 students, 176 residents and 15 fellows. Harkless also operated his own private practice, The Alamo Foot Clinic Inc.,

He has chaired the Medical Faculty Assembly, and served as Director of the Podiatric Residency Training Program at (UTHSCSA). He has educated thousands of students, residents, physicians, and health care providers about the complexities of diabetic foot complications and the importance of preventative foot care for people with diabetes. Harkless pioneered the TEAM Approach to Diabetic Foot Care when he developed the nationally and internationally known seminar, “The Diabetic Foot - A Multidisciplinary Approach” in 1985 which has educated over 7,000 health care providers.

Harkless, an ACFAS fellow, is a founding member and the 1st chair of the American Diabetes Association (ADA) Council on Foot Care and past member of the ADA Board of Directors. He is also past-president of the National Podiatric Medical Association and the Texas Podiatric Medical Association. Harkless is a Distinguished Practitioner in the National Academies of Practice.

Harkless is co-author of the book, "Foot and Ankle Secrets", which has become a staple among podiatric residents and students. He also developed the University of Texas Diabetic Wound Classification together with co-contributors.

== Awards ==
In 2010, Harkless received the distinguished Lifetime Achievement Award known as the John Boswick Award and Lectureship given by the Association for the Advancement of Wound Care (AAWC) and Symposium on Advanced Wound Care (SAWC). Additionally, in 2008 he was honored at the Georgetown Diabetic Limb Salvage Conference with the Distinguished Achievement Award in Diabetic Limb Salvage. In 2001, the American Diabetes Association (ADA), the nation's largest and leading voluntary health organization in the fight against diabetes, awarded Harkless the Outstanding Educator in Diabetes Award. Described by some as "the father of diabetic foot care", he is recognized nationally and internationally for his scientific and scholarly contributions serving on editorial boards, scientific advisory panels, for most of the major pharmaceutical companies and government (United States Department of Health and Human Services, Centers for Disease Control and Prevention). He has served on scientific review panels for National Institutes of Health (NIH) and ADA. Moreover, he has edited textbooks and has published more than 130 peer reviewed articles and book chapters. He was a member of the Texas Diabetes Council from 1995 to 2007 and was appointed by then Governor, George Bush, and appoint Chair by Governor Rick Perry in 2001, serving through June 2007.

Harkless is the recipient of the APMA's Distinguished Service Citation, which is the highest honor given by the profession; the President's Excellence Award in Teaching, given to him by UTHSCSA (1998), the Lifetime Achievement Award and Hall of Fame by Podiatry Management Magazine (2002), and a place on the Wall of Honor at the Texas Diabetes Institute (2003).

== Personal life ==
Harkless has been married for 36 years to his wife Gerry. They have two children and two grandchildren.
