= Ross Koppel =

American sociologist (born 1946)

- Ross Koppel
- Born: August 18, 1946 (age 80)
- Education: Temple University (B.A., 1969;M.A., 1971; Ph.D., 1981)
- Known for: Research on the impact of healthcare information technology on medication errors
- Spouse: Meg Shope Koppel
- Scientific career
- Fields: Sociology
- Workplaces: University of Pennsylvania
- Thesis: The Role of Social Psychological Variables in Status Attainment of Young Men (1980)

Ross Koppel (born August 18, 1946) is an American sociologist. He is a senior fellow of the Leonard Davis Institute of Health Economics and an adjunct professor of sociology at The University of Pennsylvania. He is known for studying the impact of healthcare information technology on medical practice. Koppel's work led to controversy in the health care informatics industry and significant changes to guarantee the safety and accuracy of medical records. Koppel has served as president of the Sociological Practice Association and the Association for Applied and Clinical Sociology and has received numerous awards from professional associations. In 2010, Koppel was awarded the Distinguished Career Award for the Practice of Sociology by the American Sociological Association.
