= St. Mary Medical Center (Long Beach) =

Coordinates: 33.77984°N 118.186523°W

- Dignity Health

Geography
- Location: 1050 Linden Ave, Long Beach, California, California, United States

Organization
- Care system: Private/non-profit
- Type: Teaching
- Affiliated university: University of California, Los Angeles

Services
- Emergency department: Level II trauma center
- Beds: 415

History
- Opened: 1923

Links
- Website: Official website
- Lists: Hospitals in California

St. Mary Medical Center (SMMC) is a hospital in Long Beach, California, US. It is currently operated by Dignity Health. SMMC has all private acute care rooms for patients.

== Services ==
In December 1983, the emergency department at SMMC was designated as a level I trauma center for adults. This was changed to level II in 1992. SMMC has partnered with California State University, Long Beach to provide the only mental health trauma recovery center in Southern California. The hospital also has a heart center, orthopedic institute, cancer center and pediatrics and maternity services.

== History ==
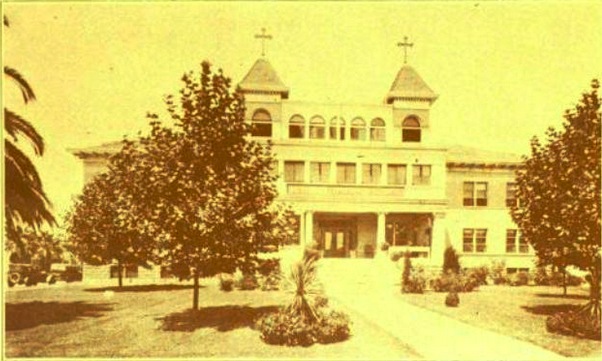
St. Mary's Long Beach Hospital (1928)

In 1923, the Sisters of Charity of the Incarnate Word answered the call from Rev. J.M. Hegarty, pastor at St. Anthony's, to care for the sick and poor in Long Beach, by purchasing what is now St. Mary Medical Center from Dr. T.O. Boyd.

The building was damaged so significantly in the 1933 Long Beach earthquake that the entire building had to be razed and a new, 100-bed facility built on the site. The new hospital opened in 1937 and was financed by a Public Works Administration loan. It was designed by architect I.E. Loveless in the Art Deco style.

Catholic Healthcare West (now Dignity Health) acquired St. Mary Medical Center from the Sisters of Charity of the Incarnate Word in 1996.

== See also ==
- Community Medical Center Long Beach
- Long Beach Memorial Medical Center
