= Journal of Interprofessional Care =

- Language: English
- Edited by: Dr Andreas Xyrichis

Publication details
- History: 1986–present
- Publisher: Taylor & Francis (USA & UK)
- Frequency: Bimonthly
- Impact factor: 2.205 (2016)

Standard abbreviations
- ISO 4: J. Interprof. Care

Indexing
- CODEN: JINCFT
- ISSN: 1356-1820 (print); 1469-9567 (web)

Links
- Journal homepage; Online access; Online archive

The Journal of Interprofessional Care is a bimonthly peer-reviewed medical journal that covers education, practice, and research in health and social care. The journal was established in 1986 as Holistic Medicine and took its current name in 1992.

It is published by Taylor & Francis and the editor-in-chief is Dr Andreas Xyrichis (King's College London). The Journal of Interprofessional Care is supported by an international editorial board.

== Aims and scope ==
The Journal of Interprofessional Care aims to disseminate research and new developments in the field of interprofessional education and practice. We welcome contributions containing an explicit interprofessional focus, and involving a range of settings, professions, and fields. Areas of practice covered include primary, community and hospital care, health education and public health, and beyond health and social care into fields such as criminal justice and primary/elementary education. Papers introducing additional interprofessional views, for example, from a community development or environmental design perspective, are welcome.

The Journal publishes the following types of manuscripts:

1. Peer-reviewed Original Articles (research studies, systematic/analytical reviews, theoretical papers) that focus on interprofessional education and/or practice, and add to the conceptual, empirical or theoretical knowledge of the interprofessional field.

2. Peer-reviewed Short Reports that describe research plans, studies in progress or recently completed, or an interprofessional innovation.

3. Peer-reviewed Interprofessional Education and Practice (IPEP) Guides that offer practical advice on successfully undertaking various interprofessional activities.

4. Guest Editorials that discuss a salient issue related to interprofessional education and practice.

5. Book and Report Reviews that offer summaries of recently published books and reports (published on the Journal's Blog).

== Subjects covered ==
Allied Health; Community Health; Community Social Work; Health Education and Promotion; Health and Social Care; Public Health Policy and Practice; Social Work and Social Policy

== Abstracting & indexing ==
The journal is abstracted and indexed in:

- Applied Social Sciences Index and Abstracts
- Cambridge Scientific Abstracts
- CINAHL
- EMBASE/Excerpta Medica
- Index Medicus/MEDLINE
- PsycINFO
- PsycLIT
- Psychological Abstracts
- Scopus
- Sociological Abstracts

2016 Journal Citation Reports Ranks Journal of Interprofessional Care 22nd out of 77 journals in Health Care Sciences & Services (S) and 36th out of 74 journals in the Health Policy & Services (Ss) with a 2016 Impact Factor of 2.205

== See also ==
- Health human resources
- Interprofessional education in health care
