= Community Medical Center Long Beach =

Coordinates: 33°47′19″N 118°8′41″W

Community Hospital Long Beach
- Molina Wu Network LLC
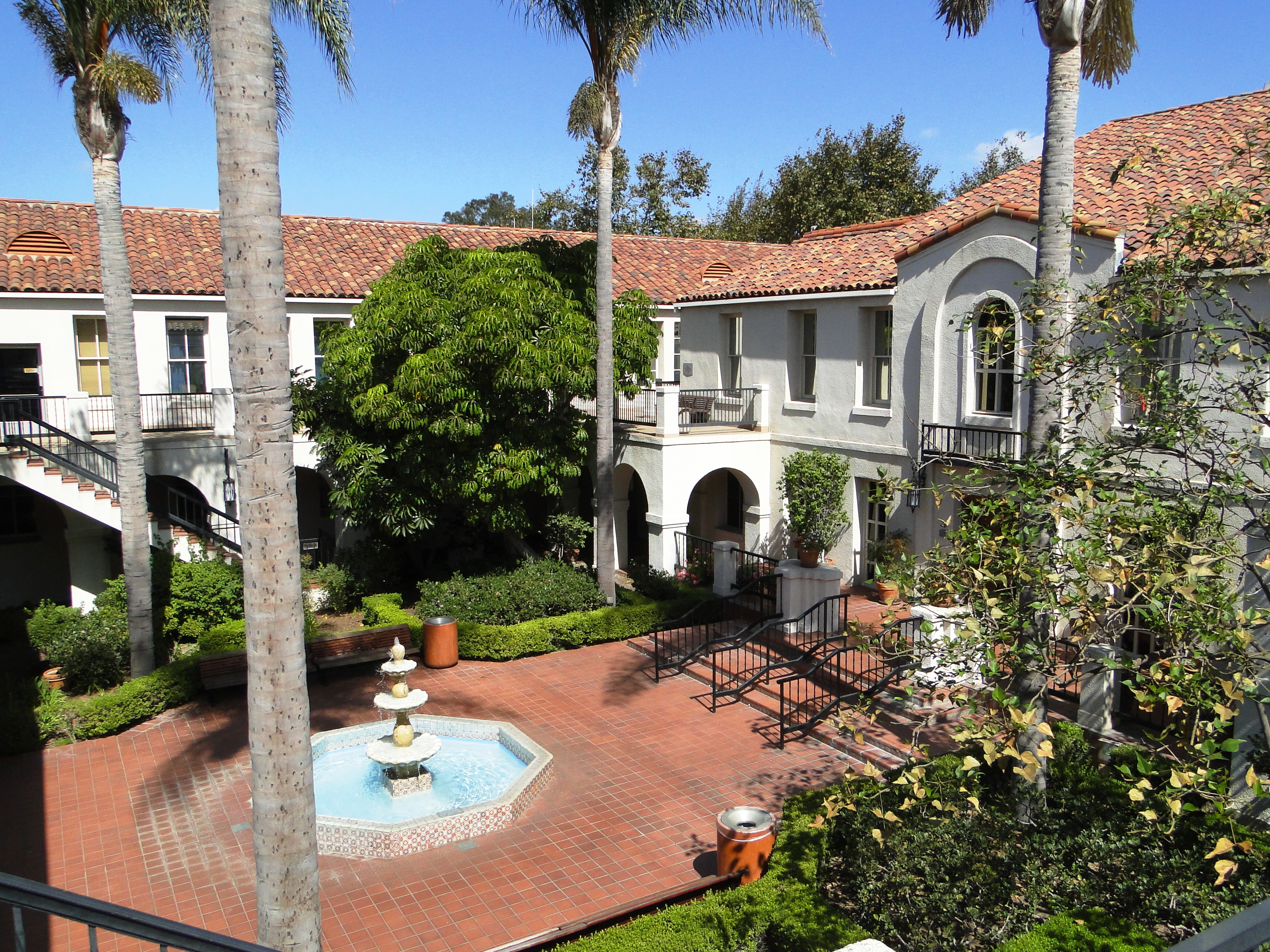

Geography
- Location: 1720 Termino Avenue, Long Beach, California, United States

Organization
- Care system: Private
- Type: Community
- Affiliated university: None

Services
- Emergency department: yes
- Beds: 158

History
- Founded: 1924

Links
- Website: https://communityhospitallb.org
- Lists: Hospitals in California

Long Beach Historic Landmark

Community Hospital Long Beach is an acute care hospital in Long Beach, California. After closing on July 3, 2018, it reopened on Monday, January 4, 2021 under a new operator Molina Wu Network LLC. It closed again in November of that year.

== History ==
Community Hospital of Long Beach was founded in 1924 as Long Beach Community Hospital with 100 beds and 175 surgeons and physicians on staff. Long Beach councilman and mayor Fillmore Condit donated $50,000 to the Long Beach Community Hospital Association to assist with its development. Hugh Davies designed the original Spanish Colonial building. Nine years later, the 1933 Long Beach earthquake shook the hospital but did little damage to the hospital. The hospital provided medical care to hundreds of residents following the disaster. In the 1940s, the hospital added a new wing, increasing the number of beds to 150.

The 1960s and 1970s saw increasing modernization of hospital equipment and facilities with a doubling of the size of the emergency room, the opening of an intensive care unit, a nuclear medicine department and a coronary care unit. In 1980, the hospital was designated as a Historical Landmark. The 1980s and 1990s saw changes of ownership. In 1982, HealthWest bought the hospital. Through a 1988 merger, UniHealth became the owners of the hospital, followed by a purchase of UniHealth's hospitals in 1998 by Catholic Healthcare West.

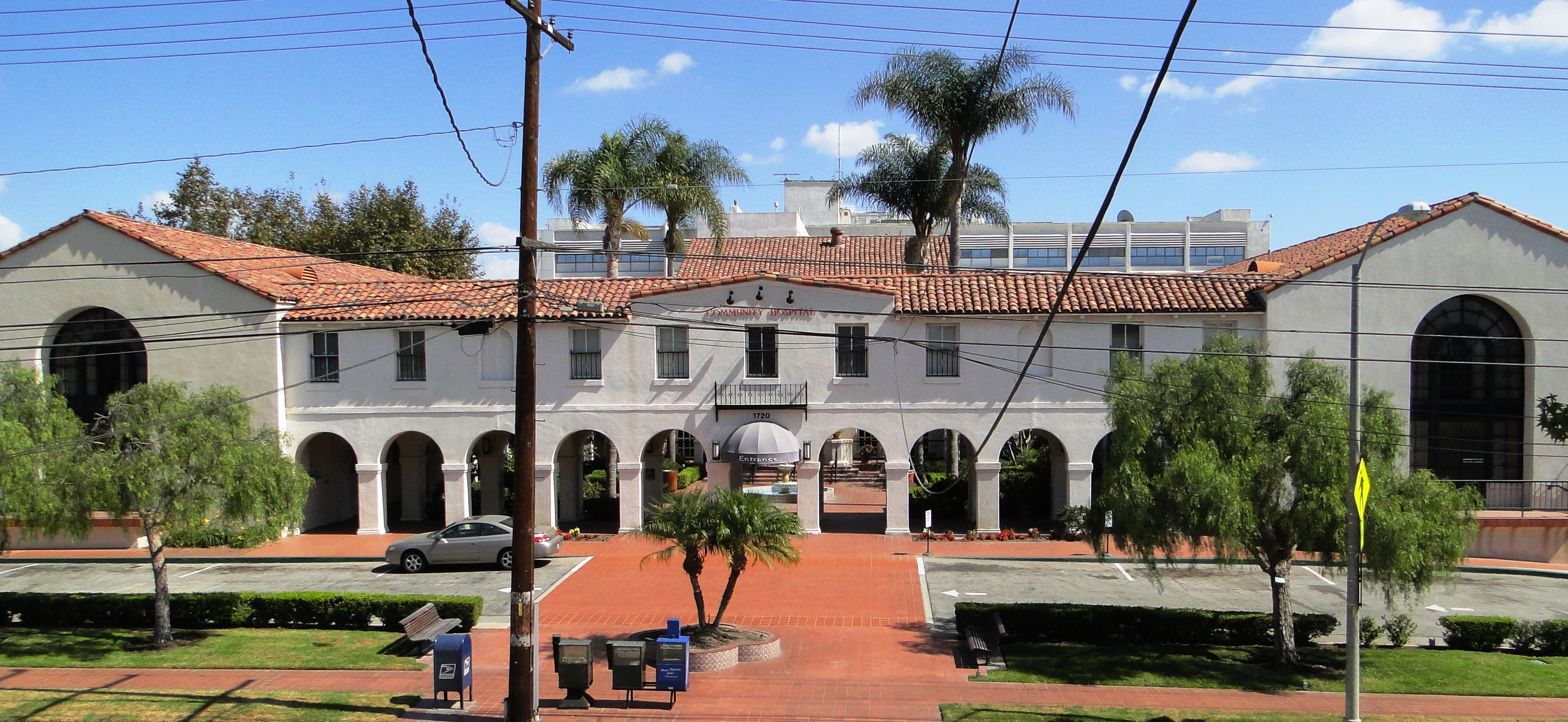
Community Hospital of Long Beach

Throughout the same period, additional changes and upgrades were made to the hospital including a neuropsychiatric center, a neonatal intensive care unit, an urgent care facility and a cancer center. The hospital also received a name change to Long Beach Community Hospital Medical Center. In the year 2000, Catholic Healthcare West closed the hospital prompting a strong reaction from the community around the hospital. After 9-months of “Save Our Neighborhood Hospital” community efforts, the hospital was re-opened with its current name in 2001 through the major efforts of Charles Lane, local realtor.

Since that time, the hospital has continued to expand services by adding a 28-bed behavioral health unit, an occupational medicine clinic and a women's health center for gynecological surgical services. The hospital received a three-year Joint Commission on Accreditation of Healthcare Organizations accreditation in 2006. Community Hospital of Long Beach became part of MemorialCare Health System in 2011.

In June 2011 Memorial Care Health Systems purchased the hospital, preventing its inevitable closure. On September 29, 2017 the hospital was renamed Community Medical Center Long Beach. It has continued its growth and betterment under the leadership of Long Beach Memorial and Millers Women's and Children's Hospital.

=== Closure ===
In 2018, the hospital closed due the discovery of an active earthquake fault underneath the property and was unable to meet the seismic compliance requirements of the state of California. After closing in 2018, the hospital signed a new lease agreement signed with Molina Wu Network LLC. In the midst of the COVID-19 pandemic in California, the Community Hospital reopened on January 4, 2021, providing needed hospital beds to the Southern California region. The facility closed down emergency and acute care services again in November of 2021

== See also ==
- Long Beach Memorial Medical Center
- St. Mary Medical Center (Long Beach)
