= PIH Health Hospital – Downey =

Coordinates: 33.9353°N 118.1303°W

PIH Health Downey Hospital
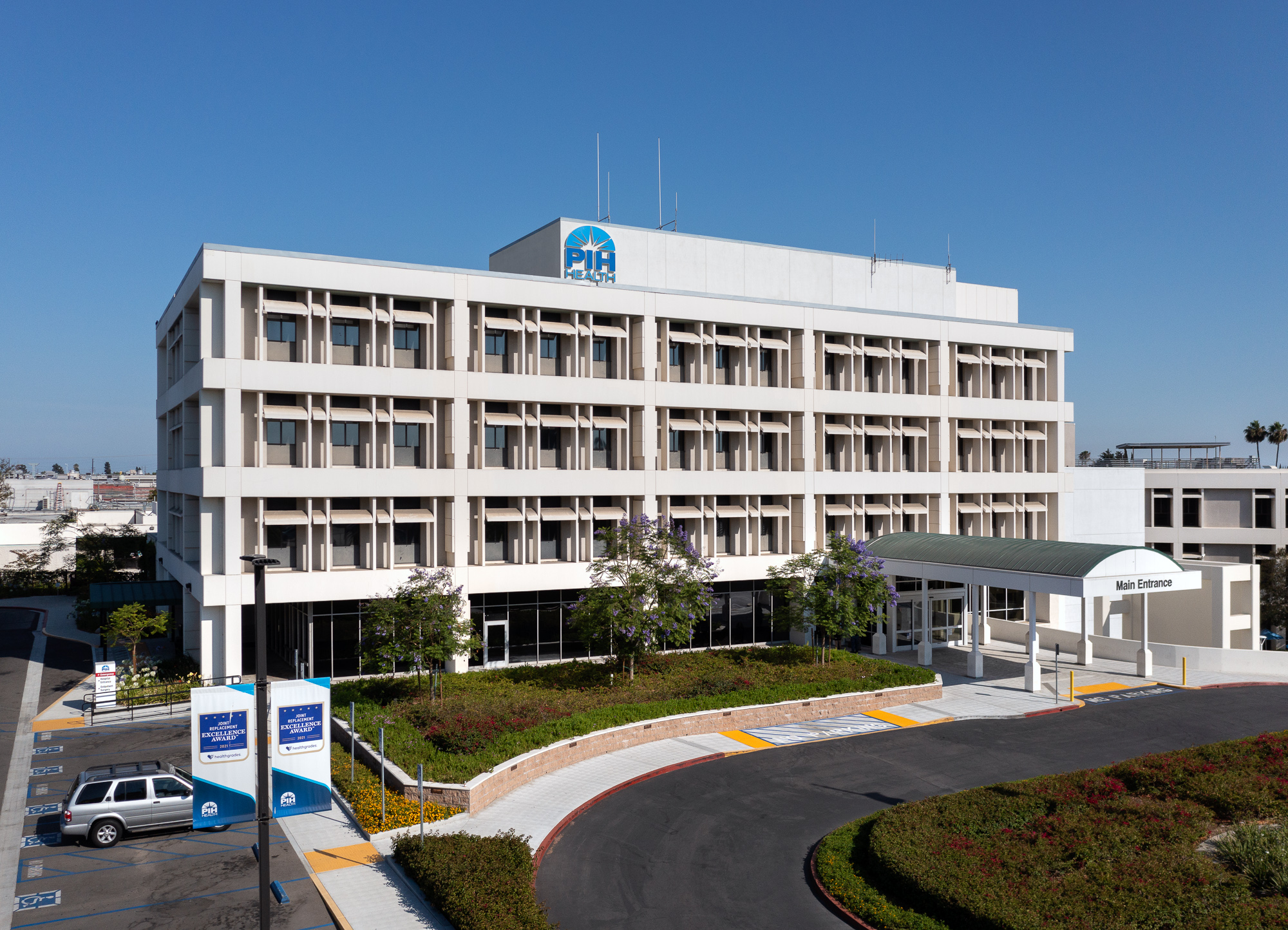
- PIH Health Downey Hospital in 2021

Geography
- Location: 11500 Brookshire Avenue, Downey, California 90241, Downey, California, United States

Organization
- Type: General, Teaching
- Affiliated university: Western University of Health Sciences

Services
- Emergency department: Yes
- Beds: 199

History
- Former names: Virginia Hospital; Downey Community Hospital; Downey Regional Medical Center
- Founded: 1920

Links
- Website: www.pihhealth.org
- Lists: Hospitals in California

PIH Health Hospital – Downey is a non-profit community-based hospital located in Downey, California. The hospital operates a family medicine residency program for newly graduated osteopathic physicians (DO).

According to U.S. News & World Report, the hospital scores highly in patient safety and orthopedics. With 955 employees, the hospital is the 5th largest employer in the city of Downey.

In 2009, the hospital filed chapter 11 reorganization proceedings, citing financial system breakdowns and poor contracts as contributing factors; the hospital also serves a number of local residents that are underinsured or uninsured, contributing to financial challenges. Following the bankruptcy, the hospital was taken over by PIH Health, who also operates Presbyterian Intercommunity Hospital in Whittier and PIH Health Good Samaritan Hospital in downtown Los Angeles. The hospital has since invested in a new cardiac catheter lab, new general chemistry machines and digital mammography technology.

== Graduate medical education ==
The hospital operates two residency training programs for newly graduated osteopathic physicians. The hospital operates a family medicine residency program, which is accredited by the American College of Osteopathic Family Physicians, and a neuromuscular medicine internship, which is accredited by the American Osteopathic Association.

== Former names ==
- Virginia Hospital (1920–1933)
- Downey Community Hospital (1933–1999)
- Downey Regional Medical Center (1999–2013)
