= Western University of Health Sciences =

Private medical university in Pomona, California, U.S.

- Former name: College of Osteopathic Medicine of the Pacific
- Motto: Educare, Sanare, Coniunctim (Latin)
- Motto in English: To Teach, To Heal, Together
- Type: Private research university
- Established: 1977; 49 years ago
- Endowment: $39.6 million
- President: Robin Farias-Eisner
- Academic staff: 332 full-time 1,200 adjunct professionals
- Administrative staff: 700
- Students: 3,724
- Location: Pomona, California, United States; 34.058°N 117.747°W
- Campus: Urban, 22 acres (Pomona) Rural, 50 acres (Lebanon)
- Colours: Burgundy; White; Gold, gray, black (accent)
- Website: westernu.edu

The Western University of Health Sciences (WesternU) is a private medical university in Pomona, California, United States. With an enrollment of 3,724 students (2022–23), WesternU offers more than twenty academic programs in multiple colleges. It also operates an additional campus in Lebanon, Oregon.

Under the banner of WesternU Health, the university operates a variety of patient care facilities in California and Oregon. The Pomona and Lebanon (Oregon) campuses both include a medical center, dental center, eye care institute, pharmacy, and travel health center. WesternU-Pomona also is home to the Pet Health Center, which provides veterinary services. Dental services are offered at the Rancho Mirage campus, while a Los Angeles campus provides optometry services.

Several nonprofit organizations are based at the WesternU Pomona campus, including the Harris Family Center for Disability and Health Policy. The Center for Oral Health, moved from the San Francisco Bay area to the WesternU Pomona campus in 2012. In 2015, the Southern California Medical Museum moved to the Pomona campus.

Founded in 1977, the first program at WesternU was its medical school, the College of Osteopathic Medicine of the Pacific. In 2003, the College of Veterinary Medicine opened, and in 2009 the colleges of dental medicine, optometry, and podiatric medicine opened. In 2011, the university opened an additional campus in Lebanon, Oregon, the College of Osteopathic Medicine of the Pacific - Northwest (COMP-Northwest). In 2015, the university's founding president, Philip Pumerantz, retired. All of the programs at WesternU have professional accreditation and the university is accredited by the Western Association of Schools and Colleges.

== History ==
The Health Education Center building on the Pomona campus, which houses the College Osteopathic of Medicine of the Pacific.

WesternU was established in 1977 as the College of Osteopathic Medicine of the Pacific (COMP), offering the Doctor of Osteopathic Medicine degree (D.O.). This was the first medical school in California to open after a complicated era in the relations of allopathic and osteopathic medicine, notably when the California College of Osteopathic Physicians and Surgeons - only the second DO school in America - briefly became independent as an M.D. granting school before soon evolving into the University of California, Irvine School of Medicine. Upon its foundation in 1977, the WesternU College of Osteopathic Medicine was the only osteopathic medical school west of the Rocky Mountains.

In 1986, the college began offering a second degree, the Master of Science in Health Professions Education. Four years later in 1990, the physician assistant program opened, which in 2000 grew into a master's level program. In 1992, the physical therapy program opened.

In 1996, the Western Association of Schools and Colleges granted accreditation as a full and constituent university, and later that year, what had begun as the College of Osteopathic Medicine of the Pacific was renamed the "Western University of Health Sciences." 1996 also saw the foundation of the WesternU College of Pharmacy. In 1998, the university established the Harris Family Center for Disability and Health Policy. In 1997, the College of Graduate Nursing was established with the first online Family Nurse Practitioner program in California, followed by an entry-level master's degree for students with a BA/BS degree who wanted to become a nurse.

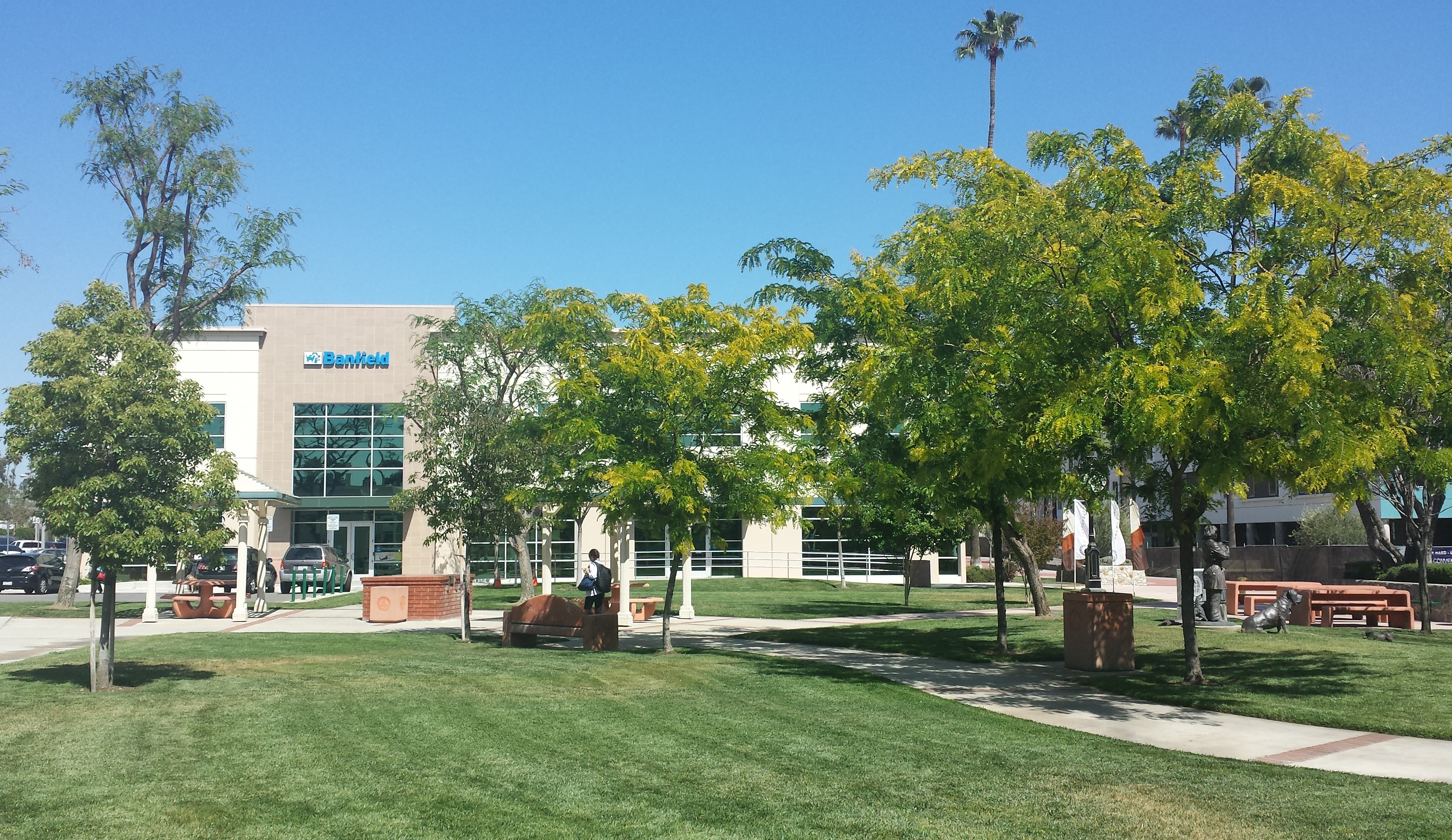
Ethan Allen Park, with the Pet Health Center in the background.

Thereafter, the veterinary college was founded after some initial hesitancy by the American Veterinary Medical Association's Council on Education, the College of Veterinary Medicine opened in 1998 as the first new veterinary medical school in the United States since 1983. Classes began in 2003, and the college earned full accreditation in 2010. As of 2025, the school is one of two veterinary schools in California. The college was the first veterinary medical school in the United States to appoint a woman as dean. In 2008, the university opened the Banfield Pet Hospital to the public. In 2014, WesternU assumed sole operation and management of the pet hospital.

In 2009, three new colleges opened at WesternU: podiatric medicine, optometry, and dentistry. The following year, in 2010, the Patient Care Center opened, offering medical, dental, optometric, podiatric and pharmacy services to the community. In 2011, Western University of Health Sciences opened a new medical school campus in Lebanon, Oregon called the College of Osteopathic Medicine of the Pacific Northwest. In 2012, the Center for Oral Health affiliated with WesternU and moved from the bay area of California to the WesternU campus. The Center for Oral Health is an independent non-profit organization, which focuses on improving oral health.

In January 2015, WesternU began collaborating with colleagues in Scotland affiliated with the UK National Health Service, assisting in the development of a standardized platform for diabetes care called the Scottish Care Information Diabetes Collaboration. In October 2015, WesternU opened a Virtual Reality Learning Center to augment the teaching of anatomy across all colleges. Faculty-led virtual reality technology is used by the schools of dentistry, medicine, veterinary medicine, nursing, pharmacy and health professions. In 2015, the Southern California Medical Museum opened on the WesternU campus. The same year (2015), Pumerantz retired after 38 years as founding president. He was succeeded in 2016 by Daniel R. Wilson. In November 2017, WesternU opened an Eye Care Institute in Los Angeles, which specializes in low-vision rehabilitation.

In 2019, the university received the eighth most applications of any medical school in the United States. In 2019, U.S. News & World Report ranked it 13th among all US medical schools for the percentage of medical graduates going into primary care residencies. The university is the fourth-largest employer in Pomona, with more than 1,000 employees.

On July 8, 2020, faculty members voted "no confidence" in the university's president and asked him to step down. They cited a "lack of transparent communication between faculty members and Wilson, his executive leadership team and the Board of Trustees" as the reasons for their vote. The university's board of trustees formed an ad hoc committee to these concerns.

On October 20, 2020, the board of trustees announced that President Wilson will officially step down July 1, 2021. The board of trustees recognized the president's accomplishments over the past four years and both agreed that "now is an appropriate time to begin the process of identifying a new leader for WesternU." Faculty welcomed the announcement but are awaiting a promised full report on the investigation's findings. In a second communication on October 21, 2020, the board of trustees announced the formation of a Presidential Transition Communications Committee to plan for a successful transition in leadership while addressing shared governance, transparency, accountability, and communication.

In December 2020, WesternU purchased a building in Lebanon, Oregon to house a doctor of physical therapy program. The first class of physical therapy students began courses in July 2021. WesternU administered COVID-19 vaccinations at an immunization center located on its Pomona campus.

Sylvia Manning became the Interim President of the university under the auspices of the Registry for College and University Presidents, which facilitates interim appointments for senior higher education leaders. The search for a regularly appointed President of WesternU concluded with the selection of Robin Farias-Eisner, who is the third president of the university effective March 1, 2022.

== Academics ==
=== Colleges ===
College	Founded	Accreditation
WesternU	1996	Western Association of Schools and Colleges
Health Sciences	1996	American Physical Therapy Association; ARC-PA
Dental Medicine	2009	American Dental Association
Graduate Nursing	1997	Commission on Collegiate Nursing Education CCNE
Optometry	2009	American Optometric Association
Osteopathic Medicine - California	1977	American Osteopathic Association COCA
Osteopathic Medicine - Oregon	2011	American Osteopathic Association COCA
Pharmacy	1996	Accreditation Council for Pharmacy Education
Podiatric Medicine	2009	American Podiatric Medical Association
Veterinary Medicine	2003	American Veterinary Medical Association

=== Programs ===
Through its nine colleges, WesternU offers 21 academic programs, each on a semester schedule. All programs at WesternU are post-baccalaureate and focused on a health sciences profession. All are accredited by the respective national accrediting body. Doctoral degrees include the Doctor of Osteopathic Medicine, Doctor of Dental Medicine, Doctor of Optometry, Doctor of Veterinary Medicine, Doctor of Pharmacy, Doctor of Nursing Practice, Doctor of Physical Therapy, and Doctor of Podiatric Medicine. Several Master of Science (MS) programs are also offered in Pharmaceutical Sciences, Health Sciences, Physician Assistant Studies, Nursing, Biomedical Sciences, and Medical Sciences. A Master of Science in Health Professions Education is offered to provide educational skills to health professionals interested in teaching. Two distance education programs are offered: the Doctor of Nursing Practice (DNP) and Master of Science Nursing (MSN). All other programs are traditional on-campus programs. Further Colleges and Programs are in consideration.

=== Rankings ===
In 2024, U.S. News & World Report ranked Western University of Health Sciences as 117th in Best Medical Schools: Research and tied as 50th in Best Medical Schools: Primary Care out of 193 ranked Best Medical Schools in the United States.

=== Interprofessional education ===
WesternU operates an Interprofessional Education (IPE) program, involving all nine of its colleges. The program began in 2007 and the first phase was implemented later that year. The program goals are to improve understanding of other health professions and to provide and promote a team approach to patient-centered care and health care management, leading to improved patient care.

As a part of the interprofessional education program, students meet in small groups with a faculty facilitator and discuss non-clinical aspects of symptom presentation in complex cases, including interprofessional knowledge and awareness, financial or ethical challenges and communication barriers. Augmentation of clinical IPE rotations with grand rounds and journal clubs is ongoing.

=== Research ===
WesternU conducts research in an array of areas in basic, translational, and clinical sciences. Three primary research strengths include: neurobiology, molecular / metabolic diseases, and infectious disease / immunology. Specific neurobiology subjects include: Alzheimer's disease, central nervous system diseases, genetic disorders, environmental pathologies, and stem cell therapy. Specific molecular and metabolic disease subjects include: cancer, cardiovascular disease, diabetes, and obesity. Research on infections and immunology includes tuberculosis, Mad cow disease, avian flu, and Methicillin-resistant Staphylococcus aureus. Research is funded by the National Institute of Health, the OneSight Foundation, The Potts Foundation, American Cancer Society, American Heart Association, the American Lung Association, and the California Institute for Regenerative Medicine.

== Patient care and education ==
Patient Care Center (Pomona campus) Services include medical care, podiatry, dentistry, pharmacy, and optometry.

Western University of Health Sciences provides patient care in several locations in California and Oregon. WesternU opened its first patient care center, a family practice clinic, in 1984. The Pomona Patient Care Center opened in May 2010, and serves more than 10,000 patients per year. The Patient Care Center includes a Medical Center, Foot & Ankle Center, Eye Care Center, Dental Center and Pharmacy. The center is also home to an accredited diabetes education center. WesternU is a member of the Association of Academic Health Centers. The university also offers post-graduate residency training in medicine in association with partners throughout the Western states.

The university operates the Harris Family Center for Disability and Health Policy, and provides consultation and training to organizations, companies, and hospitals to help them meet the needs of disabled individuals.

== Campus ==
=== Pomona campus ===
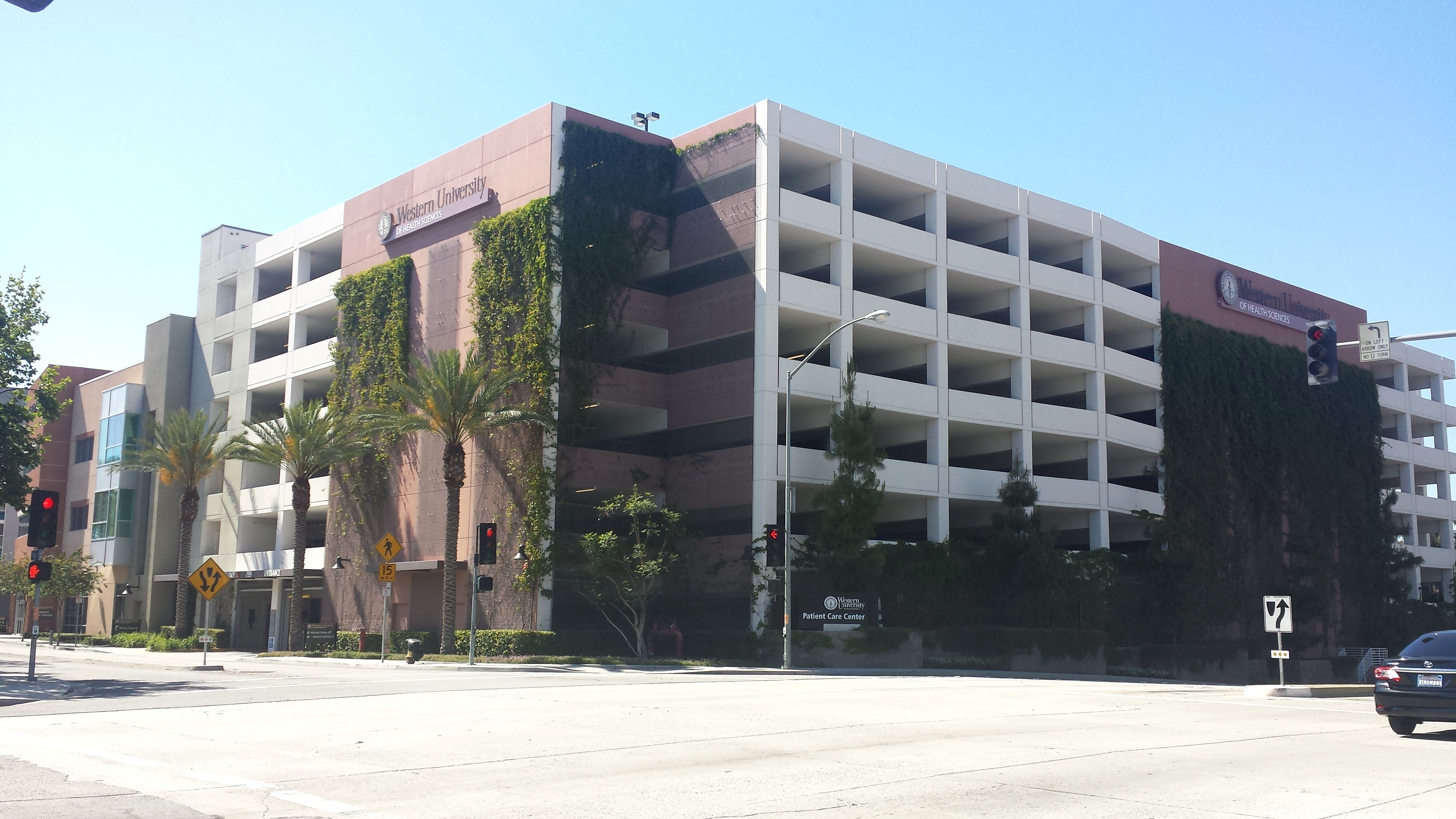
The parking structure at E 2nd and S Towne Avenue.

The main campus of WesternU is located in downtown Pomona, California. Upon the school's founding, a portion of the campus was extensively renovated from an outdoor shopping mall. Since that time, several buildings have been acquired and built, including a patient care center, a pet hospital, classrooms, and research facilities. There are two parks located on the urban campus. The Pomona campus consists of 19 major buildings spanning some seven city blocks along the main "Esplanade," which amounts to a total 22 acres (8.9 ha).

The northeastern corner of campus has the Health Education Center, the Patient Care Center, and a large parking structure. These WesternU buildings opened in 2010, as a part of a $100 million expansion project. The Health Education Center is a 180,000-square-foot teaching and research facility that also houses the colleges of medicine, dentistry, podiatry and optometry. The fourth floor of the center has state-of-the-art research laboratories. The seven level parking structure has 600 parking spaces.

Directly west of the Health Education Center is the WesternU Pet Wellness Center, an on campus pet hospital and clinic. It had been established in 2008 as the Banfield Pet Hospital and transitioned to solely WesternU operation in 2014. The center provides primary care services such as vaccinations, spaying and neutering, microchiping, surgery, dental exams and cleanings, as well as flea, tick and heartworm control. It includes a surgical suite, an x-ray room, a half dozen exam rooms and isolation facilities.

The Daumier is a mixed-use building located south of the pet hospital on 3.6 acres at 3rd and Linden Street. This building was completed in June 2014, at cost of $45 million, and serves as a 173,000-square-foot facility primarily for WesternU student housing but with research and educational support space as well as a fitness center, community pool, media room, and other university offices. The Daumier was designed to LEED gold specifications. The building was named the Daumier after the 19th century French artist Honoré Daumier.

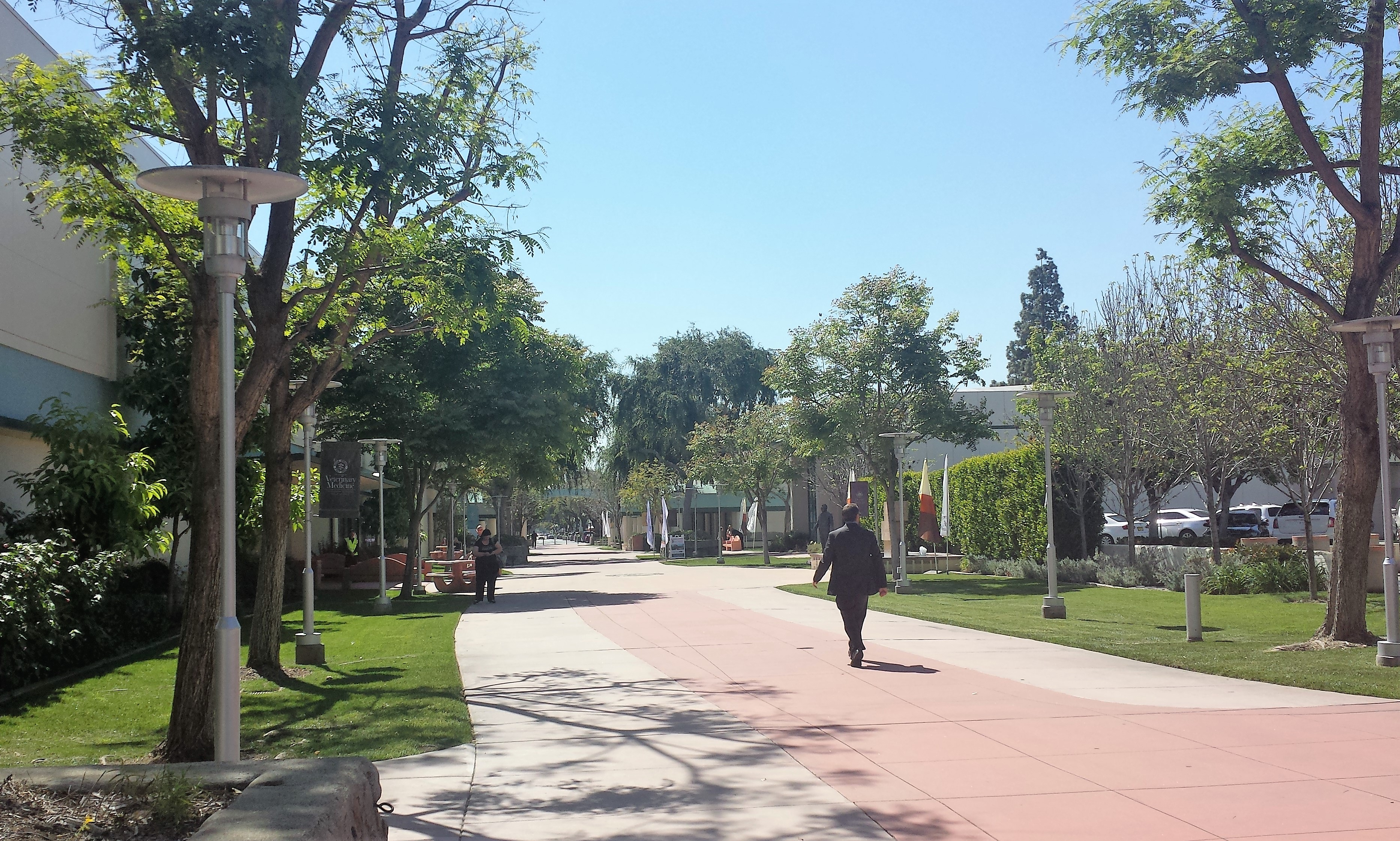
Promenade on campus of WesternU, with the Health Sciences Center to the left.

The central portion of campus contains Ethan Allan Park, the Health Professions Center (HPC), the Veterinary Medicine Center, and the Health Sciences Center. Ethan Allen Park is located directly west of the Pet Wellness Center. In 2006, the park was named in honor of Dr. Ethan Allen, founding chairman of the school's board of trustees. The other park on campus is Centennial Park, a Pomona city park on the west end of campus. Directly south of Ethan Allan Park, the Health Professions Center houses the College of Pharmacy and contains several classrooms, research facilities, and a student commons area. The building was built in 1962 and was previously the Pomona Buffum's department store. The university acquired the building in 1992, after first receiving the option to buy. The Center for Oral Health, a non-profit organization promoting oral health, is based in the Health Professions Center. The Health Sciences Center, directly west of the Health Professions Center, is a two-story, 72,000-square-foot building with the main anatomy laboratories, a laboratory for osteopathic manipulative medicine, and extensive classroom space. The physical therapy school is based in this building, as is the tutoring program. The Health Sciences Center was formerly a Nash Department Store. The university began using the building in 1990, and then purchased it in 1993.

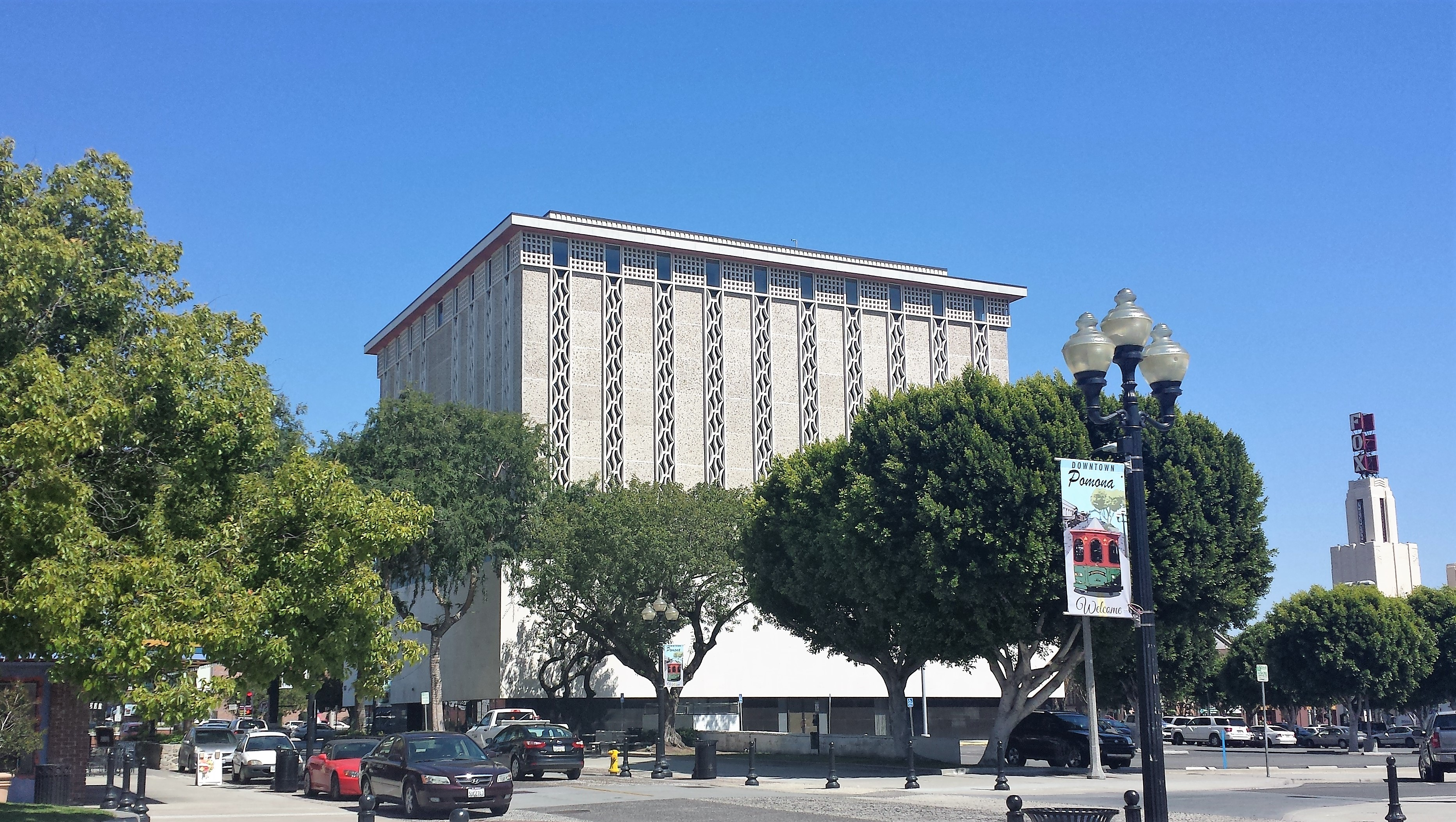
Anderson Tower at WesternU, with the historic Pomona Fox Theater to the right.

The western range of campus contains the Rodney P. Wineberg Center, home to research administration and laboratories, in addition to the Pumerantz Library, and Anderson Tower (formerly known as the Chase Bank building). The Rodney P. Wineberg Center contains 8,550 square feet dedicated to research. The Rodney P. Wineberg Center building was originally a JCPenney. The multi-story, 35,000-square-foot Pumerantz Library is on the west edge of campus. The library opened in that space in 2001, after the university acquired the building in 1998. The building was built in 1929, and previously housed a switching station for the Pacific Telephone & Telegraph company. The Southern California Medical Museum is located in the Nursing Science Center on the WesternU campus.

Anderson Tower demarcates the western edge of campus at Garey avenue and Second Street. This seven-story, mid-century modern 70,000-square-foot building was built in 1963, and WesternU purchased the building from JP Morgan Chase in September 2013. The same month, WesternU reached an agreement with a power company, Washington Gas, to build 2,688 solar panels on three campus buildings. The solar panels were completed in February 2014, and will produce more than 1,100 megawatt hours of energy each year.

=== WesternU-Oregon ===
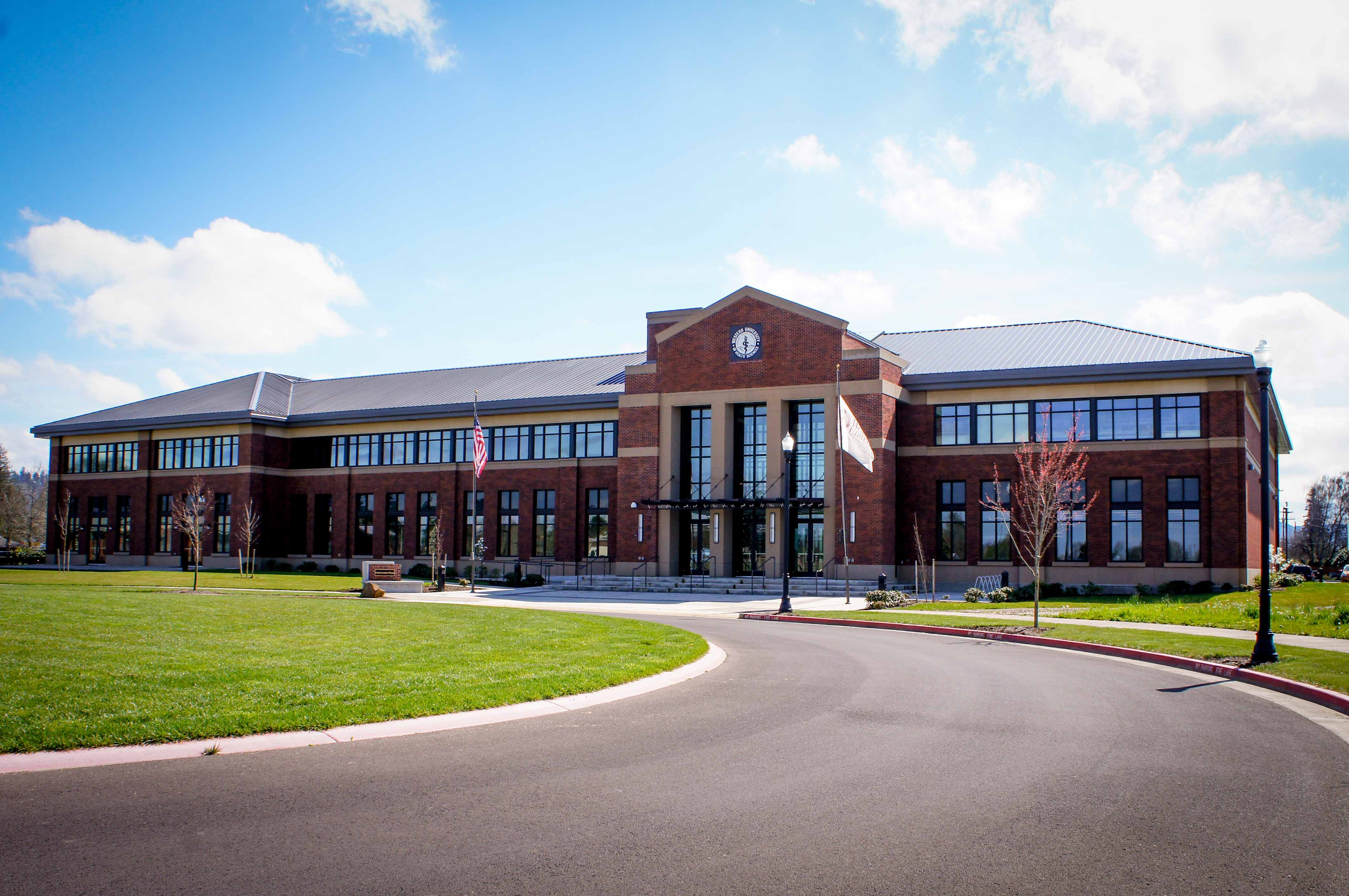
The main building for the Oregon campus

The university also operates a second campus on 50 acres in Lebanon with an official postal address at 200 Mullins Drive. The first program offered at the Oregon campus is medicine (DO), though additional colleges and programs are planned, starting with the College of Health Sciences' Doctor of Physical Therapy program.

The Oregon campus is adjacent to Samaritan Health Services Lebanon Community Hospital, Groundbreaking for the medical school campus began in June 2009, and it opened for classes in August 2011. The new 55,000-square-foot (5,100 m^{2}) building cost about $15 million, and is the main component of a 50-acre medical campus.

=== Students ===
WesternU Demographics
	Students
Asian/Pacific Islander	37.2%
White/Non-Hispanic	34.4%
Hispanic	10.4%
Two or more races	12.1%
Black/African American	2.8%
Race/ethnicity unknown	2.5%

A total of 3,724 students were in attendance at WesternU in the 2022–23 academic year. The average age of WesternU students is 28 years and 62 percent are female; 38 percent male; 37.2% Asian/Pacific Islander, 34.4% are White/Non-Hispanic, 10.4% Hispanic, 12.1% two or more races, 2.8% black or African-American, and the remaining students are of unknown ethnicity (2.5%).

Students at WesternU participate in a vast number of campus clubs and an active student government association. A wide range of professional fraternities are active on campus, including Sigma Sigma Phi, Kappa Psi, Beta Sigma Kappa, Delta Sigma Delta, and Phi Lambda Sigma.

There is a university theater troupe, "Sanus", which hosts regular performance events. In 1985, medical students formed the group "Sanus," the Latin word for "sanity." The students said they used the opportunity to act and perform plays as means of relieving stress. The theater troupe remains active, and students from other colleges also participate.

Other officially recognized student organizations on campus include the following:

- American College of Foot and Ankle Surgeons
- American College of Osteopathic Family Physicians
- American Medical Student Association
- American Medical Women's Association
- American Pharmacists Association
- American Student Dental Association
- American Veterinary Medical Association
- American Academy of Osteopathy
- Lions Club
- Humane Society Veterinary Medical Association

== People ==
WesternU employs 333 full-time faculty and 69 part-time faculty. Some notable alumni and faculty include:

- Clinton E. Adams, DO, Rear Admiral in the US Navy.
- Lee Burnett, D.O. class of 1997, a U.S. Army Colonel and founder of the Student Doctor Network.
- Joseph C. Gambone, DO, author of Essentials of Obstetrics and Gynecology. Gambone Peak on Antarctica was named in his honor in 1970.
- Lawrence B. Harkless, DPM, founding member of the ADA Council on the Diabetic Foot; sometimes described as the "father of diabetic foot care."
- Lee Rogers, professor of podiatry and prior democratic nominee for US Congress in California's 25th district in 2012.

== See also ==
- Medical schools in California
