= Interprofessional education =

Concept in health education

Interprofessional education (also known as inter-professional education or "IPE") refers to occasions when students from two or more professions in health and social care learn together during all or part of their professional training with the object of cultivating collaborative practice for providing client- or patient-centered health care.

== Overview ==
Interprofessional learning involves students learning from students from other professions, as well as learning with students from other professions, for example in the classroom, and learning about other professions. Interprofessional learning and teaching can take place at an academic institution, but also regularly occurs in workplace environments where students gain applicable and practical experience.

Associated terms include "multi-professional education", "common learning", "shared learning", and "interdisciplinary learning". In contrast to multiprofessional education interprofessional education involves interactive learning focused on active collaboration. It is primarily used in the domains of health and social care, where collaborative and patient-centred practice are expected to improve the effectiveness of health care and the quality of life of health & social service users.

There is debate about the effectiveness of interprofessional education in enabling collaborative practice. Research and systematic reviews continue to identify some evidence of effectiveness in changing attitudes.

But more empirical evidence of longer term impact is needed, particularly in respect of effects on service quality and service users' and patients' experience. Nevertheless, more evaluations of IPE have been conducted than for many other commonly accepted educational approaches.

== WHO Study Group and World Committee on Interprofessional Education & Collaborative Practice ==
Recognizing the importance of interprofessional education as one of the innovative approaches that can help tackle the global health workforce challenge, the World Health Organization (WHO) convened a WHO Study Group on Interprofessional Education & Collaborative Practice in 2007 to articulate a greater understanding of this issue within a global context. It was tasked with providing guidance to Member States on how they could use interprofessional collaboration to scale-up and build more flexible health workforces that enable local health needs to be met efficiently and effectively while maximizing resources.

The WHO Study Group engaged various partners and undertook a program of work that culminated in the publication of WHO's Framework for Action on Interprofessional Education and Collaborative Practice in March 2010. The Framework highlights the current status of interprofessional collaboration around the world, identifies the mechanisms that shape successful collaborative teamwork, and outlines a series of action items that policymakers can apply within their local health system. It provides strategies and ideas that can help health policymakers implement the elements of interprofessional education and collaborative practice that will be most beneficial in their own jurisdiction.

The WHO Study Group consisted of almost 30 top education, practice and policy experts from across every region of the world. Overall leadership was provided by Co-Chairs Prof. John HV Gilbert (University of British Columbia & Canadian Interprofessional Health Collaborative) and Dr. Jean Yan (World Health Organization) and a secretariat led by Mr. Steven J. Hoffman (World Health Organization). This led to a report describing the necessity to act on changes in (higher) education and in clinical institutions to implement and secure interprofessional collaborative practice.

Partners included the following organizations:

- Australasian Interprofessional Practice and Education Network
- Canadian Interprofessional Health Collaborative
- European Interprofessional Practice and Education Network
- International Association for Interprofessional Education and Collaborative Practice
- Journal of Interprofessional Care
- National Health Sciences Students' Association, Canada
- Nordic Interprofessional Network
- The Network: Towards Unity for Health
- UK Centre for the Advancement of Interprofessional Education

Since 2012 a World Committee is active, supervising the biennial All Together Better Health (ATBH) Conferences and overarching the regional networks around the world. The management structure of this World Committee was restructured in 2015, with Prof. Andre Vyt serving as first chair.

- World Committee All Together Better Health

== Medical school curriculum ==
Interprofessional education (IPE) is becoming a more common component of medical school curriculum in the United States. IPE programs have existed transiently at various schools since the 1960s, but interprofessional education programs are growing, as they are increasingly viewed as a means of reducing medical errors and improving the health care system. The following medical schools currently have interprofessional programs as a part of their curriculum:

- Linköping University
- University of Washington
- University of Nebraska Medical Center
- Northeast Ohio Medical University
- Oregon Health & Science University
- University of Colorado Anschutz Medical Campus
- University of Illinois College of Medicine
- University of Minnesota
- University of Oklahoma Health Sciences Center
- University of South Florida College of Medicine
- University of Virginia School of Medicine
- Vanderbilt University School of Medicine
- Virginia Commonwealth University School of Medicine
- Virginia Tech Carilion School of Medicine
- Western University of Health Sciences
- Yale University School of Medicine
- University of Arizona
- University of Kansas
- Des Moines University
- Rosalind Franklin University of Medicine and Science
- College of Osteopathic Medicine, Nova Southeastern University
- University of Iowa Carver College of Medicine
- Saint Louis University
- University of Missouri–Kansas City School of Medicine
- University of Missouri-Columbia
- Florida Atlantic University Charles E. Schmidt College of Medicine
- A.T.Still University
- University of Texas Medical Branch/UTMB Health
- Lebanese American University
- D'Youville College

== See also ==
- Health Human Resources
- Journal of Interprofessional Care
