= Sigma Sigma Phi =

American osteopathic honor fraternity

- ΣΣΦ
- Founded: 1921; 105 years ago American School of Osteopathy
- Type: Honor
- Affiliation: Independent
- Status: Active
- Emphasis: Osteopathic medicine
- Scope: National
- Colors: Crimson and Royal blue
- Symbol: Skull, Spine, and Femur
- Flower: Red carnation
- Publication: The Sigma Scope
- Chapters: 48
- Headquarters: c/o Deborah Ann Taubert; Executive Director & Secretary-Treasurer; PO Box 4096; Cedar Park, Texas 78613; United States
- Website: www.sigmasigmaphi.org

Sigma Sigma Phi (ΣΣΦ or SSP), is an American osteopathic medicine honors fraternity for medical students training to be Doctors of Osteopathic Medicine (D.O.). Sigma Sigma Phi was founded in 1921 to preserve the highest class of medical scholastic excellence and includes community service. Criteria for membership into Sigma Sigma Phi include scholastic achievement, class rank, and dedication to community service.

== History ==
Sigma Sigma Phi was founded in 1921 by students at the American School of Osteopathy (now A.T. Still University) in Kirksville, Missouri . These founders were J. A. Atkinson, R. M. Embry, P. I. Etter, J. J. Grace, A. W. King, N. J. McDonald, F. M. Stoffer, R. S. Tell, and Herbert Weber. The founders drew up the organization's constitution and bylaws.

The fraternity's objectives are:

- To further the science of Osteopathic Medicine and its standards of practice.
- To preserve the meaning of and encourage scholastic excellence.
- To continue a high degree of fellowship among its students.
- To cultivate relationships and understanding between the student bodies and officials, such as Faculty members of our Colleges.
- To foster allegiance to the American Osteopathic Association.
- To perpetuate Sigma Sigma Phi by preserving the principles and objectives of the organization.

Sigma Sigma Phi was incorporated and formed a second chapter at the Des Moines Still College of Osteopathy in 1925. In 1927, the American Osteopathic Association recognized Sigma Sigma Phi as the first honor society for osteopathy. The fraternity holds its annual convention during the annual meeting of the American Osteopathic Association, during which it elects its governing grand chapter.

Over the years, most osteopathic medical schools have added a local chapter. In 1962, it had five chapters and 953 initiates. As of 2012, there are 22 active chapters at 24 osteopathic medical school campuses in the United States.

== Symbols ==
Sigma Sigma Phi's emblem is shaped like a sternum, important in hematopoiesis, and includes a skull, spine, and femur. Its symbols are the skull which represents the center of learning, the spine which is the main symbol of osteopathy, and the femur which is in honor of founder Andrew T. Still.

Sigma Sigma's colors are crimson red and royal blue, representing virility and loyalty. Its flower is the red carnation.

== Membership ==
Minimum criteria include:

1. Student chapter membership shall not exceed 25% of the total of the 1st, 2nd, 3rd, & 4th-year classes.
2. Must be an osteopathic medical student (a D.O. student).
3. Must have completed at least one semester of classroom work with high standards.
4. Must believe in a high degree of scholarship and service to college and/or profession.

However, each chapter is free to set more stringent requirements for admission.

== Activities ==
Some of the fraternity's activities include hosting a free neighborhood health fair, teaching CPR and first aid to Boy Scouts, holding a culinary party to collect funds for charity, and getting a sign-language interpreter to introduce sign-language medical terms to the pupils.

== See also ==
- Professional fraternities and sororities
