= Student Doctor Network =

Organization for health profession students in the US and Canada

- Available in: English
- Owner: Health Professional Student Association
- Founder: Lee Burnett
- CEO: Laura Turner
- Website: www.studentdoctor.net
- Commercial: Nonprofit 501(c)(3)
- Registration: Optional
- Users: 830,795 (May 2022)
- Launched: December 12, 1999

Student Doctor Network (SDN) is a nonprofit educational organization founded in 1999 for prehealth and health professional students in the United States and Canada. It focuses on nine core healthcare professions: medical, dental, optometry, pharmacy, physical therapy, podiatry, psychology, rehabilitation medicine, and veterinary medicine.

The Student Doctor Network has over 100 volunteers and over 50,000 active members. The SDN website receives over 2.5 million unique visits and 17 million page views monthly. The site publishes daily articles and features pertinent to medical education.

It also provides tools such as Expert Answers which features curated answers from verified doctors, prehealth advisors and other experts. Additionally, the site offers a school review and interview feedback section and tools such as Choosing a Medical Specialty.

This volunteer organization has published five books (Medical School Admissions Guide, Dental School Admissions Guide, MCAT Pearls, Caribbean Medical School Primer, and republished "How to Choose a Medical Specialty").

The forums are moderated against commercial spam and trolling activity. There is a volunteer staff of over 100 Moderators consisting of students and doctors.

== History ==
Student Doctor Network was launched in 1999 by Lee Burnett, DO (osteopathic.com), James Henderson, MD (medicalstudent.net), and Nancy Sween (medstudents.net / Interactive Medical Student Lounge)
