= John George =

John George may refer to:

== Military ==
- John George (Royal Navy officer) (died 1690), English naval officer and captain of HMS Rose
- John St George (1812–1891), British Army officer
- John George (officer of arms) (1930–2012), Scottish officer of arms
- John George, author of Shots Fired In Anger, see Merrill's Marauders

== Politics and nobility ==
=== Germany ===
- John George, Marquis of Montferrat (1488–1533), last Marquess of Montferrat of the Palaeologus dynasty
- John George, Elector of Brandenburg (1525–1598), Prince-elector of the Margraviate of Brandenburg
- John George I, Prince of Anhalt-Dessau (1567–1618), German prince of the House of Ascania and ruler of the unified principality of Anhalt
- John George, Prince of Hohenzollern-Hechingen (1577–1623), first Prince of Hohenzollern-Hechingen
- John George I, Elector of Saxony (1585–1656), Elector of Saxony, 1611–1656
- John George II, Elector of Saxony (1613–1680), Elector of Saxony, 1656–1680
- John George II, Prince of Anhalt-Dessau (1627–1693), German prince of the House of Ascania and ruler of the principality of Anhalt-Dessau
- John George I, Duke of Saxe-Eisenach (1634–1686)
- John George III, Elector of Saxony (1647–1691), Elector of Saxony, 1680–1691
- John George II, Duke of Saxe-Eisenach (1665–1698)
- John George IV (1668–1694), Elector of Saxony, 1691–1694

=== U.S. ===
- John George (Virginia colonist) (1603–1679), Virginia colonist, landowner, soldier and burgess in the Virginia House of Burgesses
- John George Jr. (born 1946), American businessman, farmer, and politician in the Massachusetts House of Representatives
- John George (California politician) (fl. 1976–1988), American politician, activist, and human rights pioneer
- John George (Oklahoma politician), American politician

=== Other political figures ===
- John George (died 1677) (1594–1677), English politician who sat in the House of Commons in 1640
- Sir John George (Conservative politician) (1901–1972), British Conservative politician
- Jack George (politician) (John Hannibal George, 1901–1996), New Zealand politician
- John George of Ohlau, Duke of Oława, Wołów
- John George (Ontario MPP), Canadian politician

== Sports ==
- John George (athlete) (1882–1962), British athlete at the 1908 Summer Olympics
- John George (sprinter, born 1930), American sprinter, 1952 100 m All-American for the California Golden Bears track and field team
- Johnny George (fl. 1920s), American baseball player
- John George (BMX rider) (born 1958), American BMX racing pioneer
- John George (racing driver) (born 1961), British racing driver
- John Tibar George (born 2000), Tanzanian footballer
- Jack George (basketball) (John Edwin George Jr., 1928–1989), American basketball player

== Others ==
- John George (lawyer) (1804–1881), solicitor general for Ireland
- John George (actor) (1898–1968), American film actor
- John George (magician) (born 1971), American magician
- John George (political scientist) (1936–2008), American political scientist

== Other uses ==
- John George Psychiatric Pavilion, known as John George, in San Leandro, California, named after the local politician of the same name
