= George John =

George John may refer to:

- George John (cricketer) (c. 1883–1944), West Indian fast bowler
- George John (soccer) (born 1987), American soccer player
- Georg John (1879–1941), German stage and film actor
- George John I, Count Palatine of Veldenz (1543–1592)
- George John II, Count Palatine of Lützelstein-Guttenberg (1586–1654)

== See also ==
- George St. John (1878–1934), Australian rules footballer
- George Sibley Johns (1857–1941), American journalist
- John George (disambiguation)
