= Stephen H. Cassidy =

American attorney and politician

Stephen Cassidy

Mayor of San Leandro, California
- In office January 1, 2011 – December 31, 2014
- Preceded by: Tony Santos
- Succeeded by: Pauline Russo Cutter

Personal details
- Born: May 14, 1964 Pittsburgh, Pennsylvania, U.S.
- Died: December 5, 2025 (aged 61)
- Party: Democratic
- Education: Georgetown University (BS); University of California, Hastings (JD)

Stephen H. Cassidy (May 14, 1964 - December 5, 2025) is an American attorney who served as the mayor of San Leandro from January 1, 2011, to December 31, 2014.

== Early life and education ==
On May 14, 1964, Cassidy was born in Pittsburgh, Pennsylvania. As a child, Cassidy lived in Los Angeles, California, where he was a member of the Screen Actors Guild. Cassidy was a featured actor on Saturday morning NBC television series Big John, Little John. He also appeared in "Rag Tag Champs," a 1978 ABC Afterschool Special and an episode of the Lou Grant show in addition to performing in multiple television commercials.

Cassidy graduated from Georgetown University Walsh School of Foreign Service and received his Juris Doctor degree from the University of California, Hastings College of the Law.

== Career ==
=== San Leandro Unified School District ===
Cassidy first ran for political office in 2004, winning the at-large seat on the Board of Education of the San Leandro Unified School District.

Upon taking office, Cassidy called on the school board to build support for a new school construction bond to solve the overcrowding at San Leandro High School.

In August 2006, the school board voted to place a $109 million bond measure, entitled Measure B, on the November 2006 election ballot. Measure B concentrated its funding on San Leandro High School by expanding the campus to address the overcrowding, removing student parking on the main campus to a new, adjacent lot, constructing an arts education center with a performing arts theater, modernizing the Career Technical Education facilities and expanding the school library. Measure B received 68% support from the voters.

As a school board trustee, Cassidy criticized proposals by Governor Arnold Schwarzenegger to weaken state funding for California’s public schools. Cassidy commented on California ranking at the bottom of all states in spending per student and on the impact of Proposition 13 on California public schools: “Since the passage of Proposition 13, our schools have been dependent on Sacramento for the lion’s share of their funding. Today, local property taxes contribute less than 25 cents of every dollar spent on public education. No other governmental agency depends upon car washes, bake sales and magazine subscription drives to survive.”

In 2007, Cassidy organized the largest anti-Iraq War protest that occurred in San Leandro. “No president, Republican or Democrat, is infallible,” Cassidy stated at the rally. “When the president is wrong and the lives of Americans are at stake, it is incumbent upon the people in each community to step forward and voice their opposition.”

Cassidy chose not to seek re-election in 2008. After he completed his term on the school board, Cassidy led a community effort to name the new campus next to San Leandro High School for civil rights champion Fred T. Korematsu, who had deep connections to San Leandro.

=== City of San Leandro ===
In 2010, Cassidy ran for mayor and defeated Mayor Tony Santos, Council member Joyce Starosciak, and two other challengers.

The 2010 San Leandro City Council election, along with the elections in the Cities of Oakland and Berkeley, marked the first use of ranked choice voting or instant-runoff voting in Alameda County. Cassidy trailed Santos narrowly in the first round of voting but won when the final votes were counted.

Cassidy set the goal of San Leandro "becoming a new center of innovation in the San Francisco Bay Area." In January 2011, Cassidy met with Dr. J. Patrick Kennedy, a San Leandro resident, and president and founder of OSIsoft, one of the City’s largest employers. Together, Cassidy and Kennedy "began developing the public-private partnership that would become Lit San Leandro," a high speed, fiber optic broadband network.

In October 2011, the city approved a licensing agreement with Kennedy that allowed the installation of the fiber-optic cables in the existing conduits that circled the city's industrial zone. In 2012, San Leandro was awarded a $2.1 million grant from the U.S. Economic Development Administration to add 7.5 miles to the network. The following year, Julius Genachowski, chairman of the Federal Communications Commission, visited San Leandro at Cassidy's invitation and praised the city "as a model for the country" in developing private-public partnerships to create fiber optic networks. By 2014, the network expansion was completed bringing the total length of fiber network to over 18 miles.

In 2012, Cassidy worked with Alameda County Supervisor Wilma Chan to save San Leandro Hospital from closure by Sutter Health. At the time, San Leandro Hospital was the sole acute care facility in San Leandro. Its emergency room served 26,478 people annually. The City Council endorsed a plan proposed by Chan and advocated by Cassidy for San Leandro to donate $1 million per year for three years. With other funding, the city's donation was intended to keep the hospital open until it could achieve profitability as part of its transfer to public ownership by the Alameda Health System. Cassidy described the subsidy as "an investment that would preserve the hospital's $100 million a year payroll and maintain a local ER in the event of an earthquake or disaster." As of 2018, the hospital remains open and is undergoing a $26.8 million renovation to provide in-patient rehabilitation care.

In 2013, the United States Conference of Mayors adopted a resolution co-sponsored by 18 mayors including Cassidy that called on the federal government to respect state and local marijuana laws and policies. “Voters in states and cities that wish to break the stranglehold of organized crime over the distribution and sale of marijuana in their communities by legalizing, regulating and taxing marijuana should have the option of doing so,” Cassidy stated.

Cassidy proposed flying the rainbow pride flag at San Leandro City Hall during the same week in 2013 that the U.S. Supreme Court heard oral argument in the cases challenging California’s Proposition 8 and the federal Defense of Marriage Act. His action generated publicity in the San Francisco Bay Area and led to the cities of Oakland and Berkeley following San Leandro's lead. Marriage equality is "one of the defining civil rights issues of our day," Cassidy stated. "Flying the flag is a statement by the City Council saying we support marriage equality for same sex couples and that marriage is a fundamental human right that all couples who love each other should be able to enjoy."

Later in 2013, Cassidy, however, suspended a 4-3 decision by the City Council to fly at City Hall on October 1, 2013, the flag of the People's Republic of China to celebrate National Day, a day that honors the 1949 creation of the state by Mao Zedong. Cassidy sided with human rights activists that argued raising the flag signaled the city condoned oppression and abuses by the Chinese government against Tibetans and other peoples. "Those in our community wishing to celebrate the founding of the People’s Republic of China are welcome to use one of our parks, as are other groups celebrating key dates and events of the nation of their origin," Cassidy said.

Cassidy's outreach to the community including holding for the first time by a Mayor of San Leandro separate town halls for San Leandro's Spanish and Chinese speaking communities with translators.

Cassidy did not seek re-election, and endorsed City Council member Pauline Cutter who succeeded him as Mayor of San Leandro.

=== Post-mayoral community service ===
In 2016, Cassidy served as co-chair of the Measure J1 campaign in support of a $104 million school construction bond to renovate and modernize San Leandro public schools. Measure J1 received 74.8% support from the voters.

In 2017 and 2018, Cassidy successfully advocated for the San Leandro City Council to recognize Surlene Grant, San Leandro's first elected African-American City Council member. “By dedicating a public location in Surlene Grant’s name, we show that San Leandro acknowledges the racism of its past, embraces its diversity of today, and is a welcoming community for all in the future," Cassidy wrote.

In the November 2018 elections, Cassidy ran unsuccessfully for a director position on the Eden Township Healthcare District Board. He also served as co-chair of the Measure I parcel tax campaign for San Leandro schools, which passed with 75% support.

In 2020, Cassidy served as chairperson for Measure N which raised $198 million for the San Leandro Unified School District. The same year, he oversaw the successful campaign for Measure VV which increased the real property transfer tax for the City of San Leandro.

In 2024, Cassidy served as chairperson for the successful campaign to pass Measure J, a $174 bond measure for the San Leandro Unified School district.

== Filmography ==
=== Television ===
Year	Title	Role	Notes
1976	Big John, Little John	Stanley	13 episodes
1977	Lou Grant	Wally	Episode: "Christmas"
1978	ABC Afterschool Special	John Fulton	Episode: "The Rag Tag Champs"
