= Charles Leno =

American football player (born 1991)

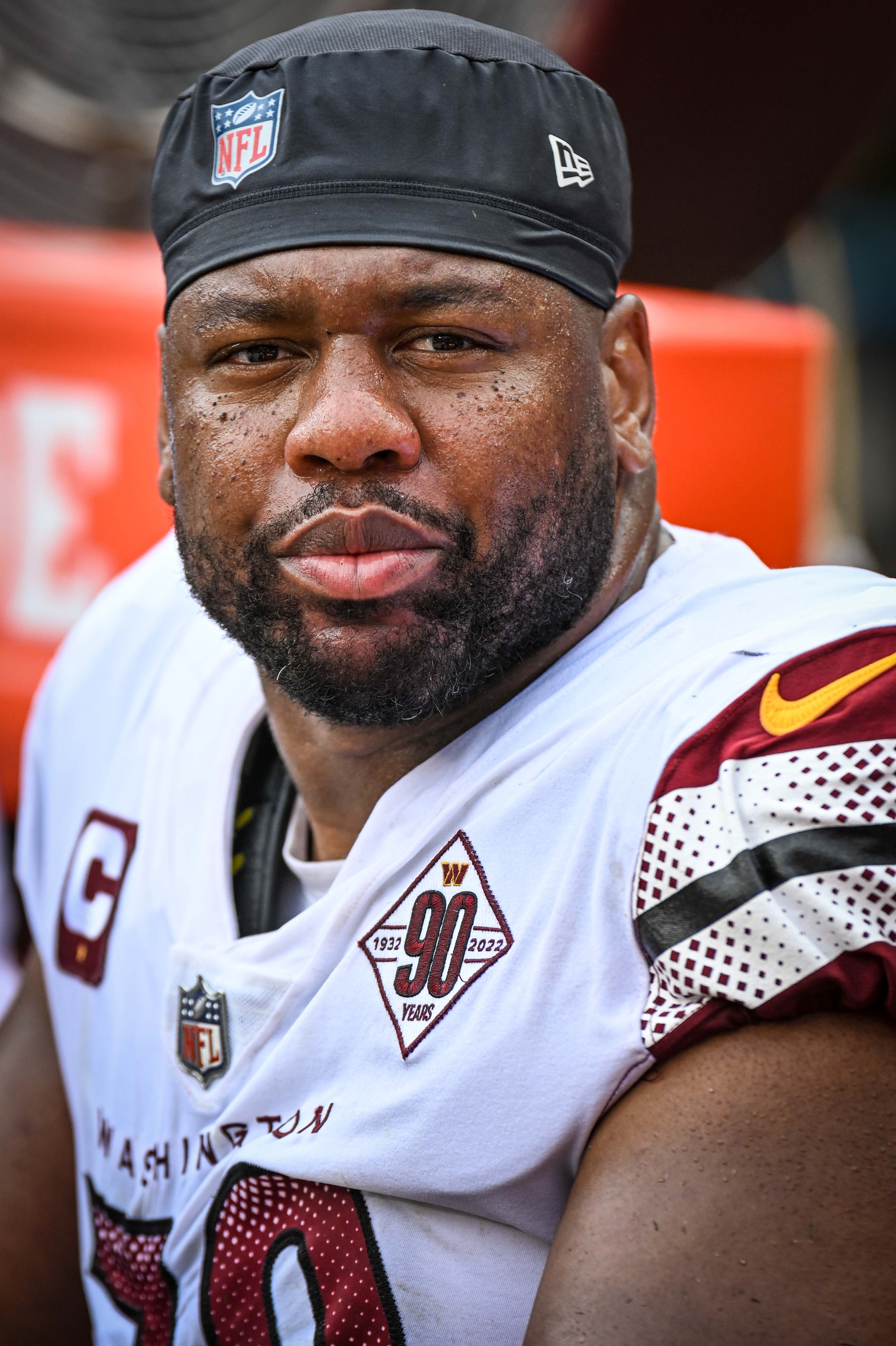
- Leno with the Washington Commanders in 2022

No. 72
- Position: Offensive tackle

Personal information
- Born: October 9, 1991 (age 35); Oakland, California, U.S.
- Listed height: 6 ft 3 in (1.91 m)
- Listed weight: 302 lb (137 kg)

Career information
- High school: San Leandro (San Leandro, California)
- College: Boise State (2009–2013)
- NFL draft: 2014: 7th round, 246th overall pick

Career history
- Chicago Bears (2014–2020); Washington Football Team / Commanders (2021–2023)

Awards and highlights
- Pro Bowl (2018); First-team All-MWC (2013); Second-team All-MWC (2012)

Career NFL statistics
- Games played: 149
- Games started: 141
- Stats at Pro Football Reference

Charles Leno Jr. (born October 9, 1991) is an American former professional football offensive tackle who played ten seasons in the National Football League (NFL). He played college football for the Boise State Broncos and was selected by the Chicago Bears in the seventh round of the 2014 NFL draft. Leno was a seven-year starter for the Bears, making the 2019 Pro Bowl with them, and also played three seasons with the Washington Football Team / Commanders.

== Early life ==
Leno attended San Leandro High School in San Leandro, California, where he played football and basketball, earning three varsity letters in each sport. He was named first-team all-conference as an offensive tackle and second-team all-conference as a defensive end as a senior. He was considered a three-star recruit by Rivals.com.

== College career ==
Leno attended Boise State University, where he was a member of the Boise State Broncos football team from 2009 to 2013. He started 39 consecutive games at offensive tackle for the Broncos during his career, with the final 26 at left tackle. He earned All-Mountain West Conference honors twice in his career: a second-team selection as a junior and a first-team selection as a senior.

== Professional career ==
Pre-draft measurables
| Height | Weight | Arm length | Hand span | 40-yard dash | 10-yard split | 20-yard split | 20-yard shuttle | Three-cone drill | Vertical jump | Broad jump | Bench press |
|---|---|---|---|---|---|---|---|---|---|---|---|
| 6 ft 3 7/8 in (1.93 m) | 303 lb (137 kg) | 34 3/8 in (0.87 m) | 10 1/8 in (0.26 m) | 5.25 s | 1.81 s | 3.03 s | 4.40 s | 7.57 s | 31.5 in (0.80 m) | 9 ft 4 in (2.84 m) | 21 reps |
All values from NFL Combine

=== Chicago Bears ===
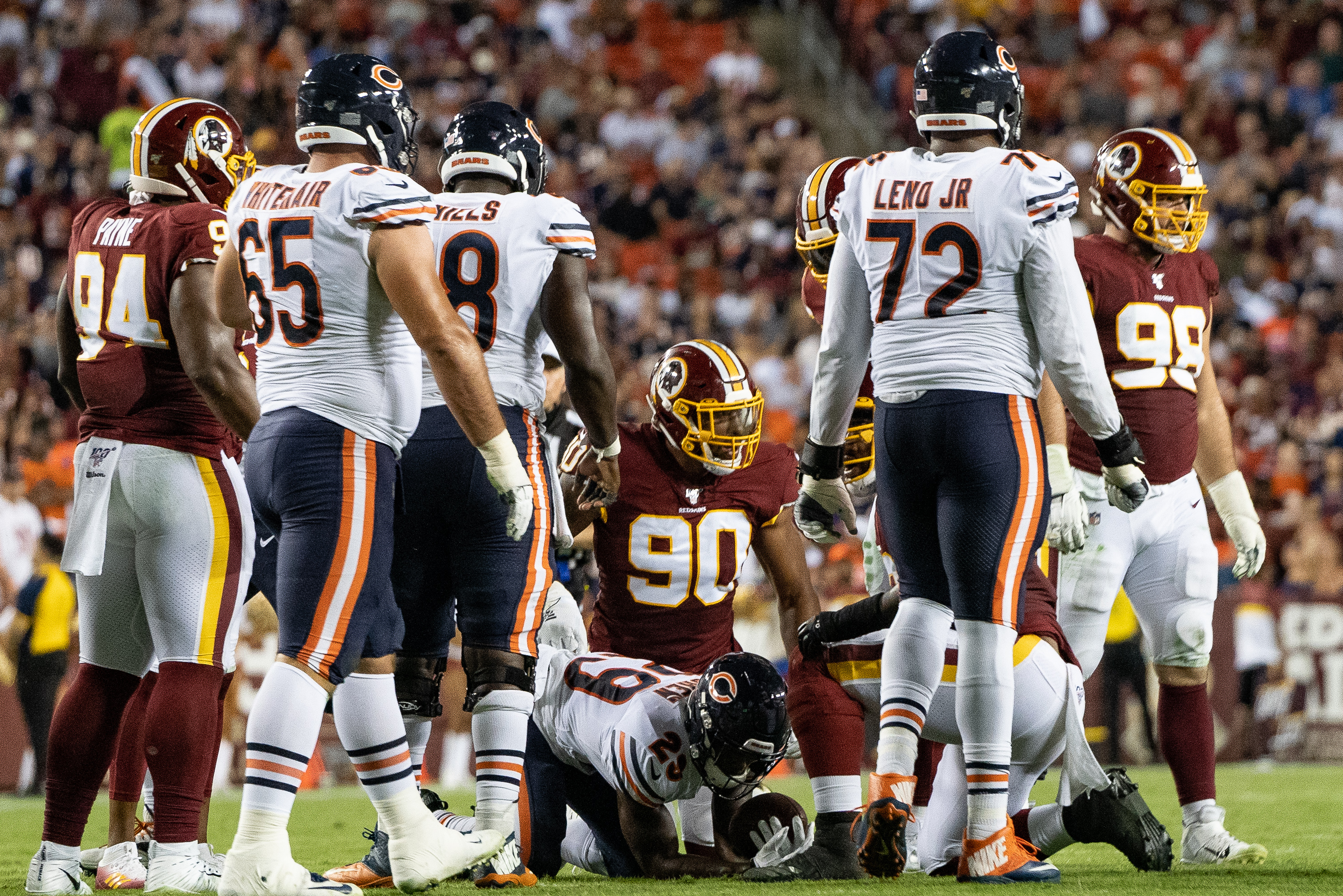
Leno (right) with the Chicago Bears in 2019

Leno was selected by the Chicago Bears in the seventh round (246th overall) of the 2014 NFL draft.

After being a backup as a rookie, Leno was named the full-time starting left tackle in Week 4 of the 2015 season.

On August 23, 2017, Leno signed a four-year, $38 million contract extension with the Bears. He was named to the Pro Bowl in 2018, and was the first Bears offensive tackle to be named since James O. Williams in 2001.

After seven seasons as the Bears starting left tackle, Leno was released on May 3, 2021 after the team selected Teven Jenkins in the second round of the 2021 NFL draft.

=== Washington Football Team / Commanders ===
Leno signed a one-year contract with the Washington Football Team on May 15, 2021. He started all 17 games of the 2021 season and signed a three-year, $37.5 million contract extension on January 5, 2022.

On December 30, 2023, the Commanders placed Leno on injured reserve due to a calf injury before releasing him on March 1, 2024.

=== Retirement ===
Leno officially announced his retirement on October 14, 2025, the two-year anniversary of the miscarriage of his and his wife's fourth child.

== Personal life ==
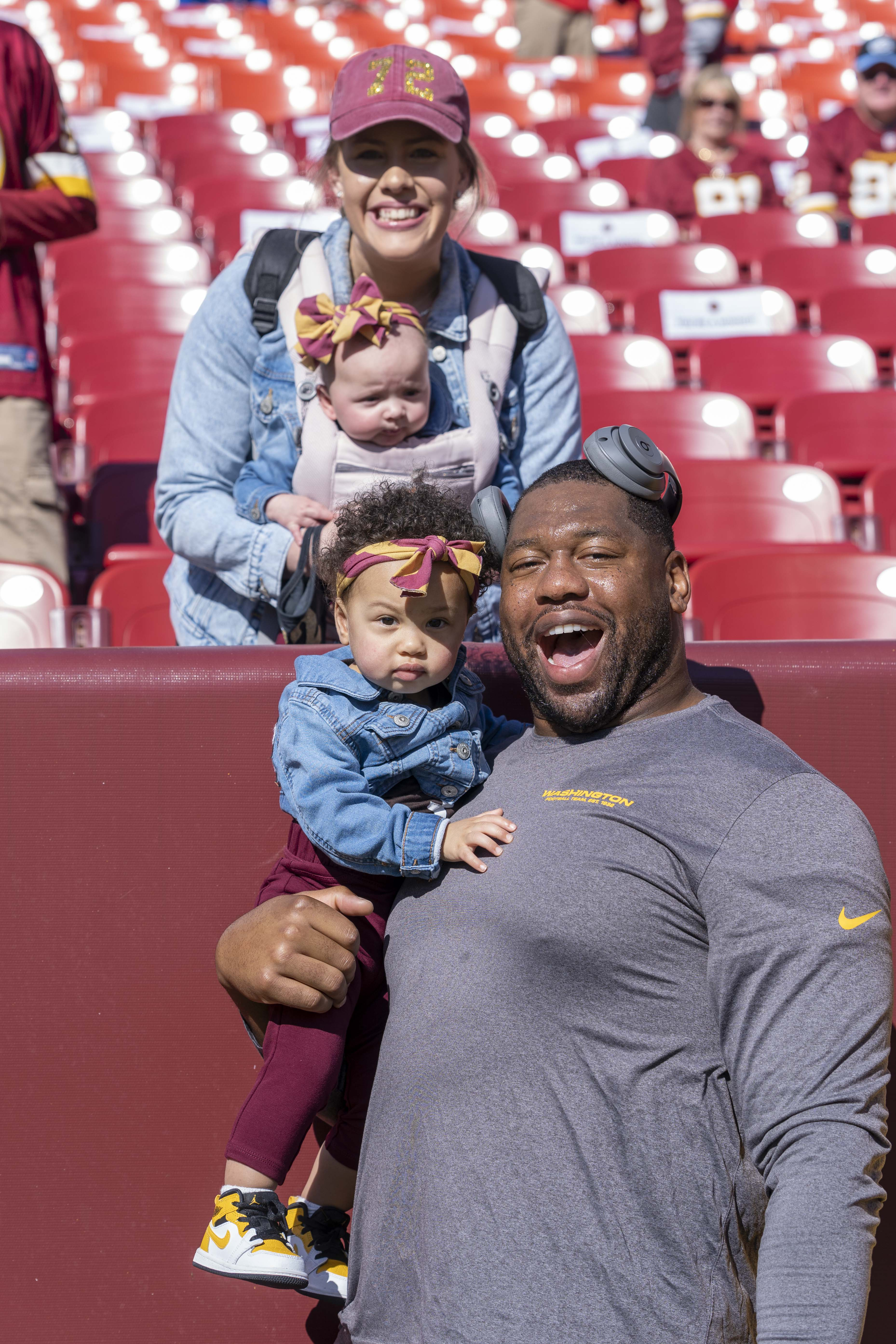
Leno along with his wife and children in 2021

On December 16, 2018, after the Bears defeated the Green Bay Packers to win the NFC North division title, Leno proposed to his girlfriend Jennifer Roth at midfield. Leno is a father of three daughters. Leno and his wife lost their fourth child due to a miscarriage in October 2023.
