= Bancroft Middle School =

Bancroft Middle School may refer to:

- A middle school in the San Leandro Unified School District, San Leandro, California
- A middle school in the Los Angeles Unified School District in Los Angeles, California
- A middle school in the Long Beach Unified School District, Long Beach, California
- The Middle School level at Bancroft School, Worcester, Massachusetts
