= Alameda Health System =

Public health care system

Coordinates: 37°47′52″N 122°13′55″W

Alameda Health System logo

Alameda Health System (AHS), formerly Alameda County Medical Center (ACMC), is an integrated public health care system organized as a public hospital authority.

Formerly operated by Alameda County, California, it now has an independent board of trustees appointed by the Alameda County Board of Supervisors. It operates five hospitals (Alameda Hospital, Fairmont Hospital, Highland Hospital, John George Psychiatric Hospital, and San Leandro Hospital), and four primary care medical clinics (called ambulatory Wellness Centers) within the county. In March 2013, ACMC officially changed its name to Alameda Health System.

== History ==
The system began as the Alameda County Infirmary in 1864. In the 1920s, it became the Fairmont Hospital, the first public rehabilitation center in the western United States. In 1927, Highland Hospital was established in East Oakland. In the 1960s, Ambulatory Health Care Services, a network of neighborhood-based health clinics called Wellness Centers, was established. In the 1992, an acute psychiatric hospital, John George Psychiatric Pavilion, above Fairmont Hospital was opened. In the 1990s, the three hospitals, along with the Wellness Centers, were consolidated to form the Alameda County Medical Center.

Throughout the 1990s, ACMC faced structural deficits resulting from changes in the American health care industry. On July 11, 1996, California State Assembly Bill 2374 (AB 2374) was passed to permit Alameda County to establish a public health authority to manage, administer and control the Alameda County Medical Center. On July 1, 1998, the board of supervisors formally handed control of ACMC to a newly formed Medical Center Hospital Authority.

ACMC received a $200 million bailout from Alameda County in the 1990s, and as of 2013 still owes about $130 million. In addition, a half-cent sales tax from local Measure A has provided financial relief, including $105.5 million in fiscal year, 2010–11; Measure A is designed and implemented to provide additional financial support for many of the medical departments of the Alameda Health System (emergency medical, hospital inpatient, outpatient, public health, mental health and substance abuse services) and is meant to primarily serve indigent, low-income, and uninsured adults, children, families, seniors and other residents of Alameda County that are traditionally seen as very vulnerable populations and those that are usually at proportionately high rates coming to AHS facilities.

Approved in 2013 and enacted in 2014, Alameda Health System took on shared management of the heavily burdened Alameda Hospital, located on Alameda island, which was in dire need of seismic upgrades and other facilities and management care so was in danger of closure. "Under the agreement, the Alameda Health Care District will retain ownership of the property and leases connected with the hospital, while the network will assume responsibility for day-to-day management." This change occurred after the 2010 expiration of the Kaiser Permanente contract for surgical procedures that generated revenue for the hospital. While connected to the wider Alameda Health System, Alameda Hospital nurses and other staff have not floated to other locations and transitions between hospitals or other facilities can be improved.

In 2013, Alameda Health System took ownership of San Leandro Hospital from Sutter Health and ensured its emergency room remained open. Sutter Health had previously announced its intention to close the hospital. At the time, San Leandro Hospital was the sole acute care facility in San Leandro. Its emergency room served 26,478 people annually. The San Leandro City Council endorsed a plan proposed by Alameda County Supervisor Wilma Chan and advanced by San Leandro Mayor Stephen H. Cassidy for San Leandro to donate $1 million per year for three years. With other funding, the city's donation was intended to keep the hospital open until it could achieve profitability as part of its transfer to the Alameda Health System. As of 2021, San Leandro Hospital remains open and underwent a $26.8 million renovation to provide 28 acute rehabilitation beds and administrative offices, along with speech, occupational and physical therapy treatment areas.

The 2014-2015 Alameda County Civil Grand Jury report found that "the lack of leadership and scrutiny on the part of the Alameda Health System board of trustees and the lack of oversight by the county board of supervisors contributed to the financial problems at AHS," noting that the acquisitions of public safety-net essential community care centers Alameda Hospital and San Leandro Hospital contributed to the financial problems with the county medical system.[4] [5]

A new outpatient care center at the AHS flagship location Highland Hospital opened in May 2013. In 2015, an acute care center also opened at Highland with six acute care floors housing the Family Birthing Center, a medical and trauma Intensive Care Unit, as well as other specialized floors.

Further infrastructure development in 2019 included the purchase, design, and implementation of a system-wide electronic health record that facilitated better communication and care within Alameda Health System and outside to the wider network of health services across Alameda County. This EHR was instrumental in assisting clinicians in providing dynamic, coordinated, high-quality care during the 2019-2021 coronavirus pandemic.

In October 2020, nurses and other staff across Alameda Health System went on strike to protest management that was making decisions to put patient care at risk by causing reductions in staffing, leading to exceptionally long wait times in the ER and unsafe patient ratios, while struggling to provide adequate PPE during pandemic care and removing support staff. The strike succeeded in motivating the Alameda County Board of Supervisors to support Alameda Health System in creating a new board of trustees which has replaced business-focused executives with leaders that prioritize patient care over profits.

== Locations ==
=== Hospitals ===
- Highland Hospital, Oakland.
- Fairmont Rehabilitation & Wellness
- John George Psychiatric Pavilion, San Leandro (named after county supervisor John George)

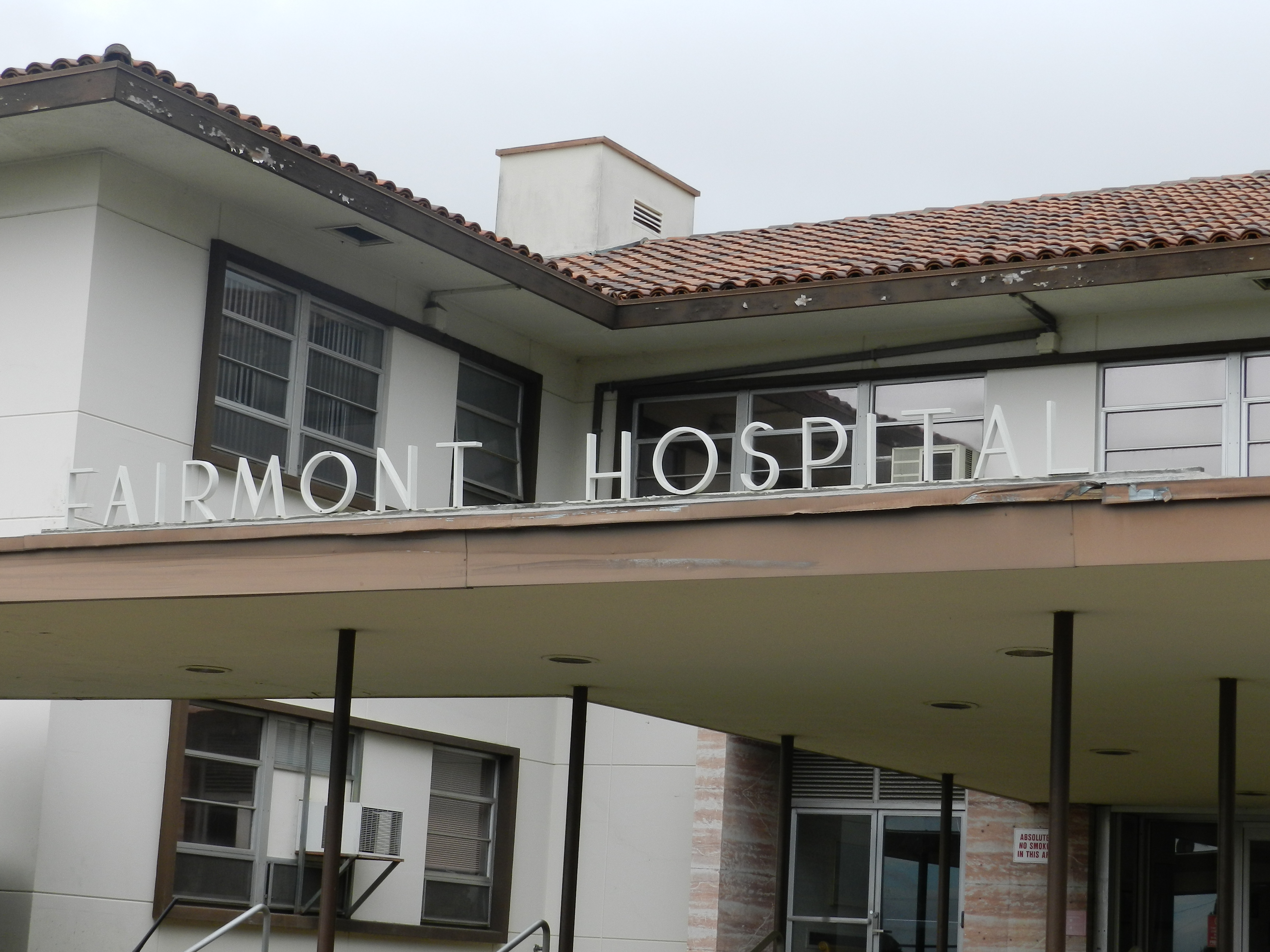
Fairmont Hospital

- Alameda Hospital, City of Alameda
- San Leandro Hospital, San Leandro (formerly operated under Sutter Health)

=== Primary care clinics ===
- Hayward Wellness Center, Hayward
- Eastmont Wellness Center, Eastmont Town Center, Oakland
- Newark Wellness Center, Newark
- Highland Wellness Center, Oakland

== Patient demographics ==
The pie charts reflect the data compiled from ACMC and indicate the demographics of the patient population. The majority of patients are African American and Latino, respectively. Additionally, about 90% of the patient population is a recipient of either Medicare or Medicaid. Research conducted by the Joint Center for Political and Economic Studies indicates that life expectancy in Alameda County is positively correlated with degree of economic opportunity. In its 2012 study, the Joint Center found that the highest economic opportunity quintile lived 7.7 years longer on average than those in the lowest economic opportunity quintile.

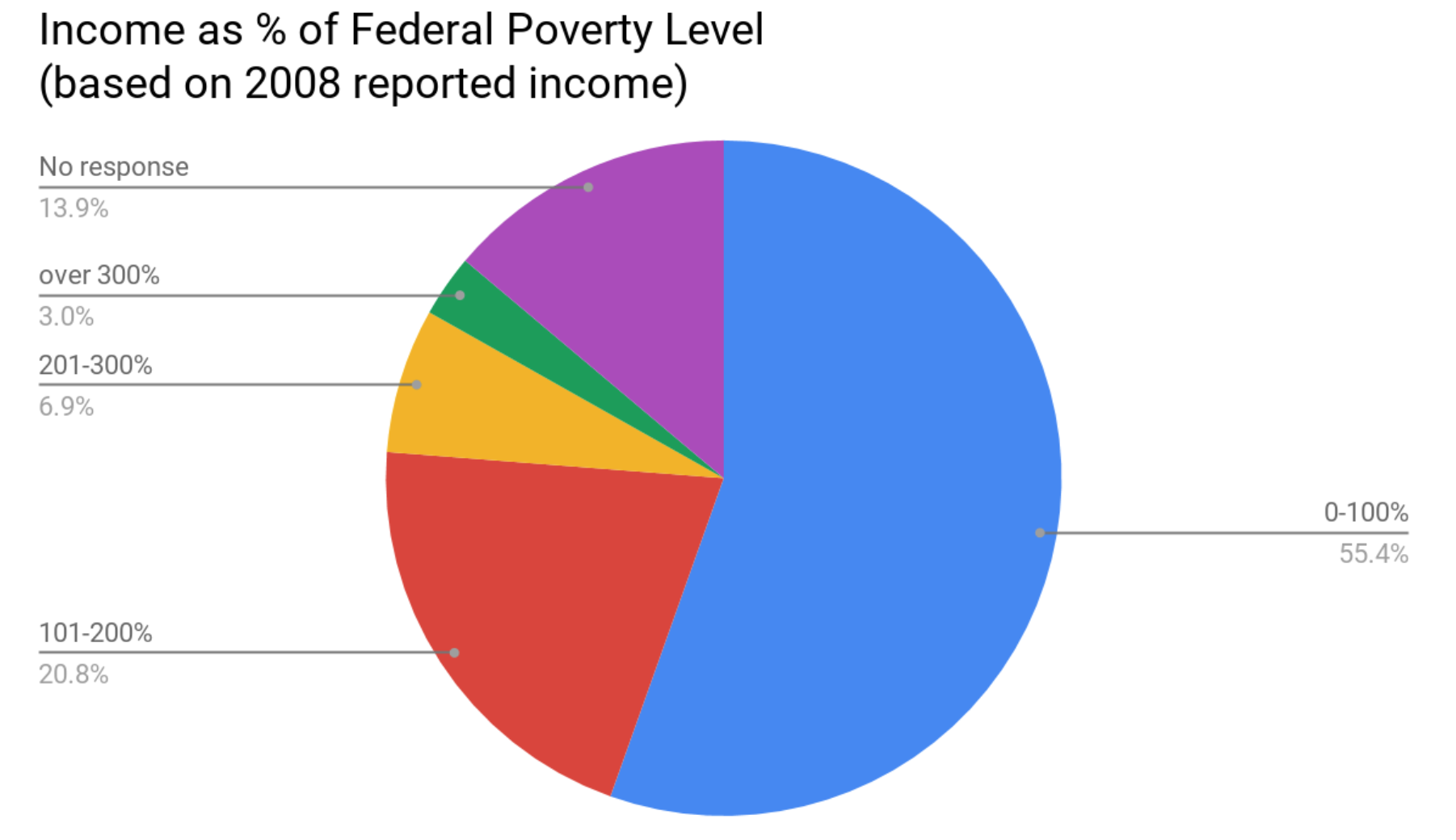

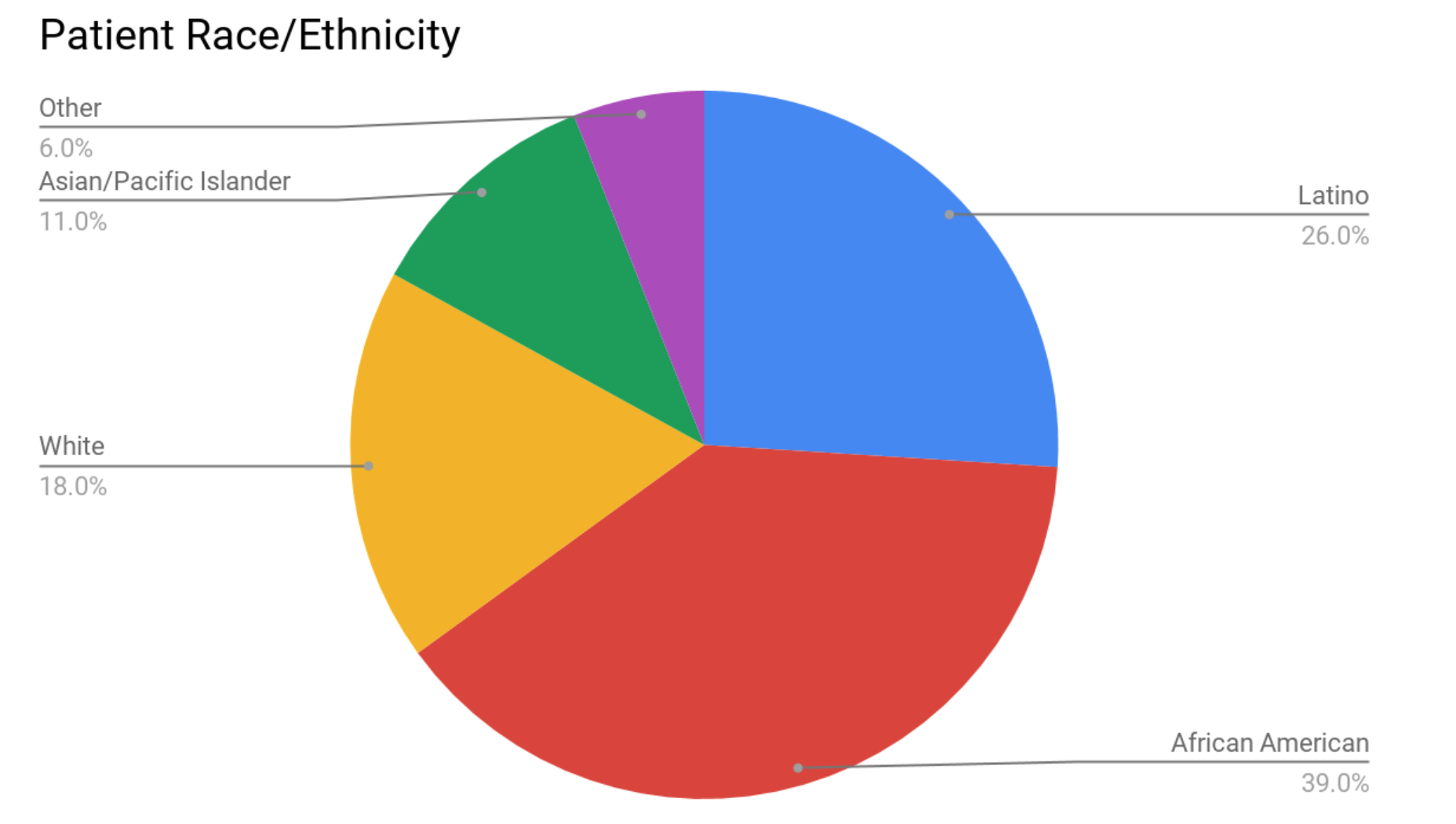

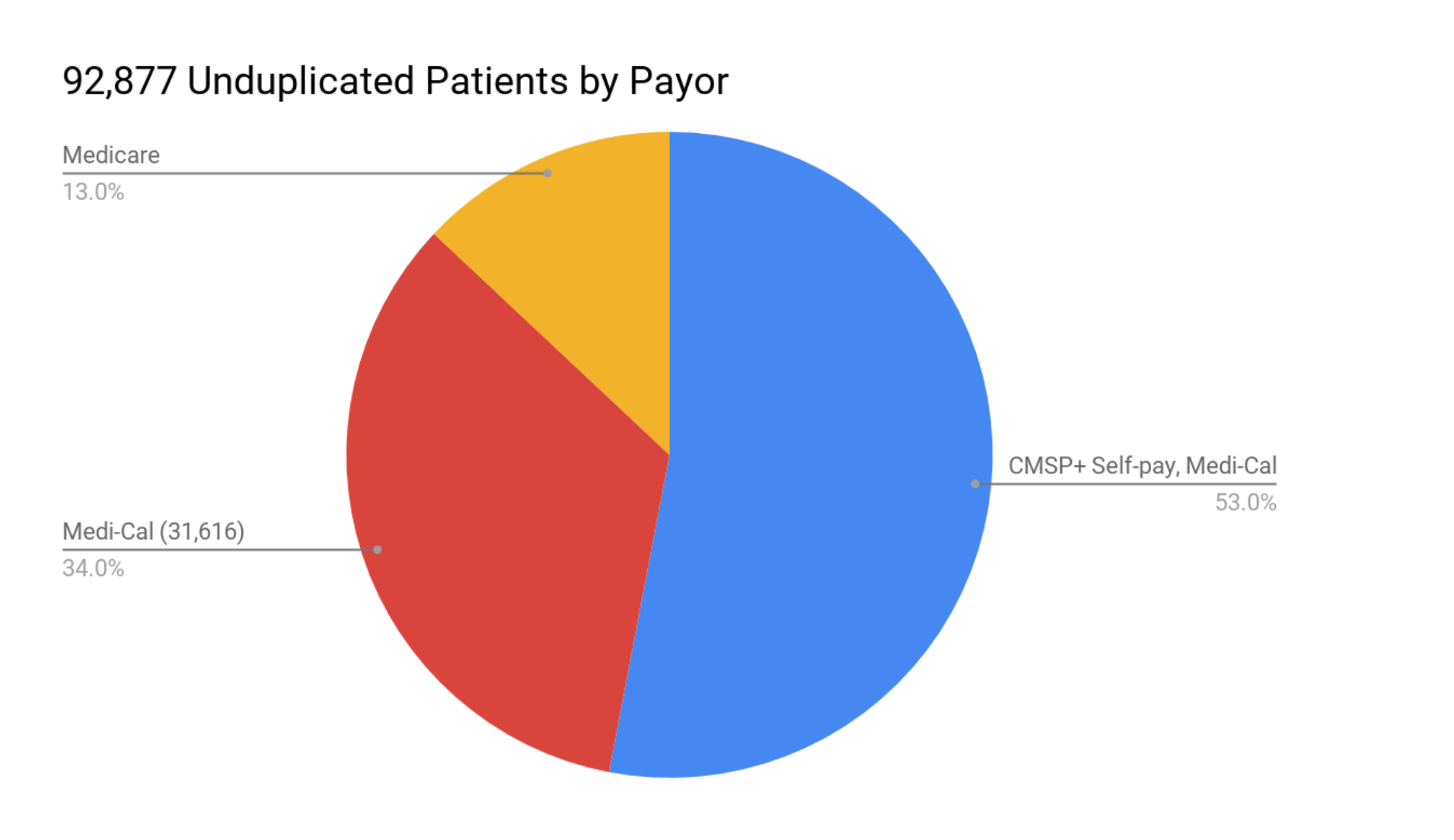

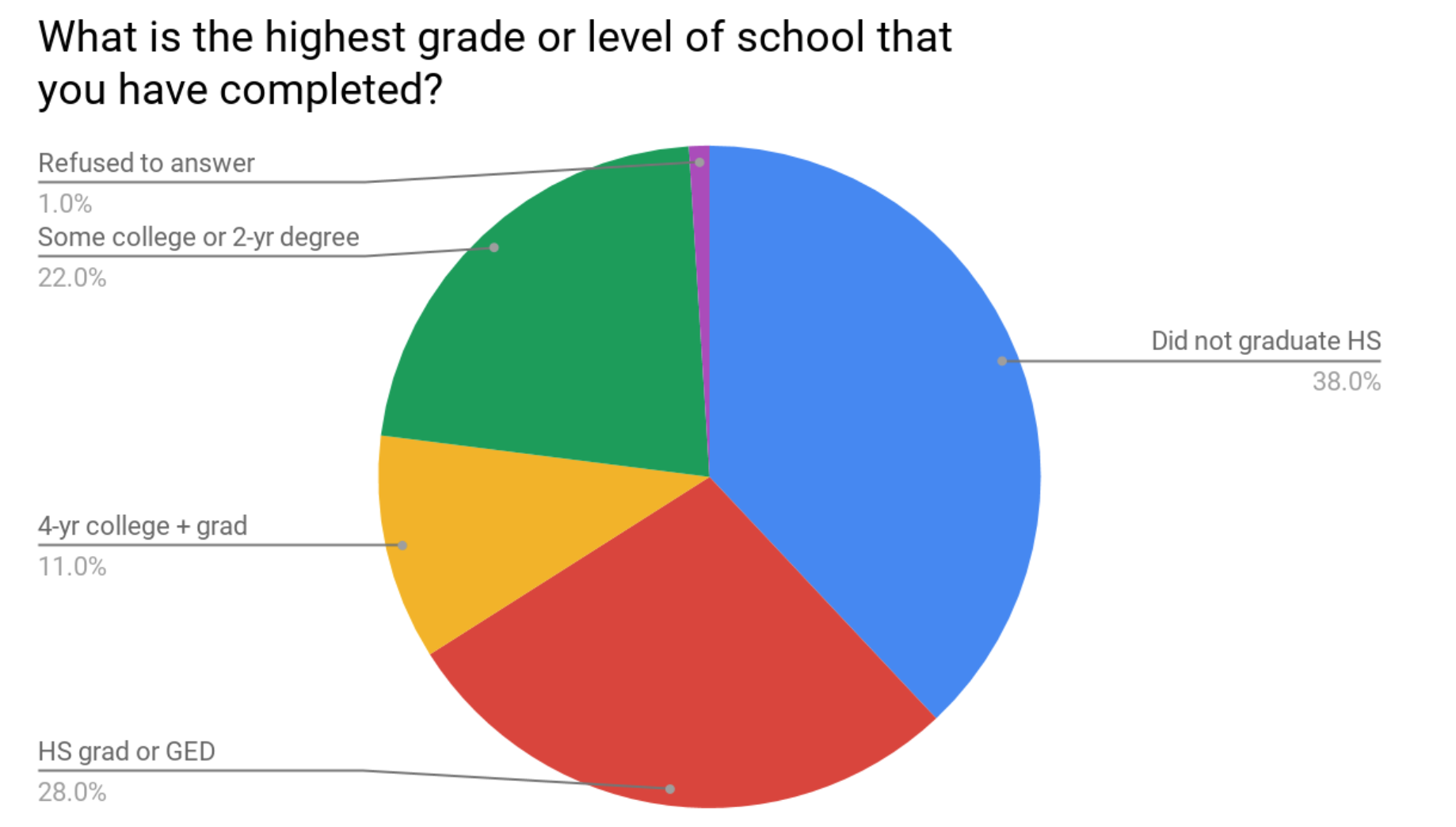

== See also ==
- List of hospitals in California
- A documentary titled The Waiting Room was made in 2012, which details the patient demographics, patient experience and the financial constraints of Highland Hospital in the Alameda Health System.
- A documentary titled Extremis was made in 2016. The film explores how families and palliative care physicians at Highland Hospital make decisions about end-of-life care.
