= Jack George =

Jack George may refer to:

- Jack George (basketball)
- Jack George (footballer)
- Jack George (politician)

== See also ==
- John George (disambiguation)
