= Marviel Underwood =

American football player (born 1982)

No. 25, 28
- Position: Safety

Personal information
- Born: February 17, 1982 (age 44); Oakland, California, U.S.
- Listed height: 5 ft 10 in (1.78 m)
- Listed weight: 200 lb (91 kg)

Career information
- High school: San Leandro (San Leandro, California)
- College: San Diego State
- NFL draft: 2005: 4th round, 115th overall pick

Career history
- Green Bay Packers (2005–2007); Denver Broncos (2007); Oakland Raiders (2008)*; California Redwoods (2009)
- * Offseason or practice squad member only

Career NFL statistics
- Total tackles: 36
- Forced fumbles: 1
- Stats at Pro Football Reference

Marviel Underwood (born February 17, 1982) is an American former professional football player who was a safety in the National Football League (NFL). He was selected by the Green Bay Packers in the fourth round of the 2005 NFL draft. He played college football for the San Diego State Aztecs.

Underwood was also a member of the Denver Broncos, Oakland Raiders, and California Redwoods.

== Early life ==
Underwood attended San Leandro High School in San Leandro, California, where he earned numerous local awards, including All-Hayward Area Athletic League first-team honors as both a running back (1998 and 1999) and cornerback (1999). In his senior year, he rushed for 1,300 yards and 18 touchdowns, had 3 touchdowns on 4 interceptions, and returned 2 kickoffs for touchdowns.

His school's rivalry was with Bishop O'Dowd High School. Ironically, linebacker Kirk Morrison attended Bishop O'Dowd. The two would later attend San Diego State.

== College career ==
At San Diego State, Underwood was named honorable mention All-Mountain West Conference his junior and senior seasons. He finished his college career with 222 tackles (135 solo), 1 sack, 8 tackles for loss, 3 forced fumbles, 2 fumble recoveries, and 1 touchdown on 7 interceptions.

While at San Diego State, Underwood help create an Aztec Defence with Kirk Morrison of the Oakland Raiders, Matt McCoy of the Tampa Bay Buccaneers, Heath Farwell of the Minnesota Vikings, and Jonathan Bailes.

== Professional career ==
Pre-draft measurables
Height	Weight	Arm length	Hand span	40-yard dash	10-yard split	20-yard split	20-yard shuttle	Three-cone drill	Vertical jump	Broad jump	Bench press
5 ft 10 1/4 in (1.78 m)	205 lb (93 kg)	31 3/8 in (0.80 m)	9 1/2 in (0.24 m)	4.55 s	1.65 s	2.72 s	4.21 s	7.08 s	38.0 in (0.97 m)	10 ft 0 in (3.05 m)	19 reps
All values from NFL Combine/Pro Day

=== Green Bay Packers ===
Marviel was selected in the fourth round (115th pick overall) of the 2005 NFL draft by the Green Bay Packers. In July 2005, he agreed to a four-year contract with the Packers, which included a $430,000 signing bonus. His 2006 salary cap value was $457,500.

Backing up his fellow rookie & teammate, Nick Collins, Underwood appeared in all 16 regular-season games during the 2005 season. Misfortune hit Underwood when he tore two ligaments in his right knee in a preseason game against the San Diego Chargers. He missed the 2006 NFL season after being placed on injured reserve. On August 20, 2007, the Packers released Underwood, signing rookie fullback Erryn Cobb in his place.

After spending over two months as a free agent, Underwood was re-signed by the Packers on November 25 when defensive tackle Colin Cole was placed on injured reserve. Although Underwood wore No. 25 during his first two seasons in Green Bay, the number was taken by running back Ryan Grant after Underwood's release. Upon his re-signing, Underwood was assigned No. 43.

The following week, on November 30, Underwood was released again when quarterback Craig Nall was re-signed due to an injury to Brett Favre.

=== Denver Broncos ===
On December 5, 2007, Underwood signed with the Denver Broncos. He was waived by the team on May 28, 2008.

=== Oakland Raiders ===
Underwood was signed by the Oakland Raiders on August 25, 2008. He was waived by the team on August 30.

=== California Redwoods ===
Underwood was selected by the California Redwoods of the United Football League in the 2009 UFL Premiere Season Draft. He signed with the team on September 2. He was placed on injured reserve on November 5.
