= Alameda Hospital =

Geography
- Location: Alameda, California, United States
- Coordinates: 37°45′46″N 122°15′14″W

Organization
- Care system: Private, Medicare, Medicaid
- Type: Community

Services
- Emergency department: Basic, Physician On Duty
- Beds: 161

Links
- Website: www.alamedahospital.org
- Lists: Hospitals in California

Alameda Hospital is a hospital in Alameda, California, United States.

The hospital was founded in 1894. Up until 2002, it was a private non-profit hospital. In 2002, Alameda voters approved a $298 per year parcel tax, and the hospital became a district hospital with the formation of the Alameda Health Care District. The parcel tax was billed as the 'last hope' for the hospital.

In 2010, a controversy arose when residents pointed out that local EMS protocols dictated that stroke victims be routed to Alameda Hospital, even though it was not certified as a stroke center. The preference seemed to date back to a 1983 memo wherein the Assistant City Manager wrote, "...the City must consider what impact a paramedic system might have vis-a-vis the Alameda Hospital. Local concerns have been raised that fewer acute medical cases being referred to Alameda Hospital could greatly impact, or even jeopardize, the hospital’s ability to retain its highly qualified medical staff.” The controversy prompted the hospital to secure stroke treatment certification.

The 2014-2015 Alameda County Civil Grand Jury report found that "the lack of leadership and scrutiny on the part of the Alameda Health System board of trustees and the lack of oversight by the county board of supervisors contributed to the financial problems at AHS," noting that the acquisitions of Alameda Hospital and San Leandro Hospital contributed to the financial problems with the county medical system.

Despite the parcel tax generating $7 million in revenue annually for the hospital, it still struggled. In 2013, the county affiliated Alameda Health System announced it would take over Alameda Hospital, contingent on the parcel tax remaining in place with funds going to the larger health network. At the time, hospital CEO Deborah Stebbins said the hospital "would not be sustainable even in the near term without entering into an affiliation."

In 2016, some Alameda residents began calling for the repeal of the parcel tax, as the hospital, beginning January 1 of that year, had stopped accepting major insurance carriers. One resident said, "All of us have paid to keep the hospital doors open, and now most Alamedans can't use their facilities because they're out of network."

This dispute was resolved in 2018; most commercial insurances are now accepted.

== See also ==
- List of hospitals in California
