= Curtis Goodwin =

American baseball player (born 1972)

- Outfielder
- Born: September 30, 1972 (age 54); Oakland, California, U.S.
- Batted: Left Threw: Left

MLB debut
- June 2, 1995, for the Baltimore Orioles

Last MLB appearance
- August 8, 1999, for the Toronto Blue Jays

MLB statistics
- Batting average: .248
- Home runs: 3
- Runs batted in: 56
- Stats at Baseball Reference

Teams
- Baltimore Orioles (1995); Cincinnati Reds (1996–1997); Colorado Rockies (1998); Chicago Cubs (1999); Toronto Blue Jays (1999)

Curtis La Mar Goodwin (born September 30, 1972) is an American former professional baseball outfielder. He played in Major League Baseball (MLB) for the Baltimore Orioles, Cincinnati Reds, Colorado Rockies, Chicago Cubs, and Toronto Blue Jays.

He attended San Leandro High School in San Leandro, California.
