= Jarrad Page =

American football and baseball player (born 1984)

No. 44, 24, 41
- Position: Safety

Personal information
- Born: October 19, 1984 (age 42); Oakland, California, U.S.
- Listed height: 6 ft 0 in (1.83 m)
- Listed weight: 225 lb (102 kg)

Career information
- High school: San Leandro (San Leandro, California)
- College: UCLA
- NFL draft: 2006: 7th round, 228th overall pick

Career history
- Kansas City Chiefs (2006–2009); New England Patriots (2010); Philadelphia Eagles (2011); Minnesota Vikings (2011)

Career NFL statistics
- Total tackles: 248
- Forced fumbles: 4
- Fumble recoveries: 4
- Interceptions: 12
- Stats at Pro Football Reference

Jarrad Matthew Page (born October 19, 1984) is an American former professional football player and baseball player. He played football as a safety in the National Football League (NFL).

Page played college football and college baseball for the UCLA. He was selected by the Kansas City Chiefs in the seventh round of the 2006 NFL draft and also played for the New England Patriots, Philadelphia Eagles and Minnesota Vikings. After his football career, he played baseball as an outfielder for the San Francisco Giants organization.

== Early life ==
Page grew up in San Leandro, California, attending Bancroft Middle School and San Leandro High School, where he was the top safety for the SLHS team. As a junior, he earned all-state honors. He earned second-team all-state honors as a senior, recording 99 tackles, two sacks, and five interceptions as well as rushing 84 times for 1,014 yards and 16 touchdowns, and catching 18 passes for 432 yards and four touchdowns. He also played basketball and baseball, and was selected three times in the MLB draft before beginning his NFL career.

== College career ==
Following high school, Page attended the University of California, Los Angeles, where he started 10 games as a true freshman in 2002. He finished the season with 43 tackles and two interceptions and was a first-team freshman All-America selection. As a sophomore, he started 12 games at safety, picking up 55 tackles and three interceptions, earning him honorable mention All-Pac-10 Conference honors. In 2004, as a junior, Page started 11 games and finished with 79 tackles, second on the team, as well as three interceptions and was again named as honorable mention all-conference. In his 2005 senior season, Page started 12 games and recorded 72 tackles and one interception.

Page also played baseball at UCLA, starting 57 games as a centerfielder in 2004 and 2005. He hit four home runs and had 27 RBI. He was selected in the 5th round of the 2002 MLB draft by the Milwaukee Brewers, 32nd round of the 2005 MLB draft by the Colorado Rockies and in the 7th round of the 2006 MLB draft by the Los Angeles Angels of Anaheim, but chose to pursue his football career instead.

== Football career ==
Pre-draft measurables
Height	Weight	Arm length	Hand span	40-yard dash	10-yard split	20-yard split	20-yard shuttle	Three-cone drill	Vertical jump	Broad jump
6 ft 0 3/8 in (1.84 m)	239 lb (108 kg)	32 3/4 in (0.83 m)	9 3/8 in (0.24 m)	4.51 s	1.59 s	2.69 s	4.14 s	6.68 s	38.0 in (0.97 m)	10 ft 7 in (3.23 m)
All values from NFL Combine/Pro Day

=== Kansas City Chiefs ===
Page signed a 3-year contract with the Chiefs after being drafted in the seventh round (228th overall) of the 2006 NFL draft. Page played in all 16 games during his rookie season, starting two. He finished with 38 tackles, one sack, three interceptions, and nine special teams tackles. In 2007, Page returned to start all 16 games at free safety, recording 64 tackles on the season, as well as three interceptions and one forced fumble.

For a second straight season, Page made 16 starts in 2008, notching a career-high 83 tackles, four interceptions, and two forced fumbles, while tying for the team lead with 10 passes defended. In 2009, Page started the first five games of the season, picking up 19 tackles, before suffering a shoulder injury. He was inactive for the next two weeks, and was placed on injured reserve on November 4 with a calf injury, ending his season.

Following the 2009 season, Page became a restricted free agent but did not sign his tender from the team until September 3, after requesting a trade.

=== New England Patriots ===
On September 4, 2010, Page was traded to the New England Patriots for an undisclosed draft choice. He played in the team's first six regular season games before missing the next six games with an injury. He returned in Week 13 against the New York Jets, recording a season-high five tackles. Page finished the 2010 season with 12 tackles and two interceptions in 10 games played, making one start.

=== Philadelphia Eagles ===
On August 2, 2011, Page signed with the Philadelphia Eagles. He became the starting strong safety in the preseason to replace an injured Nate Allen, but was benched during a week five loss to the Buffalo Bills. Page was released on November 16.

=== Minnesota Vikings ===
Page signed with the Minnesota Vikings on November 29, 2011, and became a free agent after the season.

== Baseball career ==
=== Los Angeles Dodgers ===
Page attended an open tryout for the Los Angeles Dodgers during spring training on March 1, 2012 and signed a minor league contract with the team on March 10. The Dodgers assigned him to the Rancho Cucamonga Quakes in the Class-A California League on April 23. In 8 games with the Quakes, Page hit .040 (1 hit in 25 at-bats) and he was released on May 29.

=== San Francisco Giants ===
On July 24, 2012, Page signed a minor league contract with the San Francisco Giants.
