= San Leandro High School =

Coordinates: 37°43′4.87″N 122°8′36.31″W

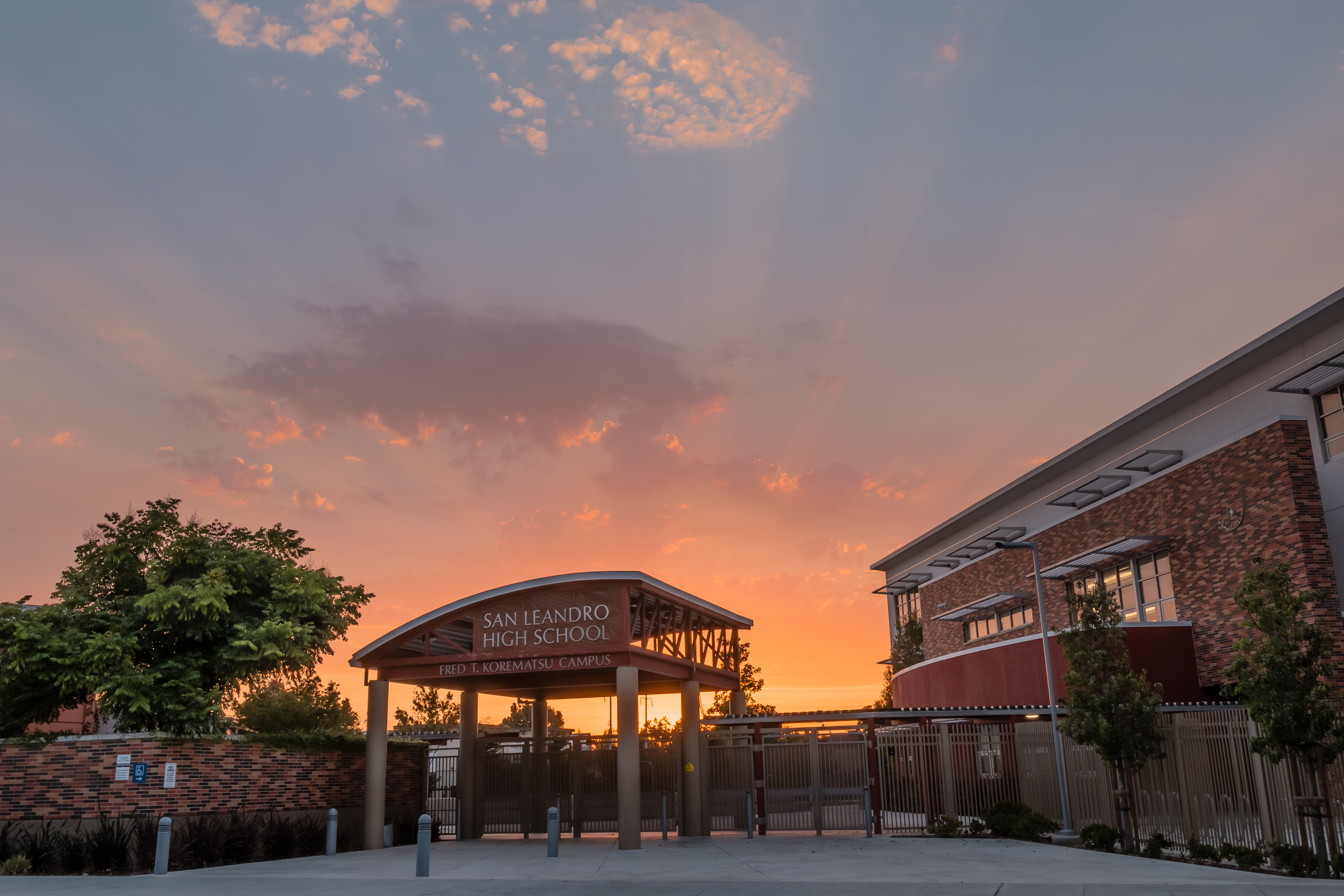

Location
- 2200 Bancroft Avenue; San Leandro, California; United States

Information
- Type: Public
- Established: 1949
- School district: San Leandro Unified School District
- Principal: Maite Barloga
- Faculty: 121
- Teaching staff: 119.98 (FTE)
- Grades: 9–12
- Enrollment: 2,488 (2023–2024)
- Student to teacher ratio: 20.74
- Campus type: Suburban
- Colors: Red, blue
- Mascot: Pirates
- Newspaper: The Cargo
- Yearbook: Anchors Aweigh
- Information: (510) 618-4600
- Website: www.slusd.us/slhs/

San Leandro High School (SLHS) is a four-year public high school in San Leandro, California, USA.

== Academics ==
Academic courses include Advanced Placement (AP) and Honors courses. SLHS has specialized programs, including the Academy of Business & Finance (BA), San Leandro Academy for Multimedia (SLAM), Science, Technology, Robotics, Engineering, and Mathematics Academy (STREAM), and Social Justice Academy (SJA).

Career Technical Education (CTE) courses include Auto Technology, Engineering & Design, Graphic Design, and Wood Shop.

== Facilities ==
The current San Leandro High School building opened in 1949.

In 2007, land was purchased for a new building to house the freshman (9th grade) class in order to relieve overcrowding at SLHS. The freshman campus, which opened in 2010, is named the "Fred T. Korematsu (FTK) Campus" after civil rights activist Fred Korematsu. The FTK campus is located at 13701 Bancroft Avenue, one block from the main campus. As of the 2017–2018 school year, the FTK campus houses the math and foreign language department for all grade levels, and is no longer an exclusively for freshman campus.

In 2011, the new Arts Education Center opened. It includes a green screen room, control room, two sound booths, five classrooms, and a 552-seat performing arts theater.

== Fine arts ==
Visual arts classes include drawing, sculpture, and fashion design. The music program features marching band, jazz band, wind ensemble, freshmen band, freshmen orchestra, advanced orchestra, choir, and Notables. The drama department organizes theater and musical productions each fall and spring. The San Leandro Academy for Multimedia (SLAM) includes courses in photography, videography, and multimedia.

== Athletics ==
Sports at the school include football, cross-country, tennis, golf, volleyball, water polo, basketball, soccer, wrestling, track and field, swimming, badminton, baseball, and softball.

== Notable alumni ==
- Mark Bellini, former NFL wide receiver Indianapolis Colts
- Chris Cannizzaro, former MLB catcher (New York Mets, San Diego Padres)
- Jared Cunningham, NBA guard (Sacramento Kings)
- Tamara De Treaux, actress who played the title character in motion scenes in E.T. the Extra-Terrestrial
- Dennis Dixon, former NFL quarterback, Pittsburgh Steelers, Baltimore Ravens and Buffalo Bills
- Curtis Goodwin, former MLB outfielder (Cincinnati Reds, Baltimore Orioles)
- Jermaine Jackson, NFL wide receiver and return specialist (New Orleans Saints)
- Keshad Johnson, basketball player
- Arthur Larsen, tennis player, ranked number 1 in the U.S. in 1950 and number 3 in 1955
- Charles Leno, NFL offensive lineman (Chicago Bears)
- Russell Means, leader of the American Indian Movement
- Julian Nash, former MLS forward (San Jose Earthquakes, Houston Dynamo)
- Jarrad Page, former NFL safety (Kansas City Chiefs, New England Patriots, Minnesota Vikings) and minor league baseball outfielder (Los Angeles Dodgers)
- Dawn Robinson, singer; founding member of R&B vocal group En Vogue
- Tim Stokes, former NFL offensive lineman (Washington Redskins, Green Bay Packers)
- Marviel Underwood, former NFL safety (Oakland Raiders, Green Bay Packers)
- Icehouse Wilson, former MLB player (Detroit Tigers) and college football player (St. Mary's College)
- Queenie Mae Villaluz, singer, member of pop vocal group Boys World
