= George St. John =

Australian rules footballer

Personal information
- Full name: Ronald George Williams St. John
- Born: 1889; Port Melbourne
- Died: June 1, 1965 (aged 75–76); Box Hill.
- Original team: Railways United
- Position: Half-forward

Playing career^{1}
Years	Club	Games (Goals)
1908–09	Richmond	4 (1)
1911	Melbourne	1 (0)
Total		5 (1)
- ^{1} Playing statistics correct to the end of 1911.

George St. John (14 April 1878 – 19 February 1934) was an Australian rules footballer who played with Richmond and Melbourne in the Victorian Football League (VFL).
