= John George (magician) =

American magician

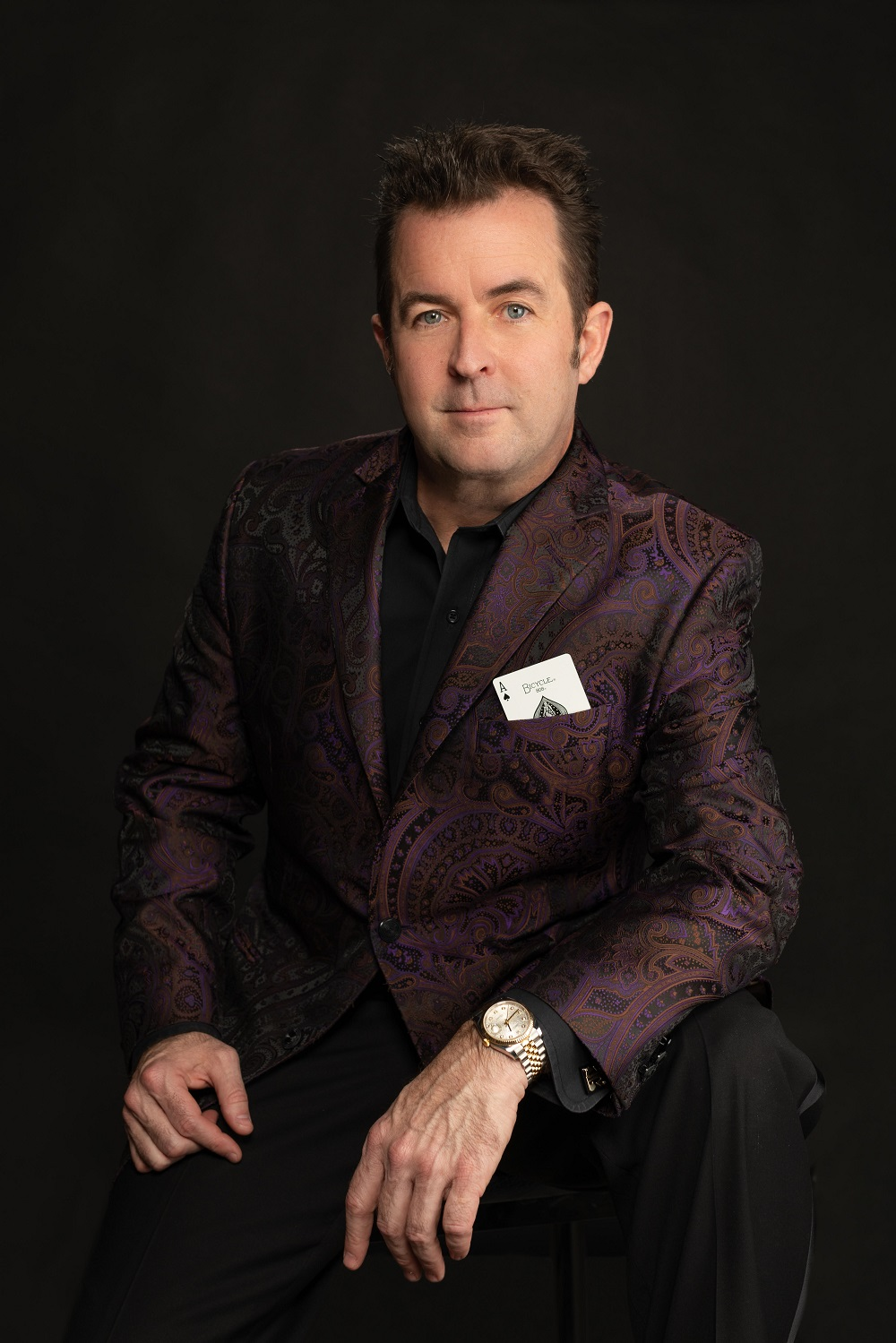
- Born: June 24, 1971 (age 54); Los Angeles, CA, U.S.
- Occupation: Magician
- Years active: 1995–present
- Spouse: Devon Renee Fancher (m. 2004)
- Website: johngeorge.com

John George Fancher (born June 24, 1971), known professionally as John George, is an American magician. Working professionally since 1995, John George has performed at magic venues throughout the country and abroad while winning awards in a wide variety of magic competitions.

== Early years ==
John George was born in Queen of Angels Hospital in Los Angeles, California, to mother Joanna Fancher and father Gary Fancher. His father was a teacher at Pioneer High School and worked part-time at Disneyland as a ride operator. John George got his initial interest in magic from his father, who would perform tricks for the family every year around Christmas. Also through his father, he was able to get free admittance into Disneyland, where he first met Dana Daniels, a strolling magician employed by the park. Seeing Daniels perform at the park and employee picnics further inspired John George's early interest in magic.

John George attended California State University, Fullerton and graduated first in his class with a Bachelor of Fine Arts degree. He gave a commencement speech during his graduation ceremony. His original emphasis was on woodworking, with the goal of making magic props and illusions for magicians. Under the guidance of Frank E. Cummings III, he crafted a wooden unicycle, which he sold to Irving Lipton, owner of the largest and most famous wood working collection in the world. After graduating, he worked for Carl Williams at Custom Magic, a designer of magical apparatuses for top magicians, including Lance Burton and David Copperfield. Some of the props that John George made for Custom Magic are in some of the finest collections of magic, including the collection of Robert Albo. After starting his career as a performer, John George has continued to build props for his own use.

== Career ==
=== Magic career ===
In 1995, John George met Johnny Ace Palmer, who would become his lifelong friend and mentor. Their friendship led him down the path of a professional magician. He began his career that same year, performing at private parties, corporate events and various restaurants around Southern California. Years later, both Palmer and John George performed at Disneyland for several years.

He is a member of the Magic Castle and has performed there regularly throughout his career. While auditioning for membership, John George met fellow illusionist Doug Brewer. The pair formed a magical partnership called the Magical Misfits, performing together for more than six years at venues including the Hilton Waterfront Beach Resort.

As a solo performer, he is still the resident magician at the Waterfront Beach Resort, where he has appeared since 1995. In addition to his regular performances at the resort, he hosts charity galas there for the Make-A-Wish Foundation. He also has a residency at Warren & Annabelle's, a venue for magical acts in Lahaina, Hawaii.

John George's act incorporates sleight of hand, mentalism, card manipulation, coin magic, cups and balls, levitation and Rubik's Cubes as well as comedy and crowd interaction. Over the course of his career, he has performed at the private parties of many celebrities, including Nicolas Cage, Francis Ford Coppola, Drew Barrymore and Paul McCartney. He also performed at the red carpet premiers of The Prestige, Maleficent and WALL-E.

=== Magic competitions ===
John George has competed and won awards in a range of magic competitions, including:

- First Place – 1998 International Brotherhood of Magicians Gold Cups Competition
- People’s Choice – 1998 International Brotherhood of Magicians Gold Cups Competition
- First Place – Society of American Magicians Gold Medal Competition
- Silver Medal Award of Merit - Society of American Magicians
- First Place - Florida State Championship for Close-Up Magic

=== Speedcubing ===
John George became a speedcubing enthusiast after watching Will Smith solve a Rubik's Cube in the film The Pursuit of Happyness. He has participated in World Cube Association competitions with the Rubik's Cube and Pocket Cube. His personal records in competition are 26.75 seconds with the Rubik's Cube and 12.41 seconds with the Pocket Cube.

While attending his first competition, John George met and befriended speedcubing champion Tyson Mao, who trained Will Smith in cubing for The Pursuit of Happyness. In addition to competing, John George has staffed speedcubing events organized by Mao and co-created a DVD tutorial on speedcubing with Mao: You Can Solve the Cube.

== Personal life ==
John George resides in Southern California with his wife, Devon. He has constructed an 18-seat theater for magical performances in his home, named The Harrington at Crescent Glen after his grandfather and namesake, John George Harrington, a battalion chief for LA Country Fire. The theater is accessed by a hidden entrance and features a castle design motif.
