= San Leandro Unified School District =

School district in California, United States

Address
- 835 E. 14th Street, Suite 200 San Leandro, Alameda, California, 94577; United States
- Coordinates: 37°41′44.63″N 122°9′37.96″W

District information
- Type: Public
- Grades: K-12
- President: James Aguilar
- Superintendent: Dr. Mike McLaughlin
- Asst. superintendent(s): Dr. Kevin Collins, Dr. Sonal Patel, & Dr. Zarina Zanipatin
- School board: James Aguilar, Peter Oshinski, Monique Tate, Liz Toledo, Leo Sheridan, Evelyn Gonzalez, Diana Prola
- Accreditation: Western Association of Schools and Colleges
- NCES District ID: 0634680
- District ID: 0161291

Students and staff
- Enrollment: 8715 (2021-2022)
- Teachers: 426.4 FTE (2008-09)
- Staff: 693

Other information
- 2007 API: 709
- Average Class Size: 28.4
- Ratio: 20.4
- Website: www.slusd.us

San Leandro Unified School District is a publicly funded unified school district in San Leandro, Alameda County,California on the eastern shore of San Francisco Bay, between Oakland to the northwest and Hayward to the southeast. The district has 12 schools and 447 teachers, with a total enrollment of 8,729 students in kindergarten through 12th grade.

== Staff ==
Superintendent Michael McLaughlin was placed on paid administrative leave on August 18, 2026 and is under investigation after complaints of unwanted advances towards another district official he oversees. Assistant Superintendent of Educational Services Sonal Patel is serving as acting superintendent during McLaughlin's absence.

In 2008–09, the district employed 447 classroom teachers, filling the equivalent of 426.4 full-time positions. Teaching staff were assigned primarily as follows: 182 in self-contained classrooms, 193 in subject area classrooms, nine in vocational education classrooms, and 35 in special education classrooms. Certified staff also included 43 administrators and 46 staff in pupil services.

Full teaching credentials were held by 95.1% of teaching staff. University and District interns constituted 4.9% of the staff, with no teachers holding emergency credentials. Annual salaries ranged from the lowest offered of $49,363 to $91,058. The average teacher salary was $70,877. Teachers had an average of 13 years experience.

Teachers were 64.4% White, 8.3% Asian, 9.8% Hispanic, 7.2% African American, 2.9% Filipino, with remaining individuals having provided multiple or no responses or belonging to groups with less than 2% representation.

=== Notable staff ===
Former California Treasurer and Attorney General Bill Lockyer served on the district's board of directors at the beginning of his political career. Two mayors of San Leandro, Stephen H. Cassidy and Pauline Cutter, also began their political careers on the school board.

== Students ==
=== Demographics ===
In the school year of 2008–09, students were 39.7% Hispanic, 16.4% African American, 15.6% Asian, 13.1% White, 8.7% Filipino, with remaining individuals having provided multiple or no responses or belonging to groups with less than 2% representation. More than half of enrolled students qualified for free or reduced price meals (53.2%). Compensatory education classes were provided to 17.2% of students and 27.1% were classified as English learners. 183 students were enrolled in alternative education, including 216 in independent study, 71 in alternative schools and programs of choice, and 21 in opportunity programs.

The majority of English learners spoke Spanish (1,587). Other languages spoken included Cantonese (216), Filipino (183), Vietnamese (158), and Arabic (51).

=== Academic performance ===
In 2005–06, 504 students graduated from district schools, of whom 208 met the course requirements for entrance to the University of California or California State University systems. The dropout rate was 1.7%, based on 45 students dropping out of grades 9–12. The 4-year derived dropout rate was 7.2%, compared to a countywide average of 12.8% and a statewide average of 14.1%.

In 2006–07 assessments tests, 37% of students were rated proficient and above in language arts, compared to 48% countywide and 43% statewide. In math, 35% rated proficient and above, compared to 44% countywide and 40% statewide. The average Academic Performance Index (API) score was 709.

In 2018, the California State Department of Education selected James Madison Elementary as one of 21 elementary schools across Alameda County, and the only school in San Leandro, as a 2018 California Distinguished School.

Advanced Placement Program

In 2018, the College Board Advanced Placement named the San Leandro Unified School District a District of the Year for being the national leader among medium-sized school districts in expanding access to Advanced Placement (AP) courses while simultaneously improving AP Exam performance. The San Leandro Unified School District was one of 447 school districts across the U.S. and Canada that achieved placement on the annual AP District Honor Roll.

From this list, three AP Districts of the Year were selected based on an analysis of three academic years of AP data. SLUSD was chosen for the 'medium' district population size, which is defined as having between 8,000 and 49,999 students. SLUSD was the only district in the state and only three in the nation who were honored with this recognition.

== Fiscal ==
Budgeted revenues for FY 2006-07 were $68,228,376. The revenue per student was $7,972, compared to the statewide average of $8,923 for all unified districts. The district has put four bond and parcel tax propositions in the ballot since the mid-1980s. The November 1994 bond proposal failed, with a 62.1% favorable vote (two-thirds required to pass). The March 1997 bond passed, with 69.2% of the vote, providing $53,850,000 for renovation and new construction. The April 2006 parcel tax of $0.012 per square foot failed, with 60.8% of the vote. The November 2006 General Obligation bond for $109,000,000 to renovate and modernize schools, and reduce overcrowding, passed, with a 68.66% favorable vote.

== Schools ==
The district operates eight elementary schools, two middle schools, one high school, and one continuation school. The district has no operating charter schools.

School name	address	students	grades	2007 API	notes
Garfield Elementary	13050 Aurora Drive; San Leandro 94577-3159	389	K–5	704	
James Madison Elementary	14751 Juniper Street; San Leandro 94579-1222	373	K–5	725	
Jefferson Elementary	14300 Bancroft Avenue; San Leandro 94578-1727	496	K–5	807	
McKinley Elementary	2150 East 14th Street; San Leandro 94577-6025	497	K–5	719	
Monroe Elementary	3750 Monterey Blvd. San Leandro 94578-4116	430	K–5	765	
Roosevelt Elementary	951 Dowling Blvd. San Leandro 94577-2125	513	K–5	730	
Washington Elementary	250 Dutton Avenue; San Leandro 94577-2804	357	K–5	729	
Halkin Elementary	1300 Williams Street; San Leandro 94577-2401	820	K–5	734	
Bancroft Middle	1150 Bancroft Avenue; San Leandro 94577-3863	1006	6–8	671	Principal: Valentin Del Rio; Notable alumni Jarrad Page, NFL player; Notable staff: teacher and coach Jim Sorensen, Masters track world record holder; Mascot: Broncos; Website: www.bancroftbroncos.net
John Muir Middle	1444 Williams Street; San Leandro 94577-2403	1150	6–8	708	Principal: Elisa Alvarez; Mascot: Peregrine falcon; website www.johnmuirsl.org 37°42′57.43″N 122°9′50.09″W
Lincoln High (Continuation)	1700 Leonard Dr; San Leandro 94579-1222	76	10-12	510	
San Leandro High	2200 Bancroft Avenue; San Leandro 94577	2617	9–12	685	
Pacific High School (closed)	1201 Marina Blvd. San Leandro 94577		9-12		Operated classes of 1962-1986. Mascot: Vikings

Note: school enrollment data is for 2005–06.
