= John George Psychiatric Hospital =

Coordinates: 37.710840°N 122.120214°W

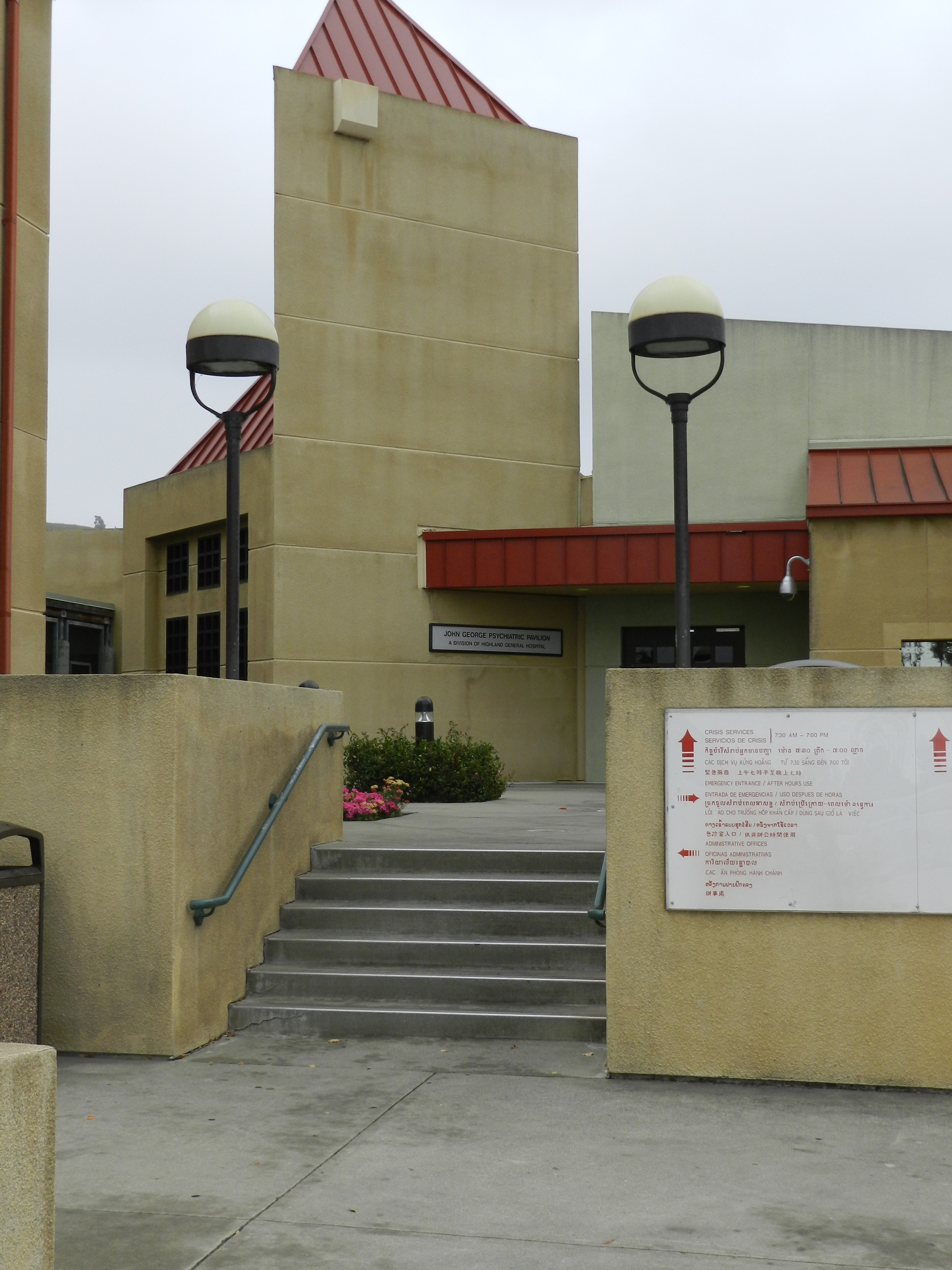
- Nonemergency hospital entrance

Geography
- Location: San Leandro, Alameda County, California, United States

Organization
- Type: Psychiatric hospital

Links
- Website: Official website
- Lists: Hospitals in California

John George Psychiatric Hospital, previously John George Psychiatric Pavilion, also known as John George Psychiatric Emergency Room, John George Hospital or John George, is a psychiatric hospital located in San Leandro, in Alameda County, California. It is operated by the Alameda Health System.

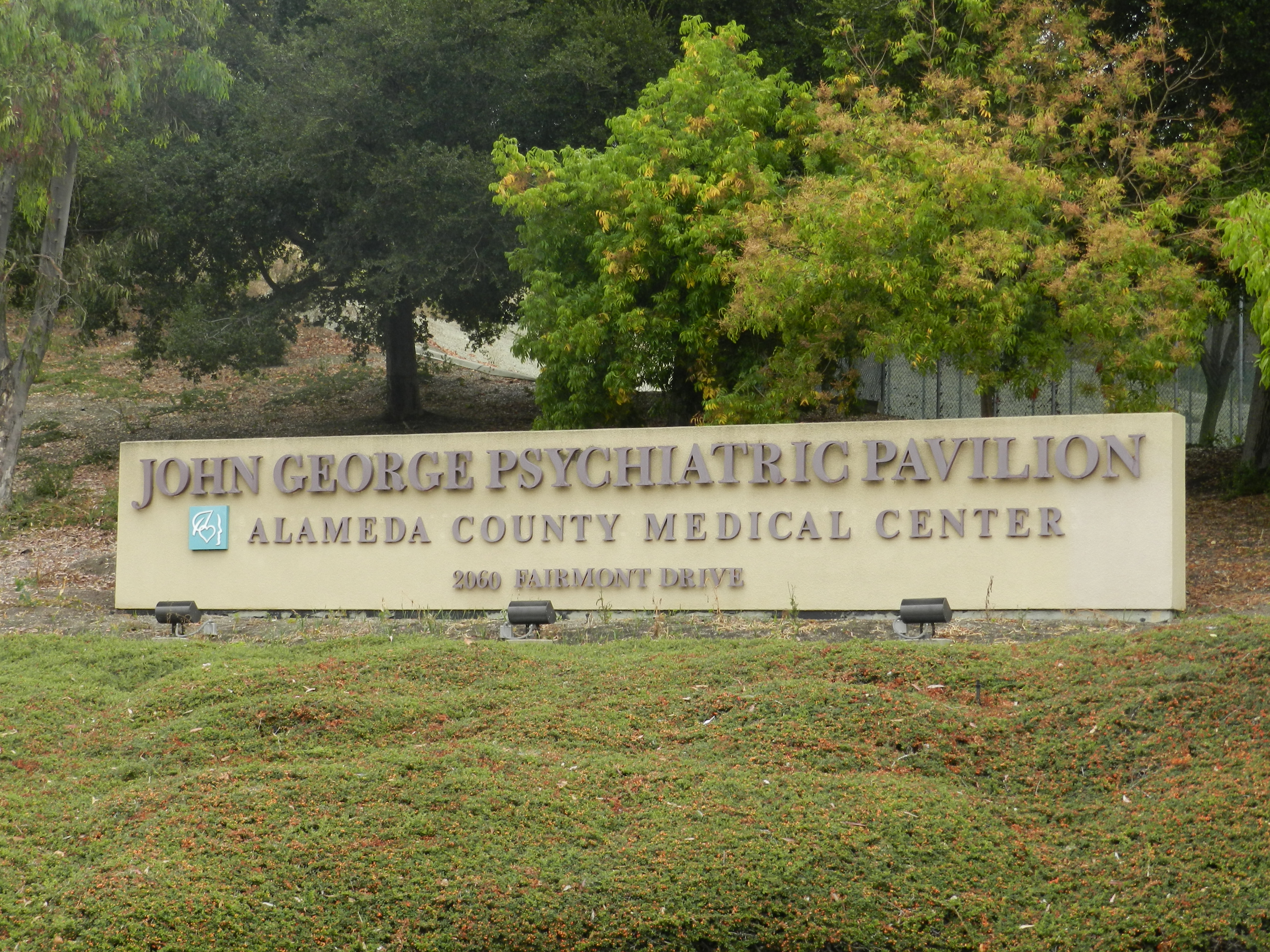
Signage, showing former name

It is located near Fairmont Hospital and the county Juvenile Justice Center. It opened in 1992 and was named after County Supervisor John George to honor his advocacy for mentally ill people. It has an 80-bed capacity.

In November 2003, a doctor at the facility, Erlinda Ursua, died there and a patient, a 38-year-old female was charged with murder. The female patient pled not guilty in 2005. No criminal charges were later filed.

== See also ==
- List of hospitals in California
