= John Tibar George =

Tanzanian footballer

Personal information
- Date of birth: 1 January 2000 (age 26)
- Place of birth: Tanzania
- Height: 1.88 m (6 ft 2 in)
- Position: Midfielder

Youth career
- Ndanda
- –2019: Singida United
- 2019–2020: Vyškov

Senior career*
Years	Team	Apps	(Gls)
2020–2021	Baniyas	12	(2)
2021–2022	Masfout		
2022–2023	Hatta		
- * Club domestic league appearances and goals as of 17:17, 1 February 2020 (UTC)

John Tibar George (born 1 January 2000) is a Tanzanian footballer plays as a midfielder.

== Career statistics ==
=== Club ===
As of 1 February 2020.

Club	Season	League			Cup		Continental		Other		Total	
Club	Season	Division	Apps	Goals	Apps	Goals	Apps	Goals	Apps	Goals	Apps	Goals
Baniyas	2019–20	UAE Pro League	1	0	0	0	0	0	0	0	1	0
Career total			1	0	0	0	0	0	0	0	1	0
