= John George (Royal Navy officer) =

John George (died 24 May 1690) was an officer of the Royal Navy. George served during the Nine Years' War and in the war's American derivation, King William's War. During his service in North America, George commanded the frigate HMS Rose. He first sailed from Britain in the Rose on 20 January 1686, transporting Edmund Randolph. Randolph had been appointed secretary of the Dominion of New England, an entity formed out of a union of England's colonies in the American northeast.

The Rose was stationed near Boston until 1689; it was anchored offshore during the 1689 Boston revolt, an uprising of Massachusetts Puritans against the Dominion and its governor, Sir Edmund Andros. The rebels, whose force consisted of Puritan militia units and a "mob" of Bostonians, succeeded in overthrowing Andros and his council. George came ashore, in the company of the Rose's surgeon and master, to investigate the disturbance; he was confronted by the ship's carpenter and a platoon of Boston militiamen. When informed by the militiamen that he was to be arrested, he asked to see a warrant, whereupon they drew their swords and took him into custody. Eventually released, George sailed to Piscataqua in May 1690; his posting here was in response to Indian attacks against the northern colonists. On 19 May, he sailed north to engage a French warship off Cape Sable Island. The ships met on 24 May, and George was killed during the two-hour action.
