= John George (California politician) =

American politician

John Daniel George

Member of the Alameda County Board of Supervisors from District 5
- In office 1976–1989
- Preceded by: Tom Bates
- Succeeded by: Warren Widener

Personal details
- Born: September 16, 1928
- Died: December 10, 1988 (aged 60)
- Party: Democratic

John Daniel George (September 16, 1928 – December 10, 1988) was a Californian politician and the first African American elected to the Alameda County Board of Supervisors. George served as supervisor for the Alameda County's District 5 for over ten years from December 1976 to January 1989.

A psychiatric hospital administered by Alameda Health System, formerly known as Alameda County Medical Center, John George Psychiatric Pavilion opened in 1992 and was named after George to honor his advocacy for the mentally ill. It has since been rebranded as John George Psychiatric Hospital George had stated "My people [African Americans] were the first laboratory animals in America." In October 1989 a Democratic Party club was formed and also named after George, the John George Democratic Club whose goals are "In his memory and in an effort to keep his voice and vision alive in the Democratic Party."

George is described as the leading proponent of the health care, welfare, and workers' rights of all County citizens, an early activist in the struggle for civil rights and affirmative action and a long-time leader in the local Anti-Apartheid Movement.
