= San Leandro, California =

City in California, United States

- City
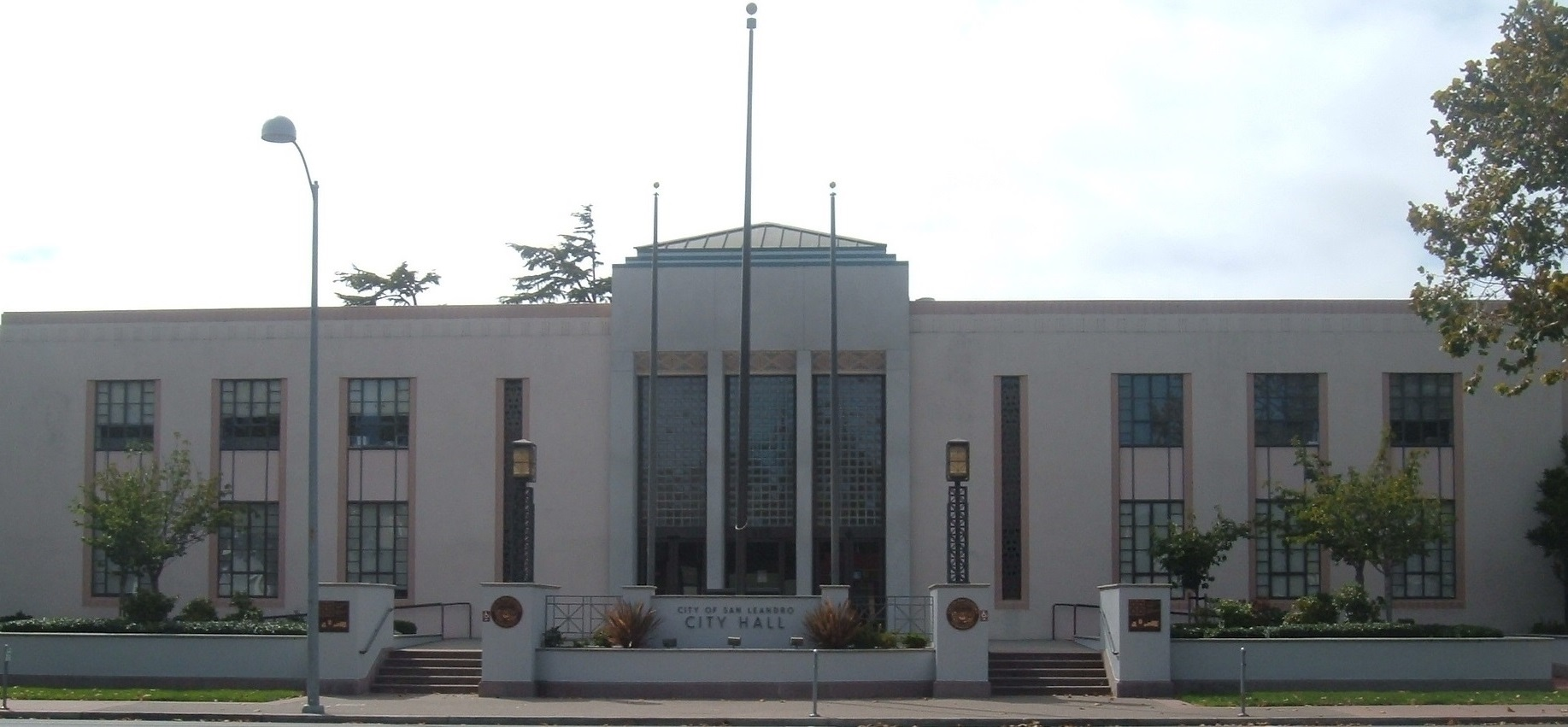
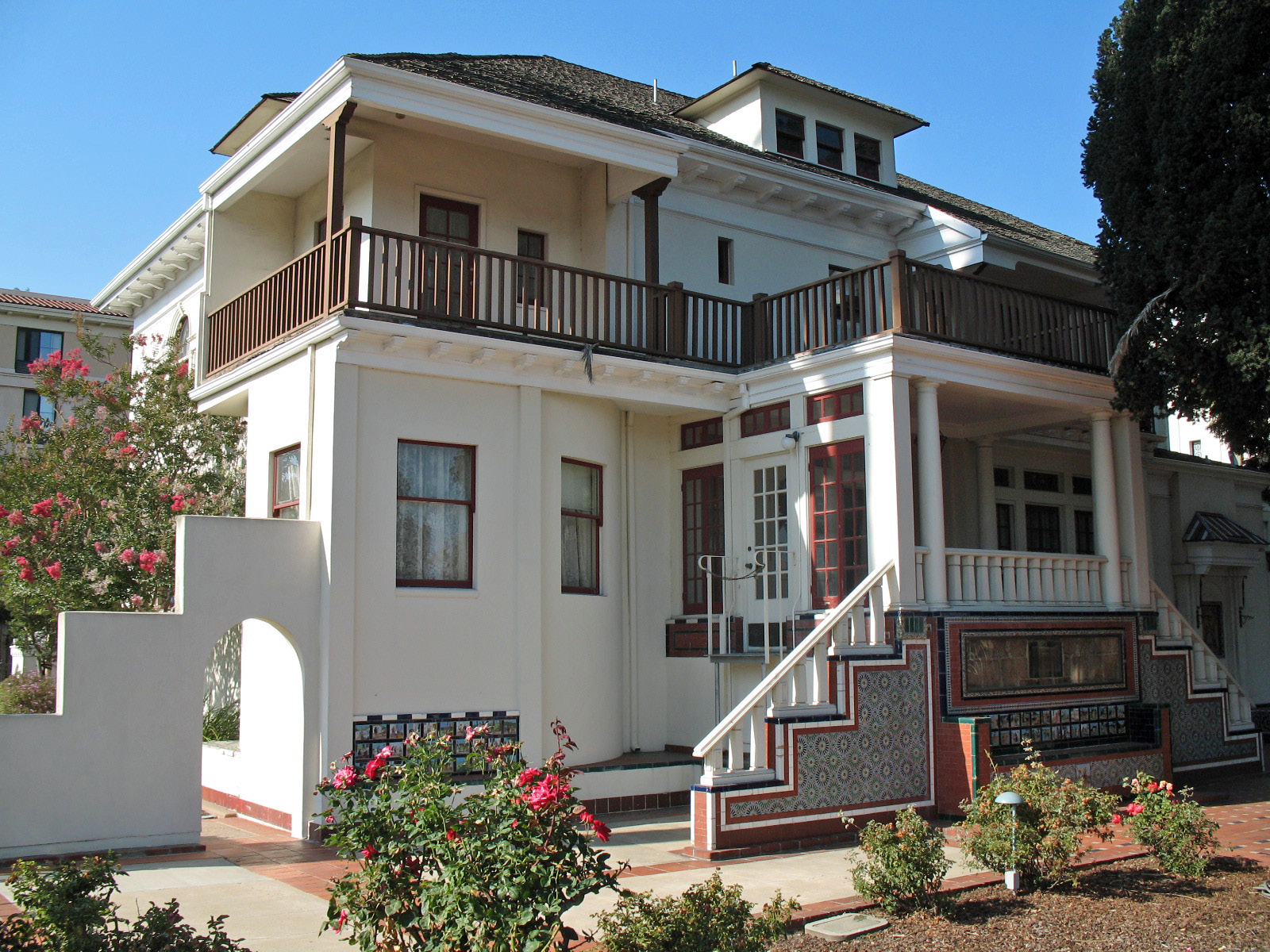
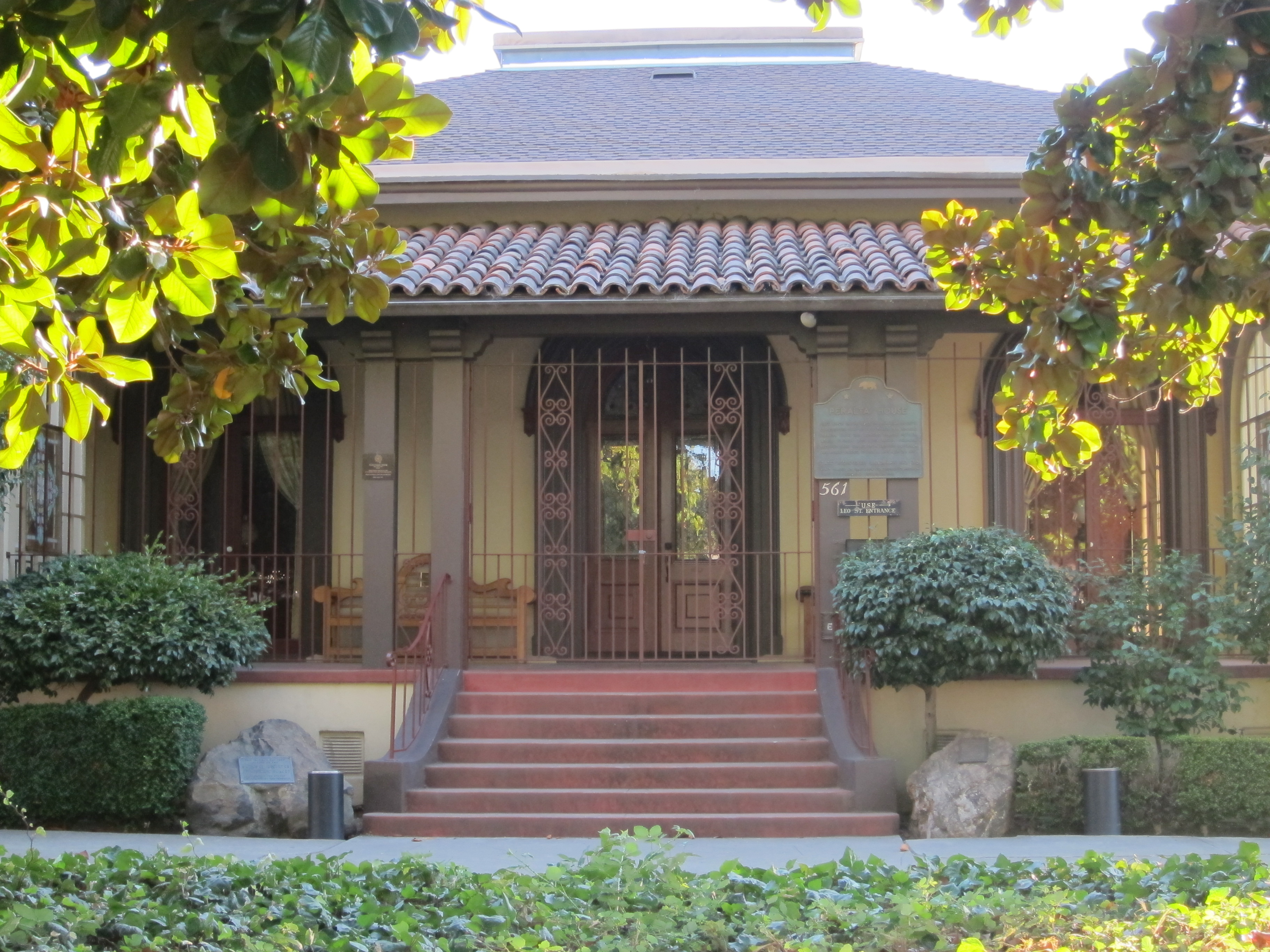
- Clockwise, from top: San Leandro City Hall, Peralta Home, Casa Peralta

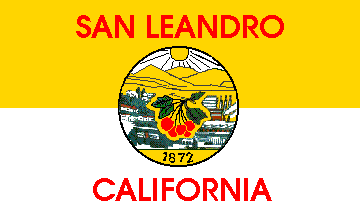
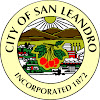
- Flag Seal
- Nickname: SL (Note: As opposed to "SLZ", which is San Lorenzo.)
- Interactive map of San Leandro, California
- Location within the San Francisco Bay Area Location within California Location within the United States
- Coordinates: 37°43′30″N 122°09′22″W
- Country: United States
- State: California
- County: Alameda
- Region: San Francisco Bay Area
- Incorporated: March 21, 1872
- Named for: St. Leander of Seville

Government
  - Type: Council–Manager
  - Mayor: Juan González III
  - Council members by district number: 1. Sbeydeh Viveros-Walton; 2. Bryan Azevedo; 3. Victor Aguilar, Jr.; 4. Fred Simon; 5. Xouhoa Bowen; 6. Dylan Boldt
  - City manager: Janelle Cameron
  - State Legislators (AD-20 & SD-9): Asm. Liz Ortega (D); Sen. Tim Grayson (D)
  - U.S. Representative (CA-12, CA-14): Lateefah Simon (D); Aisha Wahab (D)

Area
  - Total: 15.48 sq mi (40.10 km^{2})
  - Land: 13.32 sq mi (34.51 km^{2})
  - Water: 2.16 sq mi (5.59 km^{2}) 13.94%
- Elevation: 56 ft (17 m)

Population (2020)
  - Total: 91,008
  - Rank: 97th in California
  - Density: 6,830/sq mi (2,637/km^{2})
- Demonym: San Leandran
- Time zone: UTC–8 (Pacific (PST))
  - Summer (DST): UTC–7 (PDT)
- ZIP Codes: 94577–94579
- Area codes: 510, 341
- FIPS code: 06-68084
- GNIS feature IDs: 232427, 1659582, 2411794
- Website: www.sanleandro.org

San Leandro (Spanish for "St. Leander") is a city in Alameda County, California, United States. It is located in the East Bay of the San Francisco Bay Area; between Oakland to the northwest, and Ashland, Castro Valley, and Hayward to the southeast. The population was 91,008 as of the 2020 census.

== History ==
=== Spanish and Mexican eras ===
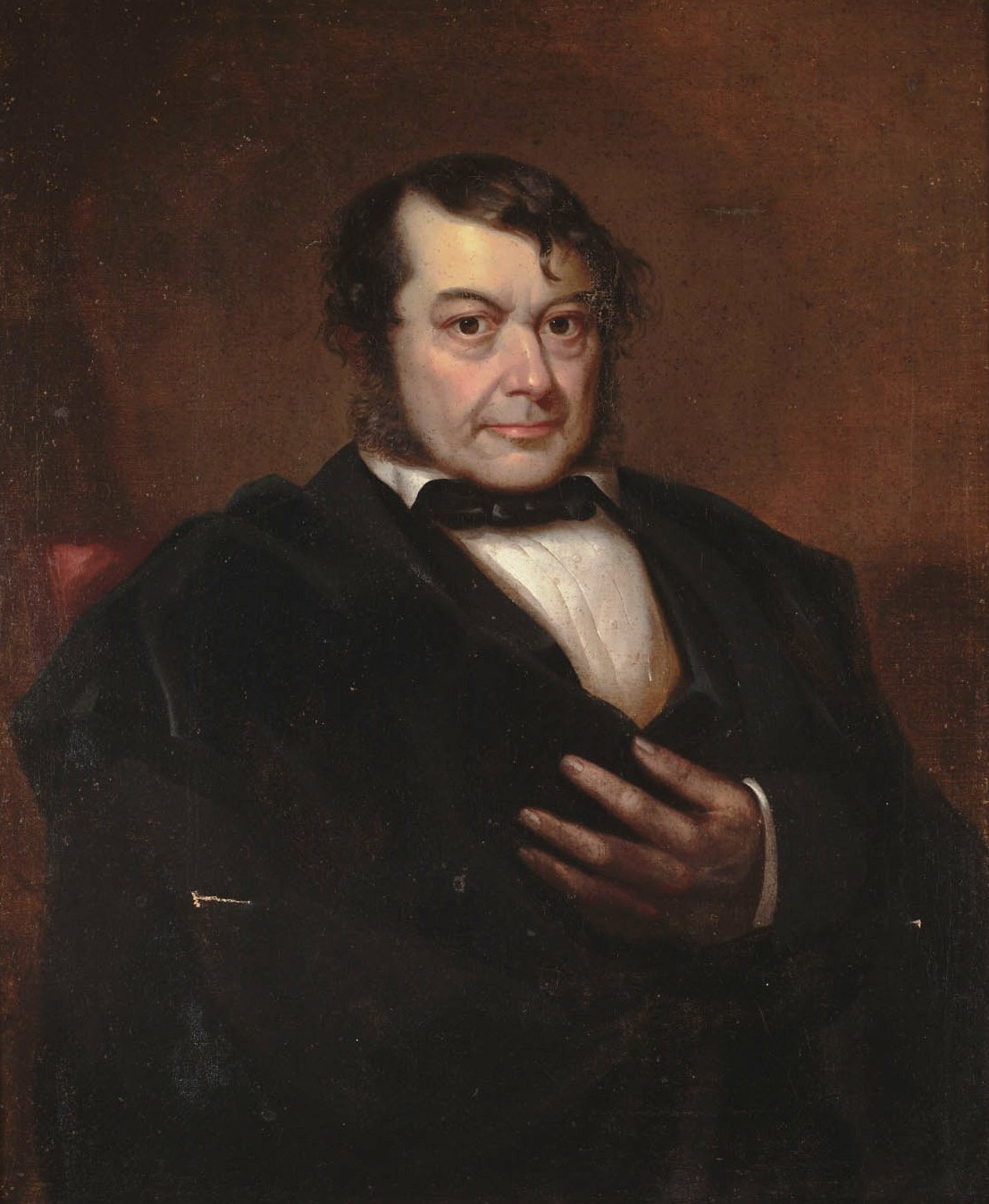
Californio statesman José Joaquín Estudillo, founder of San Leandro

The Spanish settlers called these natives Costeños, or 'coast people,' and the English-speaking settlers called them Costanoans. San Leandro was first visited by Europeans on March 20, 1772, by Spanish soldier Captain Pedro Fages and the Spanish Catholic priest Father Crespi.

San Leandro is located on the Rancho San Leandro and Rancho San Antonio Mexican land grants. Its name refers to Leander of Seville, a sixth-century Spanish bishop. Both land grants were located along El Camino Viejo, modern 14th Street / State Route 185.

The smaller land grant, Rancho San Leandro, of approximately 9,000 acres (3,600 ha), was given to José Joaquín Estudillo in 1842. The larger, Rancho San Antonio, of approximately 44,000 acres (18,000 ha), was given to another Spanish soldier, Don Luis Maria Peralta, in 1820. Beginning in 1855, two of Estudillo's sons-in-law, John B. Ward and William Heath Davis, laid out the townsite that would become San Leandro, bounded by the San Leandro Creek on the north, Watkins Street on the east, Castro Street on the south, and on the west by the longitude lying a block west of Alvarado Street. The city has a historical Portuguese American population dating from the 1880s, when Portuguese laborers from Hawaii or from the Azores began settling in the city and established farms and businesses. By the 1910 census, the Portuguese community accounted for nearly two-thirds of San Leandro's population.

=== American era ===
In 1856, San Leandro became the county seat of Alameda County, but the county courthouse was destroyed there by the devastating 1868 quake on the Hayward Fault. The county seat was then re-established in the town of Brooklyn (now part of Oakland) in 1872.

During the American Civil War, San Leandro and its neighbor, Brooklyn, fielded a California militia company, the Brooklyn Guard.

San Leandro was one of a number of suburban cities built in the post–World War II era of California to have restrictive covenants, which barred property owners in the city from selling properties to African Americans and other minorities. As a result of the covenant, In 1960, the city was almost entirely white (99.3%), while its neighbor city of Oakland had a large African American population. The United States Supreme Court, in Shelley v. Kraemer, later declared such covenants unenforceable by the state. San Leandro was an 86.4% white-non-Hispanic community according in the 1970 census. The city's demographics began to diversify in the 1980s. By 2010, Asian Americans had become a plurality population in San Leandro, with approximately one-third of the population, with non-Hispanic Whites accounting for 27.1% of the population.

== Geography ==
The San Leandro Hills run above the city to the northeast. In the lower elevations of the city, an upper regionally contained aquifer is located 50 to 100 feet (15 to 30 m) below the surface. At least one deeper aquifer exists approximately 250 feet (75 m) below the surface. Some salt water intrusion has taken place in the San Leandro Cone. Shallow groundwater generally flows to the west, from the foothills toward San Francisco Bay. Shallow groundwater is contaminated in many of the locales of the lower elevation of the city. Contamination by gasoline, volatile organic compounds and some heavy metals has been recorded in a number of these lower-elevation areas.

The trace of the Hayward Fault passes under Foothill Boulevard in San Leandro. Follow the link in the reference to see a series of photos of the fault cutting the asphalt between 1979 and 1987.

== Demographics ==
Historical population
Census	Pop.	Note	%±
1870	426		—
1880	1,369		221.4%
1900	2,253		—
1910	3,471		54.1%
1920	5,703		64.3%
1930	11,455		100.9%
1940	14,601		27.5%
1950	27,542		88.6%
1960	65,962		139.5%
1970	68,698		4.1%
1980	63,952		−6.9%
1990	68,223		6.7%
2000	79,452		16.5%
2010	84,950		6.9%
2020	91,008		7.1%
2025 (est.)	85,353		−6.2%
U.S. Decennial Census; 1860–1870 1880-1890; 1900 1910 1920; 1930 1940 1950; 1960 1970 1980; 1990 2000 2010; 2020

=== Racial and ethnic composition ===
San Leandro, California – Racial and ethnic composition Note: the US Census treats Hispanic/Latino as an ethnic category. This table excludes Latinos from the racial categories and assigns them to a separate category. Hispanics/Latinos may be of any race.
Race / ethnicity (NH = Non-Hispanic)	Pop 2000	Pop 2010	Pop 2020	% 2000	% 2010	% 2020
White alone (NH)	33,646	23,006	17,865	42.35%	27.08%	19.63%
Black or African American alone (NH)	7,622	10,052	9,708	9.59%	11.83%	10.67%
Native American or Alaska Native alone (NH)	360	246	224	0.45%	0.29%	0.25%
Asian alone (NH)	18,064	24,924	32,365	22.74%	29.34%	35.56%
Pacific Islander alone (NH)	627	596	712	0.79%	0.70%	0.78%
Some other race alone (NH)	175	198	440	0.22%	0.23%	0.48%
Mixed-race or multi-racial (NH)	3,019	2,691	3,713	3.80%	3.17%	4.08%
Hispanic or Latino (any race)	15,939	23,237	25,981	20.06%	27.35%	28.55%
Total	79,452	84,950	91,008	100.00%	100.00%	100.00%

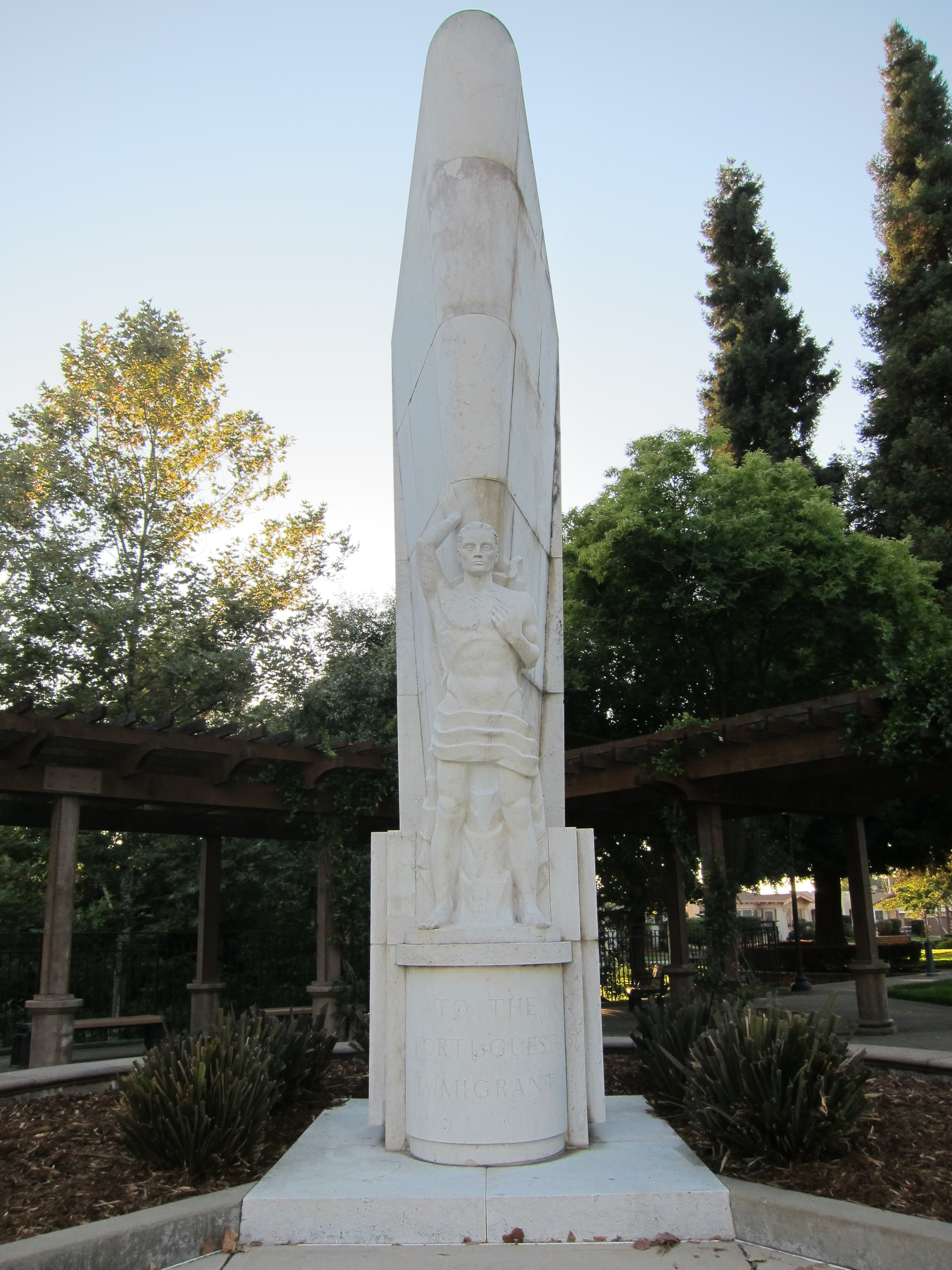
Monument to the Portuguese Immigrant in Root Park

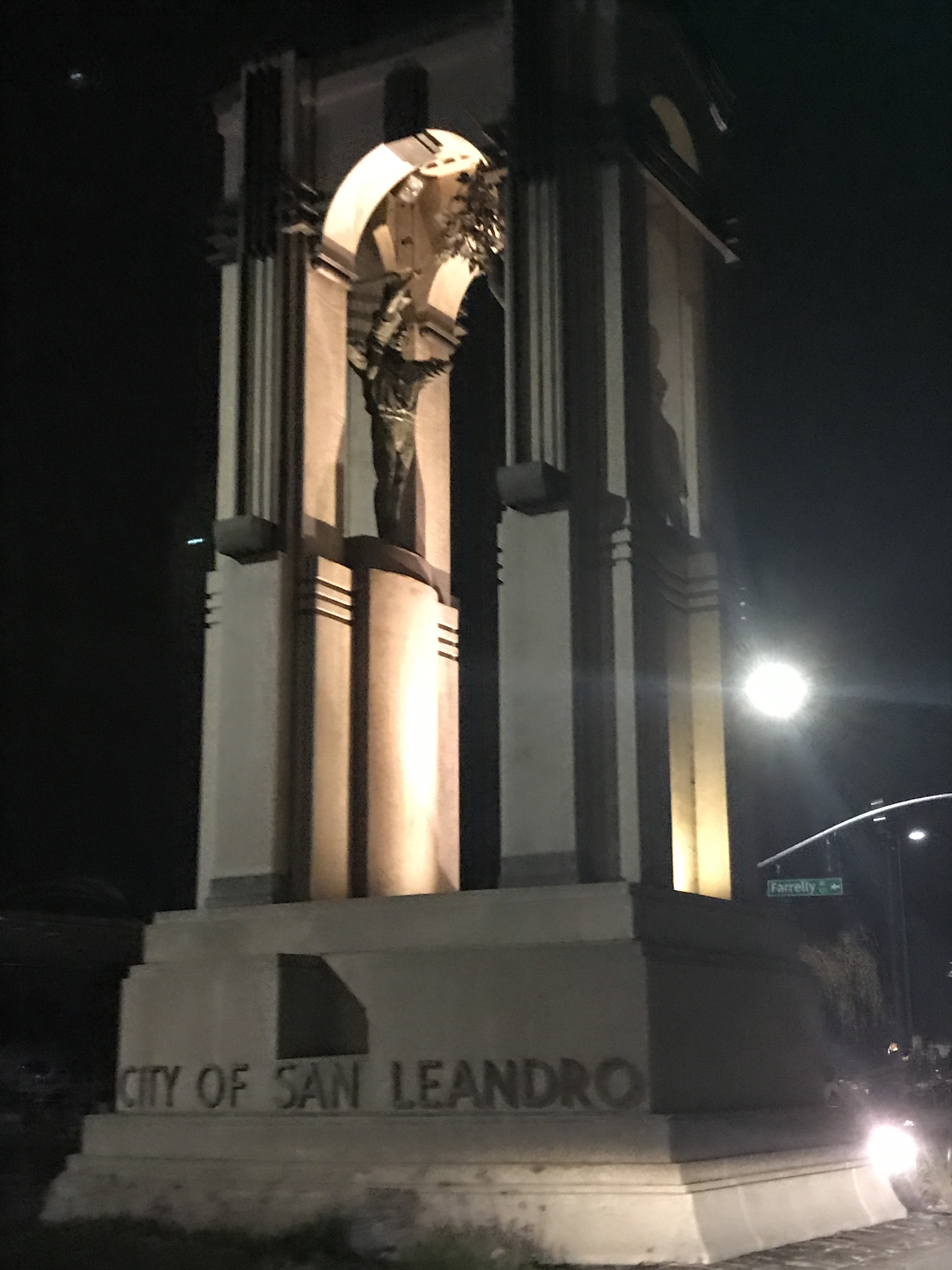
City of San Leandro

=== 2020 census ===
As of the 2020 census, San Leandro had a population of 91,008 and a population density of 6,830.9 inhabitants per square mile (2,637.4/km^{2}). The age distribution was 19.0% under the age of 18, 8.2% aged 18 to 24, 28.2% aged 25 to 44, 27.7% aged 45 to 64, and 16.9% who were 65 years of age or older. The median age was 40.7 years. For every 100 females, there were 93.0 males, and for every 100 females age 18 and over, there were 90.8 males.

The census reported that 98.9% of the population lived in households, 0.7% lived in non-institutionalized group quarters, and 0.4% were institutionalized. 100.0% of residents lived in urban areas, while 0.0% lived in rural areas.

There were 31,799 households, out of which 31.4% included children under the age of 18, 46.4% were married-couple households, 6.5% were cohabiting couple households, 29.3% had a female householder with no partner present, and 17.8% had a male householder with no partner present. 24.0% of households were one person, and 10.4% were one person aged 65 or older. The average household size was 2.83. There were 21,915 families (68.9% of all households).

There were 32,898 housing units at an average density of 2,469.3 units per square mile (953.4 units/km^{2}), of which 31,799 (96.7%) were occupied. Of occupied units, 54.5% were owner-occupied and 45.5% were occupied by renters. Of all units, 3.3% were vacant. The homeowner vacancy rate was 0.5%, and the rental vacancy rate was 3.3%.

=== 2023 ACS estimates ===
In 2023, the US Census Bureau estimated that 37.8% of the population were foreign-born. Of all people aged 5 or older, 46.3% spoke only English at home, 20.5% spoke Spanish, 3.2% spoke other Indo-European languages, 28.0% spoke Asian or Pacific Islander languages, and 2.0% spoke other languages. Of those aged 25 or older, 83.7% were high school graduates and 33.7% had a bachelor's degree.

The median household income in 2023 was $98,063, and the per capita income was $46,387. About 4.9% of families and 8.6% of the population were below the poverty line.

=== 2010 census ===
The 2010 United States census reported that San Leandro had a population of 84,950. The population density was 5,423.8 inhabitants per square mile (2,094.1/km^{2}). The racial makeup of San Leandro was 31,946 (37.6%) White, 10,437 (12.3%) African American, 669 (0.8%) Native American, 25,206 (29.7%) Asian, 642 (0.8%) Pacific Islander, 11,295 (13.3%) from other races, and 4,755 (5.6%) from two or more races. Hispanic or Latino people of any race were 23,237 persons (27.4%). Non-Hispanic Whites numbered 20,004 (23.5%).

The Census reported that 84,300 people (99.2% of the population) lived in households, 282 (0.3%) lived in non-institutionalized group quarters, and 368 (0.4%) were institutionalized.

There were 30,717 households, out of which 10,503 (34.2%) had children under the age of 18 living in them, 14,142 (46.0%) were married couples, 4,509 (14.7%) had a female householder with no husband present, 1,863 (6.1%) had a male householder with no wife present. There were 1,706 (5.6%) unmarried couples, and 326 (1.1%) same-sex couples. 8,228 households (26.8%) were made up of individuals, and 3,128 (10.2%) had someone living alone who was 65 years of age or older. The average household size was 2.74. There were 20,514 families (66.8% of all households); the average family size was 3.36.

The population was spread out, with 18,975 people (22.3%) under the age of 18, 7,044 people (8.3%) aged 18 to 24, 23,469 people (27.6%) aged 25 to 44, 23,779 people (28.0%) aged 45 to 64, and 11,683 people (13.8%) who were 65 years of age or older. The median age was 39.3 years. For every 100 females, there were 92.3 males. For every 100 females age 18 and over, there were 89.5 males.

There were 32,419 housing units at an average density of 2,069.9 per square mile (799.2/km^{2}), of which 30,717 were occupied, of which 17,667 (57.5%) were owner-occupied, and 13,050 (42.5%) were occupied by renters. The homeowner vacancy rate was 1.4%; the rental vacancy rate was 5.8%. 50,669 people (59.6% of the population) lived in owner-occupied housing units and 33,631 people (39.6%) lived in rental housing units.

== Economy ==
San Leandro has long been home to many food-processing operations, and is home to many corporate businesses, such as Ghirardelli, OSIsoft, 21st Amendment Brewery, and a Coca-Cola plant. Maxwell House operated a coffee roasting plant, where the Yuban brand was produced from 1949 until 2015, when it was closed as part of a cost-cutting plan instituted by parent company Kraft Foods. The city has five major shopping centers: the Bayfair Center, Westgate Center, Greenhouse Shopping Center, Marina Square Center, and Pelton Plaza. Lucky's flagship store opened in San Leandro.

Under San Leandro Mayor Stephen H. Cassidy, the city set the goal in 2012 of "becoming a new center of innovation in the San Francisco Bay Area." San Leandro came "out of the downturn like few places around, attracting tech startups, artists and brewers to a onetime traditional industrial hub."

In January 2011, Cassidy and Dr. J. Patrick Kennedy, a San Leandro resident and the president and founder of OSIsoft, one of the city's largest employers, "began developing the public-private partnership that would become Lit San Leandro," a high speed, fiber optic broadband network. In October 2011, the city approved the license agreement that allowed the installation of the fiber-optic cables in the existing conduits under San Leandro streets. In 2012, San Leandro was awarded a $2.1 million grant from the U.S. Economic Development Administration to add 7.5 miles to the network. By 2014, the network expansion was completed, bringing the total length of fiber in the city to over 18 miles. The network is capable of transmitting at up to 10 Gbit/s and is currently only available to business users.

The Zero Net Energy Center, which opened in 2013, is a 46,000-square-foot (4,300 m^{2}) electrician training facility created by the International Brotherhood of Electrical Workers Local 595 and the Northern California chapter of the National Electrical Contractors Association. Training includes energy-efficient construction methods, while the facility itself operates as a zero-energy building.

According to the San Leandro's 2015 Comprehensive Annual Financial Report, the top employers in the city are:

#	Employer	# of employees
1	San Leandro Unified School District	1,380
2	Kaiser Permanente Medical Group	1,032
3	City of San Leandro	582
4	Ghirardelli Chocolate Company	487
5	San Leandro Hospital	460
6	OSIsoft LLC	364
7	Costco Wholesale	358
8	BCI Coca-Cola Bottling Co.	325
9	Wal-Mart Store 2648	323
10	Paramedics Plus LLC	295

== Parks and recreation ==
The San Leandro Marina, which contains group picnic areas and trails, as well as docking facilities, is part of the San Leandro Shoreline Recreation Area.

The City of San Leandro also maintains and services 16 other parks throughout the city, all of which are available for use by residents and visitors. The Department of Recreation and Parks for the City of San Leandro also staffs and maintains the Marina Community Center, the San Leandro Senior Community Center and the San Leandro Family Aquatic Center. Adjacent Lake Chabot Regional Park is popular for its scenic hiking trails, camping, and fishing. Although located in Castro Valley, the Fairmont Ridge Staging Area is the location of the Children's Memorial Grove, which consists of an oak grove and a stone circle, with annual plaques listing the names of children who have died as a result of violence in Alameda County.

== Government ==
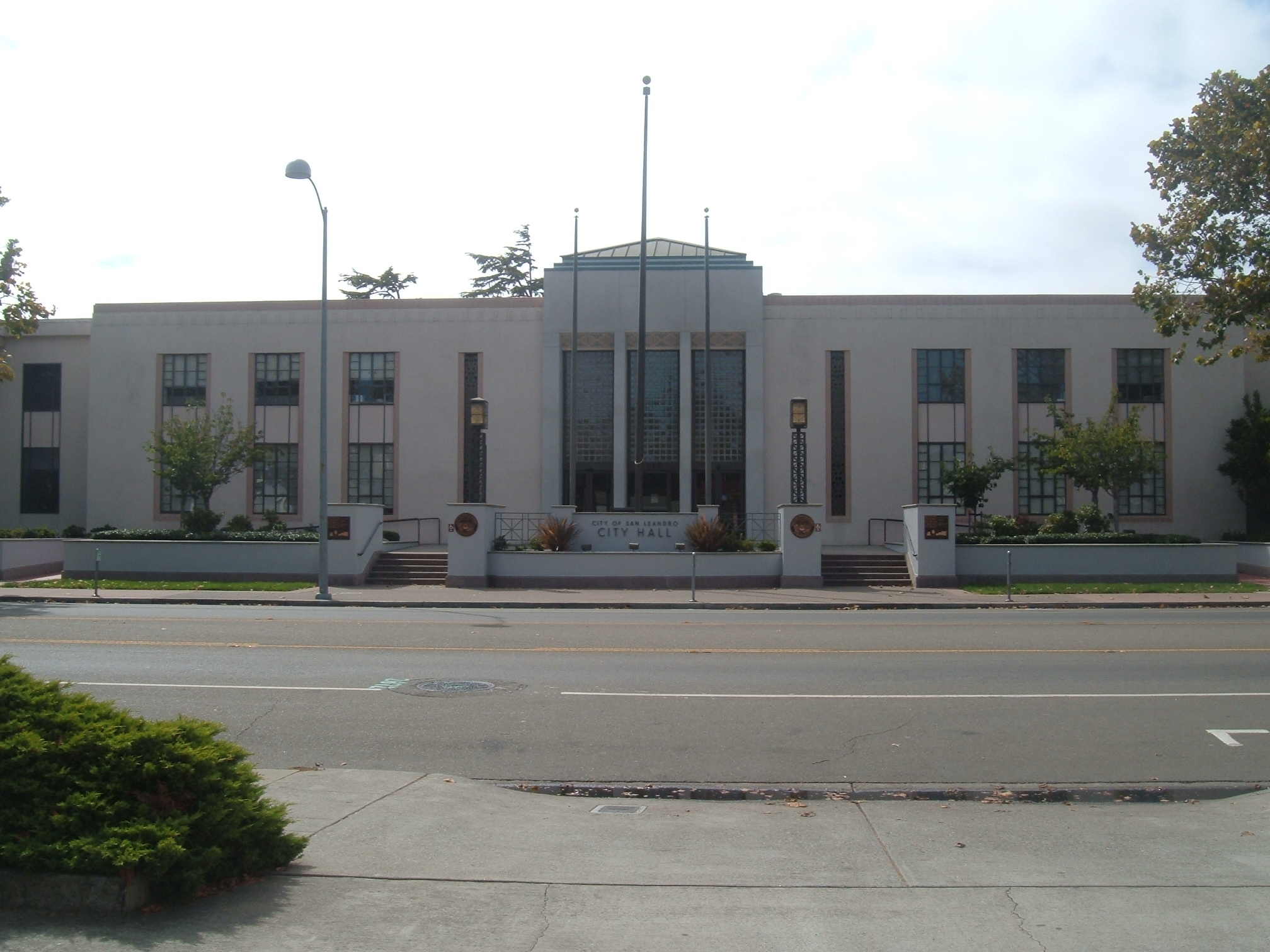
City Hall

San Leandro is a charter city with a mayor-council-manager form of government. The City Manager is Janelle Cameron. San Leandro city hall was built in 1939.

Mayor Juan González III was elected in November 2022, and serves on the city council with six council members. Council members are elected by all voters in the city using instant-runoff voting. They must reside within the district they represent.

=== Politics ===
In 2017, San Leandro had 45,257 registered voters, with 26,421 (58.4%) registered as Democrats, 5,271 (11.6%) registered as Republicans, and 11,723 (25.9%) decline to state voters.

== Education ==
San Leandro is home to two school districts: The San Lorenzo Unified School District includes parts of Washington Manor and the San Leandro Unified School District includes most of San Leandro, plus a small part of Oakland.

A number of students residing in San Leandro attend San Lorenzo Unified School District schools, mostly in the Washington Manor neighborhood, including Arroyo High School, Dayton Elementary School, Washington Manor Middle School and Corvallis Elementary School, due to proximity to the San Leandro/San Lorenzo border.

The rest of San Leandro is served by the San Leandro Unified School District.

== Infrastructure ==
=== Transportation ===
San Leandro is served by the Interstate 880, 580 and 238 freeways connecting to other parts of the Bay Area. East 14th Street (SR-185) is a major thoroughfare in downtown and continues towards East Oakland and Hayward. Davis Street is also another major street that intersects East 14th Street in downtown before heading towards the San Francisco Bay. Public transportation is provided by the Bay Area Rapid Transit BART District with the San Leandro and Bayfair stations serving the city. San Leandro LINKS provides free bus shuttle service for the western part of the city to the San Leandro BART station and AC Transit is the local bus provider for the city. A senior-oriented local bus service, Flex Shuttle, also operates within the city, as does East Bay Paratransit, which provides shuttle type transportation to residents with disabilities.

=== Healthcare ===
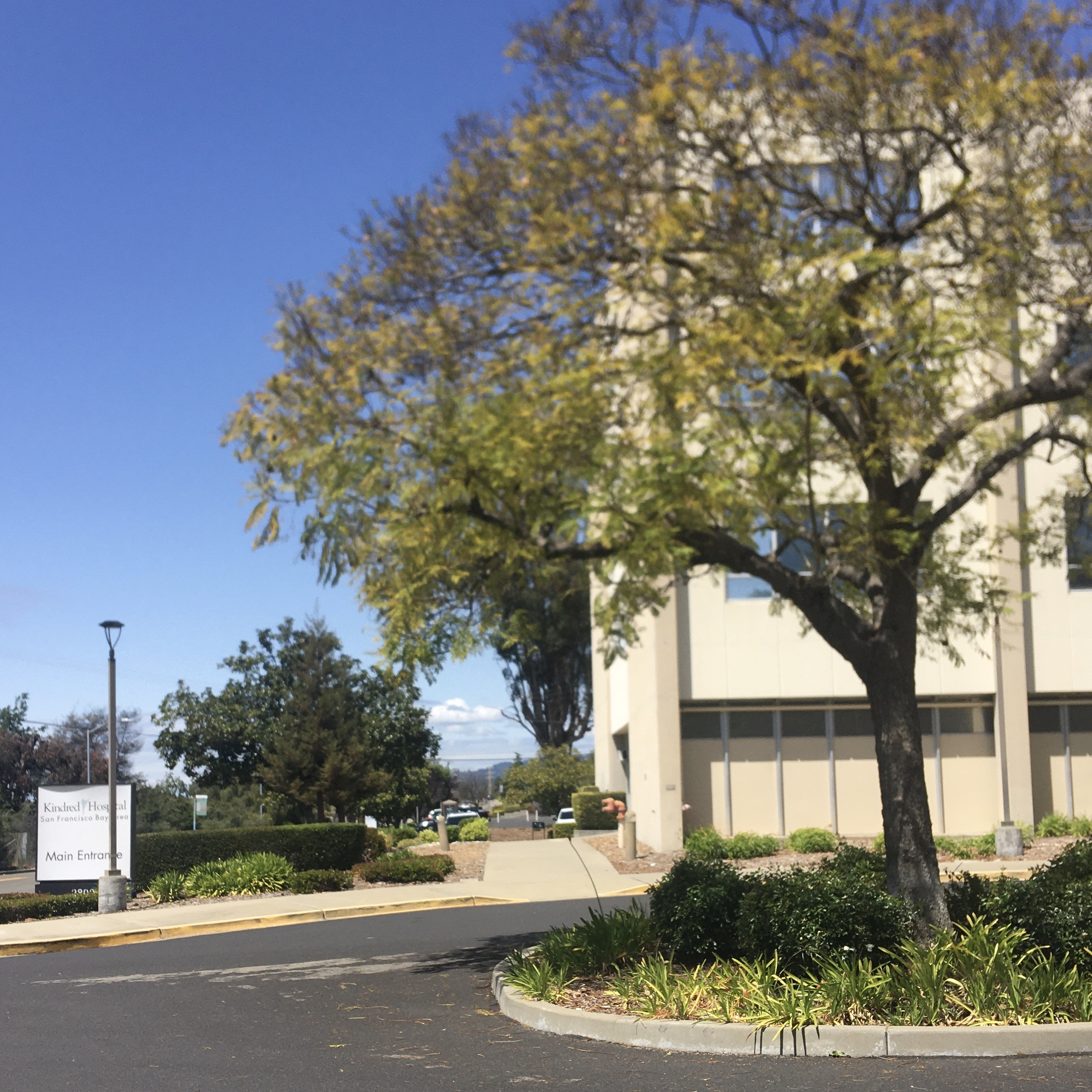
Kindred Hospital on Benedict Dr.

The Alameda County Medical Center's psychiatric hospital, the John George Psychiatric Pavilion, is located nearby in San Leandro. Fairmont Hospital, also located close by, is an acute rehabilitation, neuro-respiratoy and HIV care center. San Leandro Hospital is the city's full service hospital.

Also present within the city are Kindred Hospital – San Francisco Bay Area, a long-term acute care facility, and the sub-acute unit of the nursing home care facility, Providence Group, Inc's All Saint's Subacute. A Kaiser Permanente Medical Center opened in June 2014, providing emergency medical services.

== Notable people ==
- Stuart Alexander, sausage maker and mass murderer
- Joe Alves, film production designer, worked on three of Jaws films, born in San Leandro
- Richard Aoki, activist, charter member of Black Panther Party, born in San Leandro in 1938
- C.L. Best, co-founder of Caterpillar, Inc.
- Daniel Best, manufacturer and pioneer in the development of farming equipment
- Lloyd Bridges, actor, film and television star, born in San Leandro on January 15, 1913
- Brian Copeland, comedian, writer, moved to San Leandro in 1972; author of Not a Genuine Black Man, about growing up black in then all-white San Leandro
- Ellen Corbett, state senator (later moved to Hayward, California)
- Dennis Dixon, quarterback for University of Oregon and NFL's Philadelphia Eagles; attended San Leandro High School
- Carl Friden, Swedish American who started business Friden, Inc. in San Leandro in 1934
- Kathy Garver, actress, best known for TV series Family Affair, was raised in San Leandro, where she attended school
- Curtis Goodwin, Major League Baseball player from 1995 to 1999; graduated from San Leandro High School
- Chuck Hayes, NBA basketball player for Houston Rockets, born in San Leandro on June 11, 1983; former college basketball star for Kentucky Wildcats
- Leonard Haze, professional drummer and co-founding member of rock and roll band Y&T, was a longtime San Leandro resident and San Leandro High School graduate
- Pat Hurst, professional golfer and NCAA women's champion, born in San Leandro on May 23, 1969
- Derrick Jasper, college basketball player for UNLV Runnin' Rebels and Kentucky Wildcats; born in San Leandro on April 13, 1988
- Fred Korematsu, see Korematsu v. United States, resident of, and arrested in, San Leandro
- Art Larsen, professional tennis player, graduated from San Leandro High School, top-ranked in U.S. in 1950; lived in San Leandro until his death on December 7, 2012
- Tony Lema, professional golfer, moved to San Leandro in 1940 at age six; in June 1983, Tony Lema Golf Course was dedicated in San Leandro
- Bill Lockyer, former state treasurer and attorney general of California; served as president pro tempore of the California State Senate; graduated from San Leandro High School and served on the San Leandro School Board from 1968 to 1973
- Todd Marinovich, former quarterback for USC and NFL's Oakland Raiders, born in San Leandro in 1969
- Dave McCloughan, NFL defensive back; born in San Leandro on November 20, 1966
- Andrew McGuire, consumer advocate, led 30-year campaign to mandate fire-safe cigarettes worldwide, MacArthur Fellow, attended Pacific High class of 1963, John Muir Junior High, Monroe and Cleveland Elementary Schools
- Russell Means, an Oglala Sioux activist for rights of Native American people, whose family moved to San Leandro in 1942; he graduated from San Leandro High School in 1958
- Russ Meyer, film director, born in San Leandro on March 21, 1922
- Natali Morris, technology news journalist and online media personality, born in San Leandro
- Arlen Ness, custom motorcycle designer
- Greg Norton, Major League Baseball player, hitting coach for Auburn University; born in San Leandro on July 6, 1972
- Jarrad Page, starting safety for Kansas City Chiefs; lettered three years at San Leandro High School, Class of 2002.
- Harold Peary, actor, comedian and singer in radio, film, television and animation; born in San Leandro
- Tony Robello, Major League Baseball second baseman for Cincinnati Reds; born in San Leandro in 1914
- Katherine Sarafian, PIXAR producer
- David Silveria, musician (drummer for Korn), born in San Leandro on September 21, 1972
- Jim Sorensen, track and field athlete, primarily middle-distance races; Masters M40 world record holder at 800 meters and former Masters M40 world record holder at 1500
- Amen Thompson, basketball player for the Houston Rockets of the National Basketball Association; was raised in San Leandro until he moved to Florida
- Dorothy Warenskjold, lyric soprano, born in San Leandro in 1921
- Harry Yoon, film editor, lived in San Leandro and graduated from San Leandro High School in 1989

== Sister cities ==
San Leandro is twinned with the following cities:

- Naga, Philippines, since 1989
- Calabanga, Camarines Sur, Philippines, since 2007
- Ponta Delgada, Azores, Portugal, since 1970
- Ribeirão Preto, Brazil, since 1962

Friendship city

- Yangchun, China, since 2007

== See also ==
- List of sundown towns in the United States
- Casa de Estudillo, the final home of José Joaquín Estudillo, since 1938 a California Historical Landmark
