= Interstate 405 (California) =

Interstate Highway in California

Interstate 405
- San Diego Freeway
- I-405 highlighted in red

Route information
- Auxiliary route of I-5
- Maintained by Caltrans
- Length: 72.15 mi (116.11 km)
- Existed: 1964–present
- NHS: Entire route

Major junctions
- South end: I-5 in Irvine
- SR 133 in Irvine; SR 55 in Costa Mesa; SR 73 in Costa Mesa; I-605 / SR 22 in Seal Beach; I-710 in Long Beach; I-110 in Carson; I-105 near LAX; I-10 in West Los Angeles; US 101 in Sherman Oaks; SR 118 in Mission Hills
- North end: I-5 in Sylmar

Location
- Country: United States
- State: California
- Counties: Orange, Los Angeles

Highway system
- Interstate Highway System; Main; Auxiliary; Suffixed; Business; Future; State highways in California; Interstate; US; State; Scenic; History; Pre‑1964; Unconstructed; Deleted; Freeways
← US 399	→ US 466

Interstate 405 (I-405) is a major north–south auxiliary Interstate Highway in Southern California. The entire route is known as the northern segment of the San Diego Freeway. It is also known colloquially as "the 405" to Southern California residents. I-405 is a bypass auxiliary route of I-5, running along the southern and western parts of the Greater Los Angeles urban area from Irvine in the south to Sylmar in the north.

I-405, heavily traveled by both commuters and freight haulers along its entire length, is the third busiest freeway in the United States as measured by annual average daily traffic. It has played a crucial role in the development of dozens of cities and suburbs along its route through Los Angeles and Orange counties. It also serves Los Angeles International Airport, Long Beach Airport, and Orange County's John Wayne Airport.

== Route description ==
The entirety of I-405 is defined in section 615 of the California Streets and Highways Code as Route 405, and that the highway is from "Route 5 near El Toro to Route 5 near San Fernando". This definition corresponds with the Federal Highway Administration (FHWA)'s route logs of I-405.

I-405 is part of the California Freeway and Expressway System and is part of the National Highway System, a network of highways that are considered essential to the country's economy, defense, and mobility by the Federal Highway Administration. The entire freeway is known as the San Diego Freeway, and parts of it are less commonly known as the Sepulveda Freeway (after Sepulveda Boulevard). In 2024, the California State Legislature passed Assembly Bill 2698, adding subdivision (b) to section 615 of the California Streets and Highways Code that designates the segment from Bolsa Chica Road to Bolsa Avenue near the Little Saigon district in Orange County as the Little Saigon Freeway, in recognition of it being the oldest and largest Little Saigon enclave in the country.

=== Orange County ===
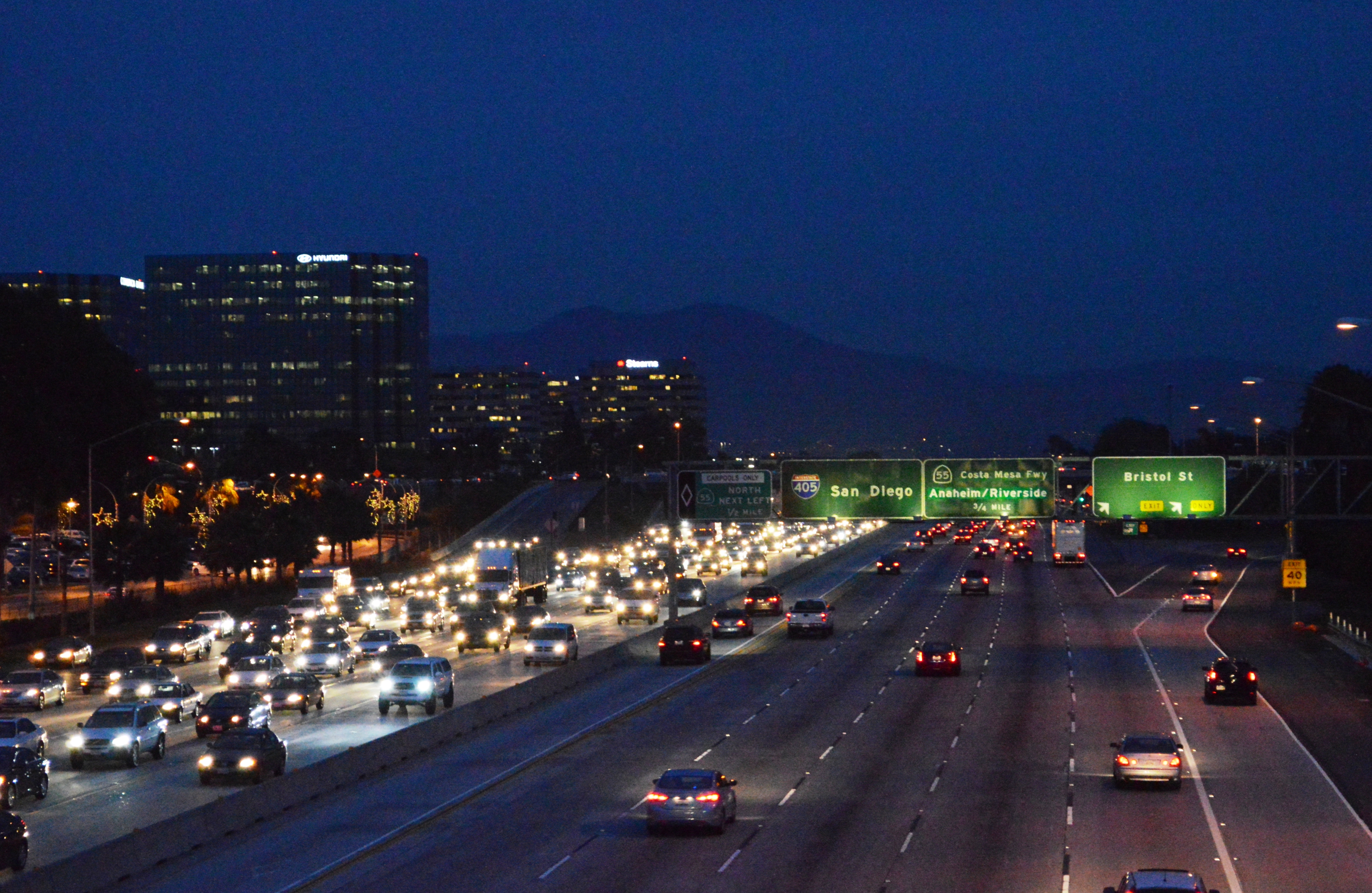
The Bristol exit near South Coast Plaza and the Segerstrom Center for the Arts, with Saddleback in the background

I-405 begins at the El Toro Y interchange in southeastern Irvine in Orange County, splitting from its parent I-5 and inheriting that route's San Diego Freeway title; I-5 continues north as the Santa Ana Freeway. The freeway passes immediately south of the Irvine Spectrum Center mall before intersecting with State Route 133 (SR 133). It then continues through Irvine, passing north of the University of California, Irvine, and then along the northern boundary of John Wayne Airport. After passing the airport, the freeway enters Costa Mesa and has an interchange with SR 55. It passes South Coast Plaza before a partial interchange with SR 73, which serves as a partially-tolled bypass of I-405 between Costa Mesa and Laguna Niguel.

The freeway then travels through Fountain Valley and along the edges of Westminster and Huntington Beach before entering Seal Beach, where it begins to run concurrently with SR 22. It continues along the northern edge of Seal Beach, passing between Naval Weapons Station Seal Beach and Joint Forces Training Base - Los Alamitos, before SR 22 splits from I-405 and continues west while the freeway turns north. I-405 then intersects the southern end of I-605 before crossing the San Gabriel River and entering Los Angeles County.

=== Los Angeles County ===
I-405 enters Los Angeles County in the city of Long Beach. It passes to the north of California State University, Long Beach, and then along the south of Long Beach Airport. The freeway then intersects with I-710 before entering Carson (and crossing through a small sliver of the city of Los Angeles before reentering Carson). It passes near California State University, Dominguez Hills, and Dignity Health Sports Park, home of Major League Soccer club LA Galaxy. A weigh station for both directions is located in Carson between the Avalon Boulevard and Main Street exits.

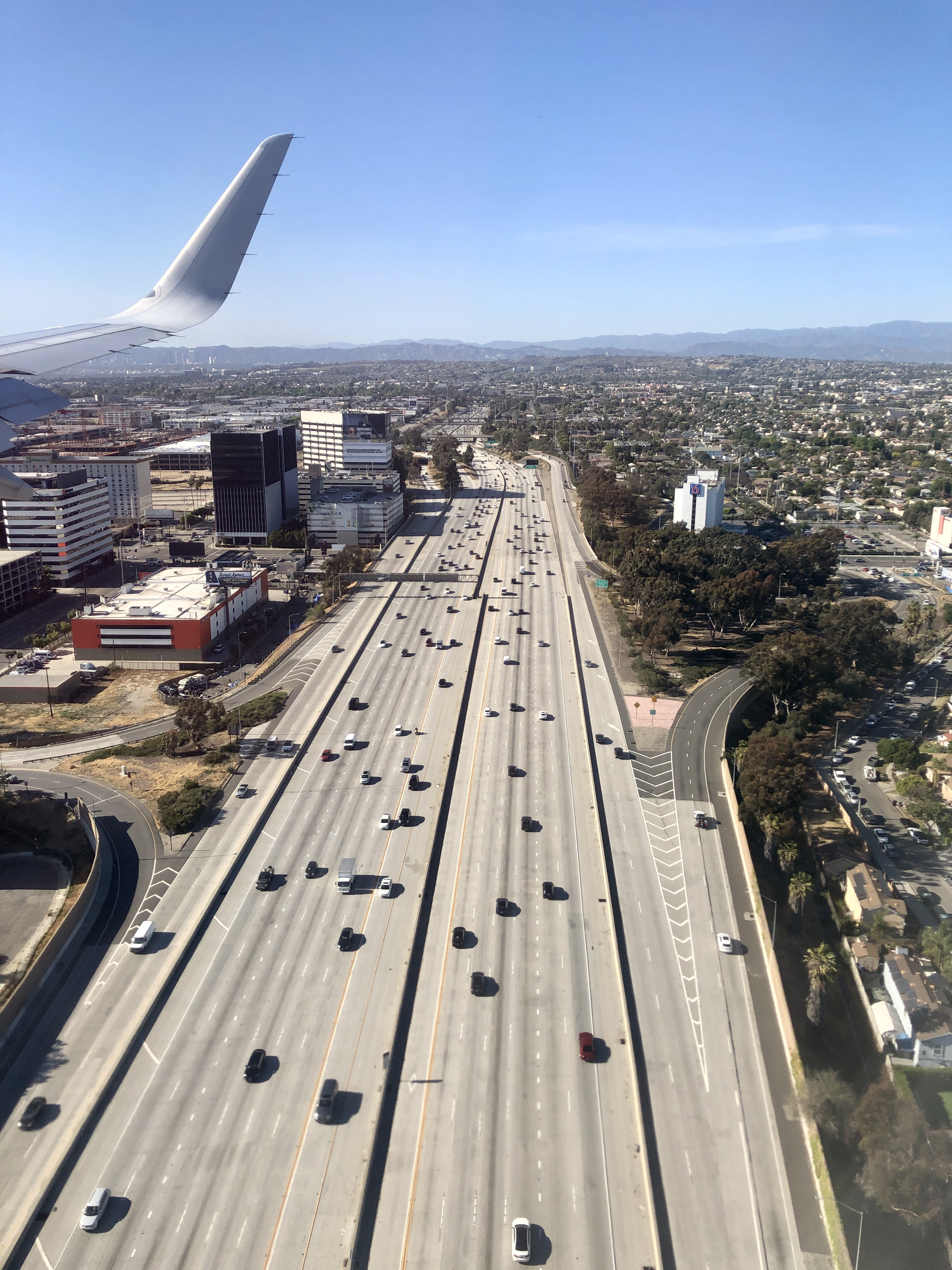
The I-405 freeway as seen from a plane landing at Los Angeles International Airport

The freeway then intersects with I-110 as it briefly reenters the city of Los Angeles by passing through the Harbor Gateway, a strip of land connecting San Pedro to the rest of the city. I-405 then continues to roughly parallel the contour of the coastline as it passes through the South Bay communities of Torrance, Lawndale, Redondo Beach, Hawthorne, and El Segundo. The freeway then encounters I-105 on the southeastern corner of Los Angeles International Airport. It passes to the east of the airport, serving it with exits at the Imperial Highway and Century Boulevard.

I-405 next passes through Inglewood, coming near SoFi Stadium, home to the Los Angeles Rams and Los Angeles Chargers of the National Football League. It then passes through Westchester and Culver City where it meets SR 90, the Marina Freeway. It serves the Los Angeles neighborhoods of Mar Vista and West Los Angeles while passing a few miles east of Santa Monica, intersecting with I-10 in the process. The freeway continues into Westwood, passing just to the west of University of California, Los Angeles. It then passes the Getty Center as it ascends Sepulveda Pass through the Santa Monica Mountains.

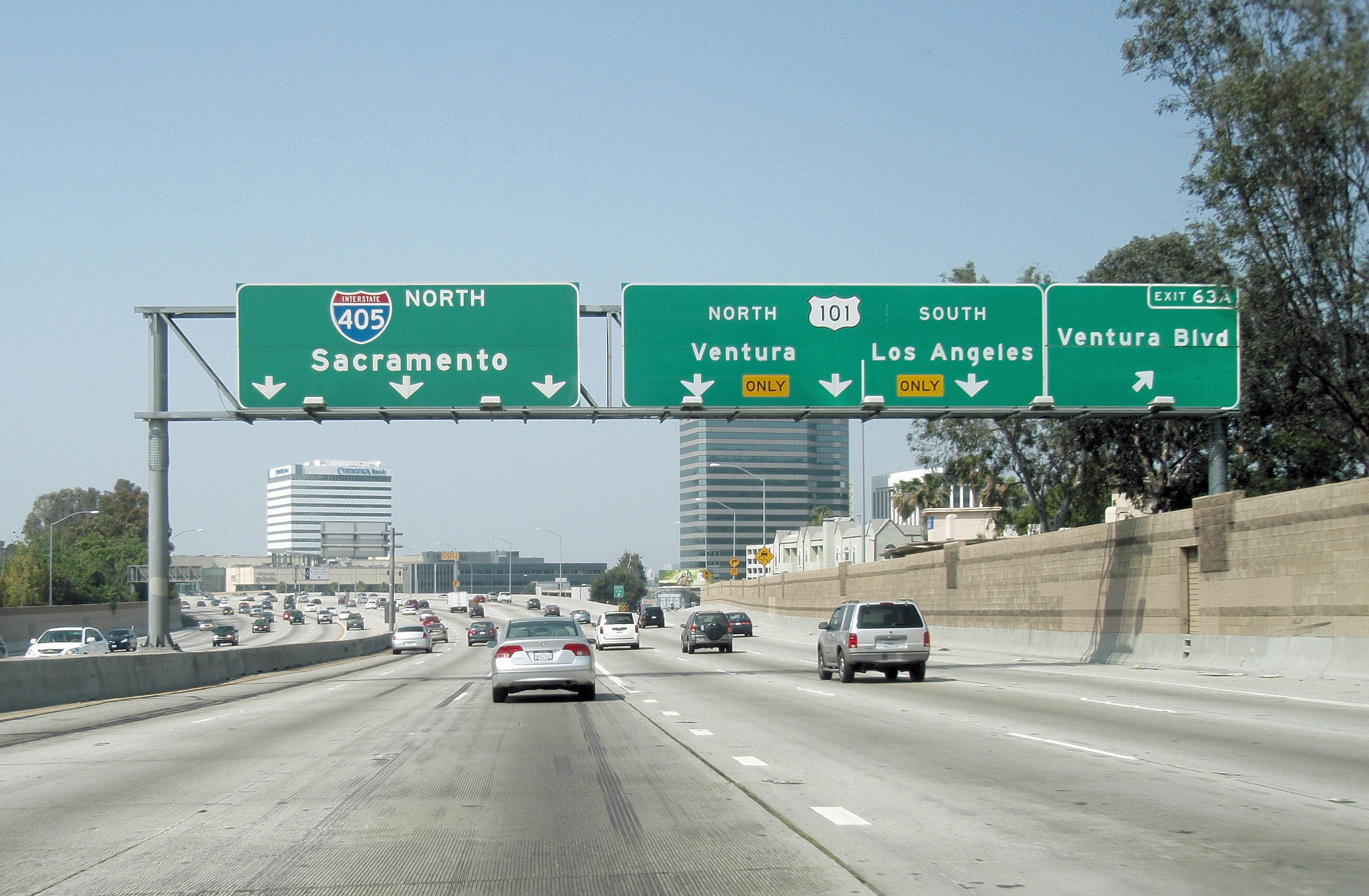
I-405 near the interchange with the Ventura Freeway (US 101)

After cresting the mountains, I-405 descends into the San Fernando Valley, intersecting US Route 101 (US 101) in the Sherman Oaks neighborhood of Los Angeles. The freeway then continues due north through the western part of the valley, passing east of Van Nuys Airport and California State University, Northridge. It intersects SR 118 in the Mission Hills area before ending in a merge with I-5 in Sylmar.

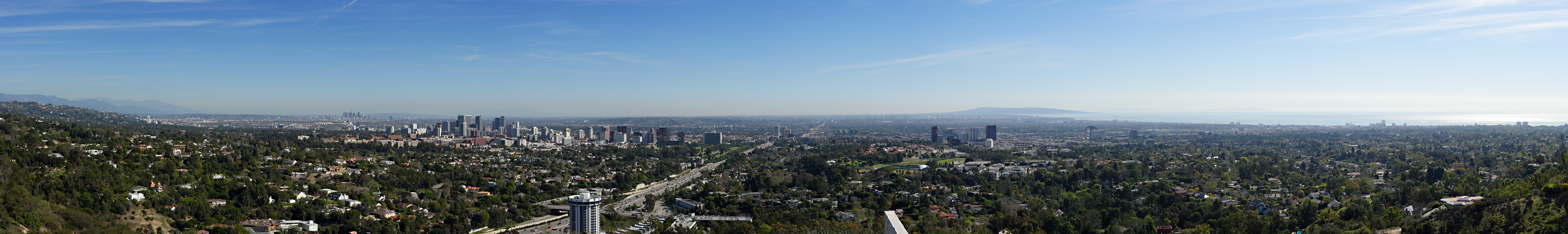
The view from the Getty Center, south of the Sepulveda Pass, looking east, south, and west. I-405 can be seen at the center.

== HOV and HOT lanes ==
Following the completion of the Sepulveda Pass Improvements Project in 2014, I-405 had the longest high-occupancy vehicle (HOV) lanes in California, stretching about 70 miles (110 km) of the highway.

Construction on the I-405 Improvement Project then started in March 2018, which included converting the existing HOV lanes to high-occupancy toll (HOT) lanes. The first segment of HOT lanes between SR 73 in Costa Mesa and I-605 in Seal Beach opened on December 1, 2023. The conversion included closing the lanes in November to test the tolling equipment. In addition, two lanes were added in each direction, one toll lane and one general purpose lane, making the upgrade from five to seven lanes in each direction.

As of January 2026, the HOT lanes are a 24/7 service. Solo drivers are tolled using a congestion pricing system based on the real-time levels of traffic. For two-person carpools, they are charged the posted toll during weekday peak hours between 6:00 am and 10:00 am and between 2:00 pm and 7:00 pm and weekend peak hours between 1:00 pm and 7:00 pm; no toll would charged during off-peak hours until 3 1/2 years after their opening. Carpools with three or more people and motorcycles are not charged. All tolls are collected using an open road tolling system, and therefore there are no toll booths to receive cash. Each vehicle using the HOT lanes is required to carry a FasTrak Flex transponder with its switch set to indicate the number of the vehicle's occupants (1, 2, or 3+). Solo drivers may also use the FasTrak standard tag without the switch. Drivers without any FasTrak tag will be assessed a toll violation regardless of whether they qualified for free.

== Traffic congestion ==
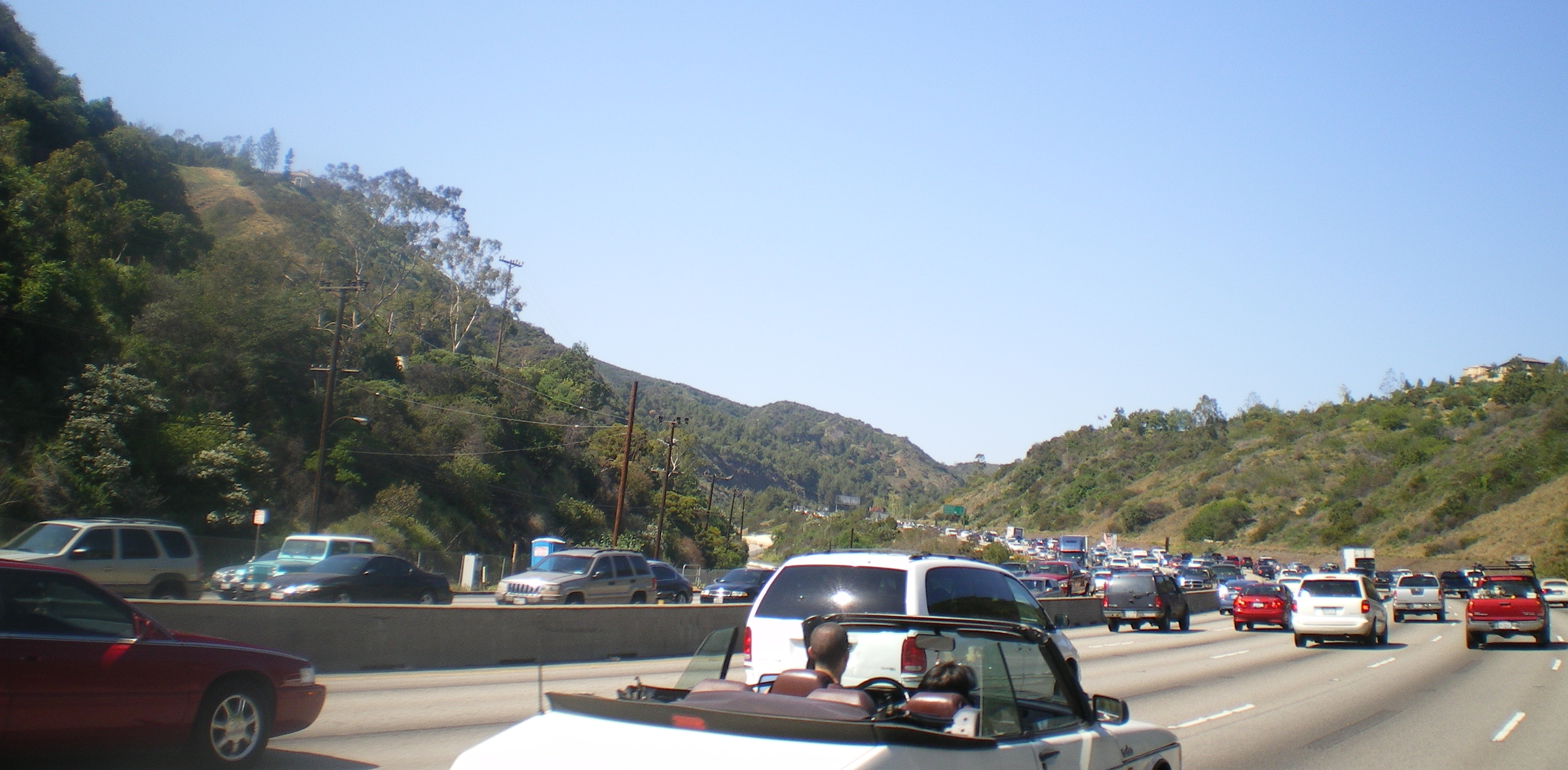
I-405 in Sepulveda Pass

The freeway is one of the busiest freeways in the nation and is the second busiest freeway in California, after I-5. A 2019 study by the Federal Highway Administration found that the 405's interchanges with the SR 73 and I-105 to Manchester Avenue was the 7th most congested bottleneck in the United States. As a result of these congestion problems, delays passing through the entirety of Greater Los Angeles using this bypass route instead of merely using the primary route I-5 through Downtown Los Angeles may be present.

I-405 is the only major north–south freeway in the densely populated areas between West Los Angeles and Downtown Los Angeles, crossing the Santa Monica Mountains and connecting the San Fernando Valley and the Los Angeles Basin. It is also a major connection for traffic en route to either the Port of Los Angeles, the Port of Long Beach, Los Angeles International Airport, or SoFi Stadium. By 2040, this corridor is estimated to increase by 35 percent and travel times reduced by 75 percent. The freeway's West Los Angeles section is the subject of annual gridlock photos and videos taken during the Thanksgiving holiday weekend, most often from an aerial view.

Another parallel freeway was proposed to connect the valley and basin (the Laurel Canyon Freeway or La Cienega Freeway) but has faced upper-class and NIMBY homeowner opposition. Despite four years of construction disruptions and billions of dollars of public money, Los Angeles Times commentary claims traffic with the lane expansions is actually just as bad or worse.

Unlike some of the other major travel corridors in the region (such as I-5 which parallels the LOSSAN Corridor), I-405 has no rail-based public transit which parallels it along the west side of Orange and Los Angeles counties. There is a proposal for a Sepulveda Transit Corridor which would parallel I-405 through Sepulveda Pass, one of the major bottlenecks on the route, which would ease congestion by providing an alternative to driving.

== History ==
State Route 7
- Location: Palos Verdes Peninsula–New Pine Creek
- Existed: 1934–1964

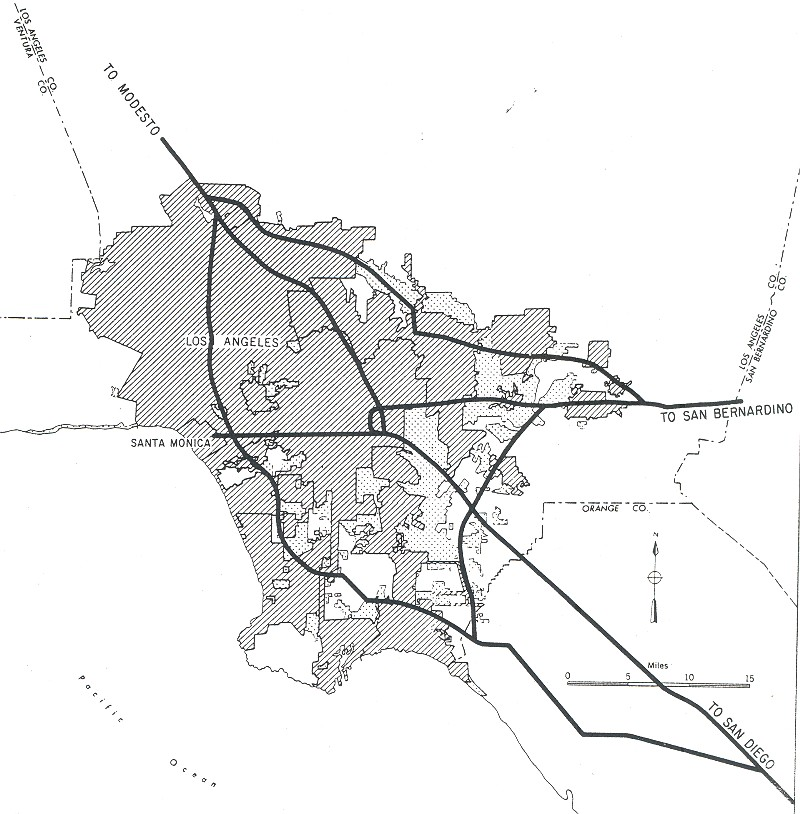
1955 map of the planned Interstates in the Los Angeles area; present-day I-405 roughly corresponds to the 1955 proposed route through the western regions of the area.

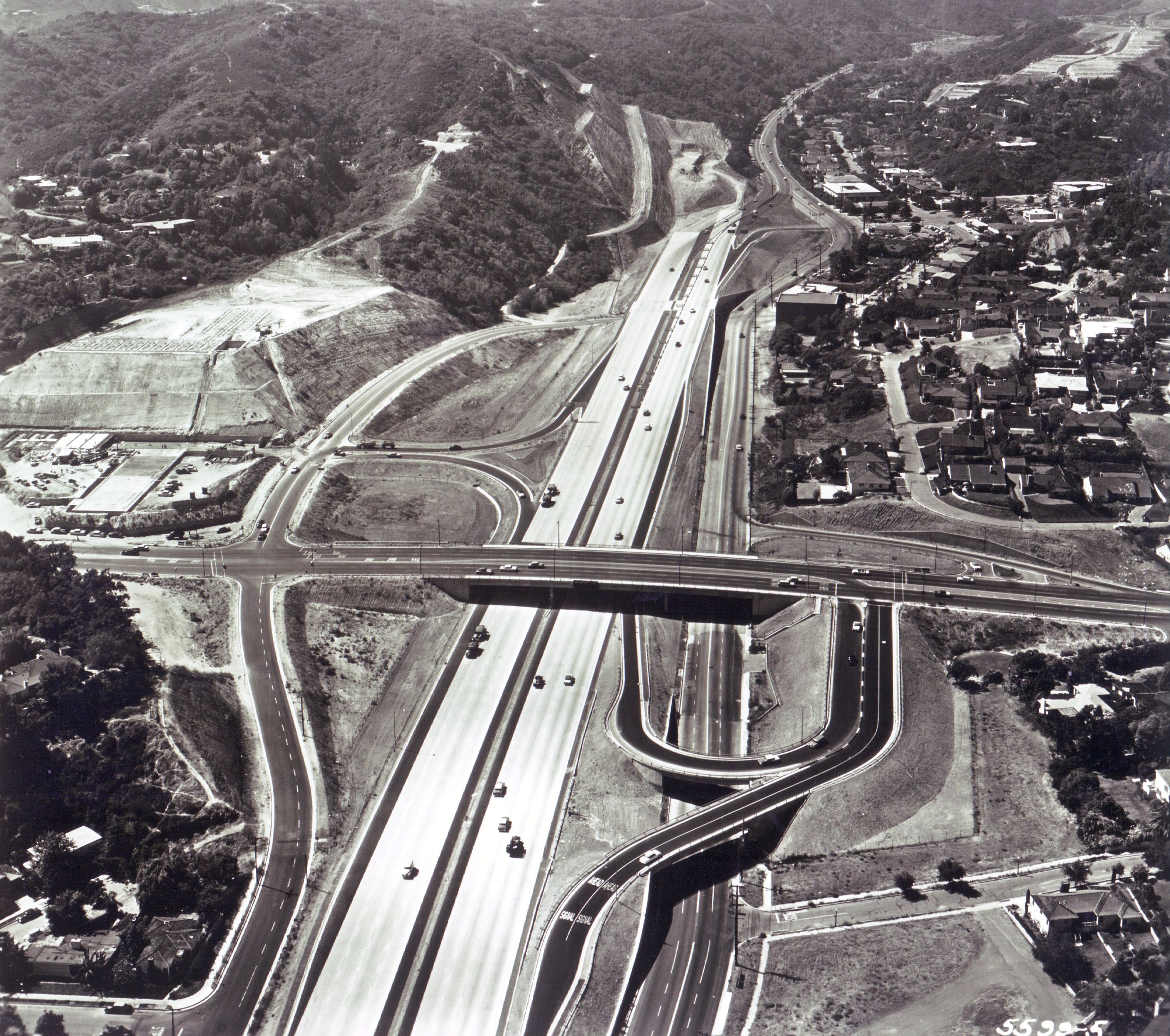
Temporary terminus during construction at the Sunset Boulevard interchange in 1957. The interstate continues into Sepulveda Boulevard via a temporary connector road.

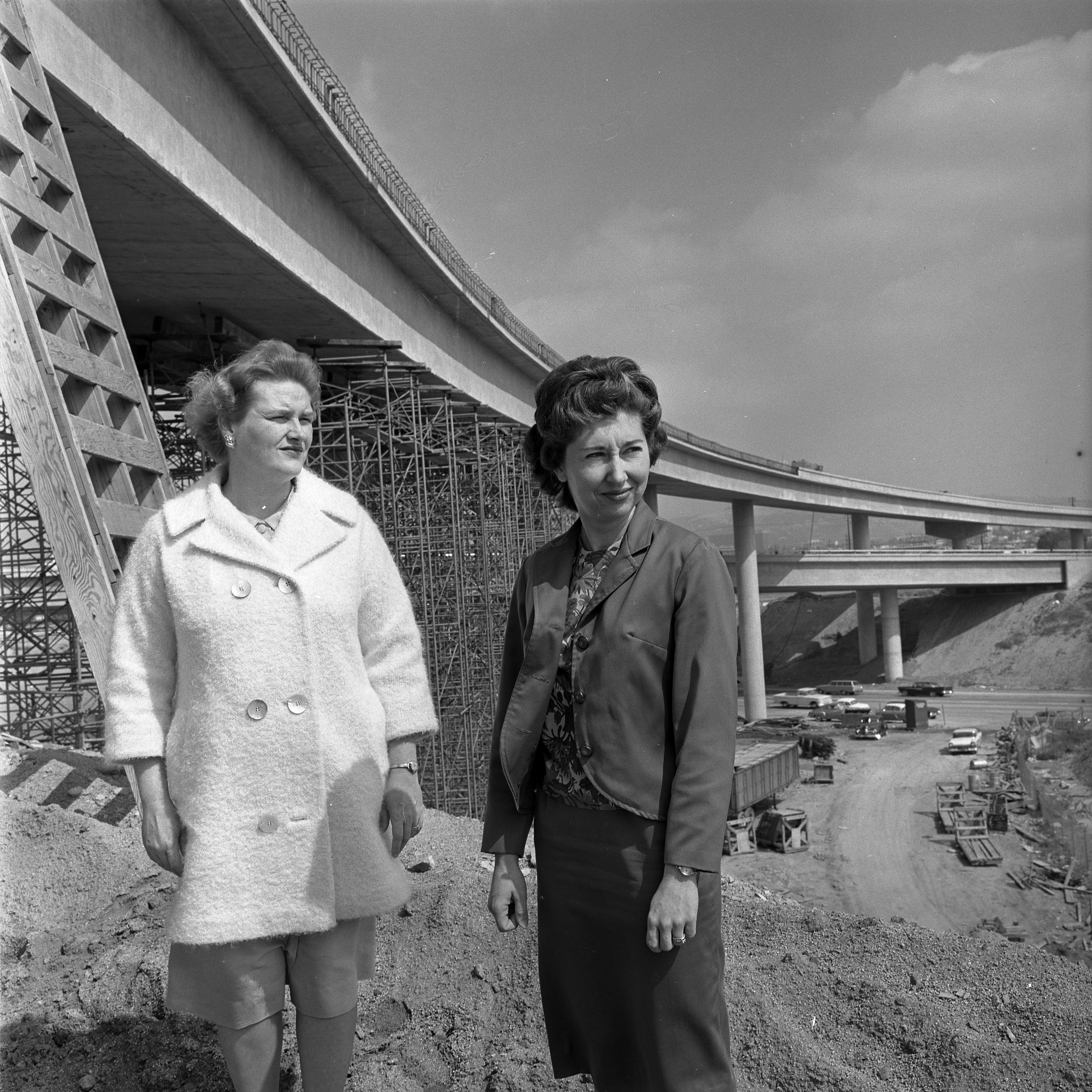
Civil engineers Marilyn Jorgenson Reece (left) and Carol Schumaker, at the Reece-designed I-10/I-405 interchange, 1964

I-405 was approved as a chargeable Interstate (in other words, an Interstate financed with federal funds) in 1955. The Division of Highways originally requested I-9 for the corridor, while the Santa Ana Freeway would be I-11; I-3 was later requested in April 1958 before the Division of Highways agreed to use I-405. Construction began in 1957 with the first section, mostly north of Los Angeles International Airport, which was completed in 1961 and initially signed as SR 7. The 5.7-mile (9.2 km) section through Sepulveda Pass was dedicated on December 21, 1962, and cost $20 million to construct. It was designed with a maximum grade of 5.5 percent and required the relocation of Sepulveda Boulevard and the Mulholland Highway, which was moved 1.1 miles (1.8 km) to the south along a new 579-foot-long (176 m) bridge over the freeway. Additional sections west of Alameda Street were completed in 1962 and 1963, creating 41.8 miles (67.3 km) of continuous freeway.

The highway was renumbered to I-405 during the 1964 state highway renumbering. The Orange County portion of the San Diego Freeway took 13 years to construct, with the first section opening in 1958. The final section of I-405, 8 miles (13 km) leading to I-5 in Irvine, was dedicated on December 6, 1968, and opened to traffic in January 1969.

=== "Carmageddon" ===
A section of I-405 was closed over the weekend of Friday, July 15, 2011, as part of the Sepulveda Pass Improvements Project. Before the closing, local radio DJs and television newscasts referred to it as "Carmageddon" and "Carpocalypse", parodying the notion of Armageddon and the Apocalypse, since it was anticipated that the closure would severely impact traffic. In reality, traffic was lighter than normal across a wide area. The California Department of Transportation (Caltrans) reported that fewer vehicles used the roads than usual, and those who did travel by road arrived more quickly than on a normal weekend. The Metrolink commuter train system recorded its highest-ever weekend ridership since it began operating in 1991. Ridership was 50 percent higher than the same weekend in 2010 and 10 percent higher than the previous weekend ridership record, which occurred during the U2 360° Tour in June 2011. The Los Angeles Times on Sunday, July 17, 2011, featured comments and images of people enjoying the moment next to the I-405 freeway with the free-flowing traffic.

In response to JetBlue's offer of special flights between Hollywood Burbank Airport in Burbank and Long Beach Airport, a distance of only 29 miles (47 km), for $4.00, a group of cyclists did the same journey in one and a half hours, compared to two and a half hours by plane (including a drive to the airport from West Hollywood 90 minutes in advance of the flight and travel time to the end destination). There was also some debate about whether the Los Angeles area could benefit from car-free weekends regularly.

The Los Angeles County Metropolitan Transportation Authority then had full closure of a 10-mile (16 km) stretch of I-405 on the weekend of September 29–30, 2012, while construction crews worked to demolish a portion of the Mulholland Bridge.

Researchers at the University of California, Los Angeles, used the closure of I-405 to study particulate matter air pollution. The researchers took air samples before, during, and after the closure. The researchers found an 83-percent reduction in ultrafine particles, 55-percent reduction in fine particle matter, and 62-percent less black carbon.

=== Sepulveda Pass Improvements Project ===
The $1-billion Sepulveda Pass Improvements Project added a high-occupancy vehicle (HOV) lane and associated changes to freeway entrances, exits, and underpasses along a 10-mile (16 km) stretch through Sepulveda Pass between I-10 and US 101/Ventura Boulevard. The project was completed as a design–build in contrast to the traditional design–bid–build used typically in infrastructure improvement. This section of I-405 was closed for a weekend in mid-July 2011 to demolish the Mulholland Drive Bridge, and a 10-mile (16 km) section was closed for the last weekend of September 2012.

Jamzilla was the name for the I-405 closure on Presidents' Day weekend 2014. There were lane closures and complete closures on I-405 starting February 14 at 10:00 pm until February 18 at 6:00 am to pave and restripe the northbound lanes.

On May 23, 2014, the 10-mile (16 km) HOV lane was opened to traffic.

== Future ==
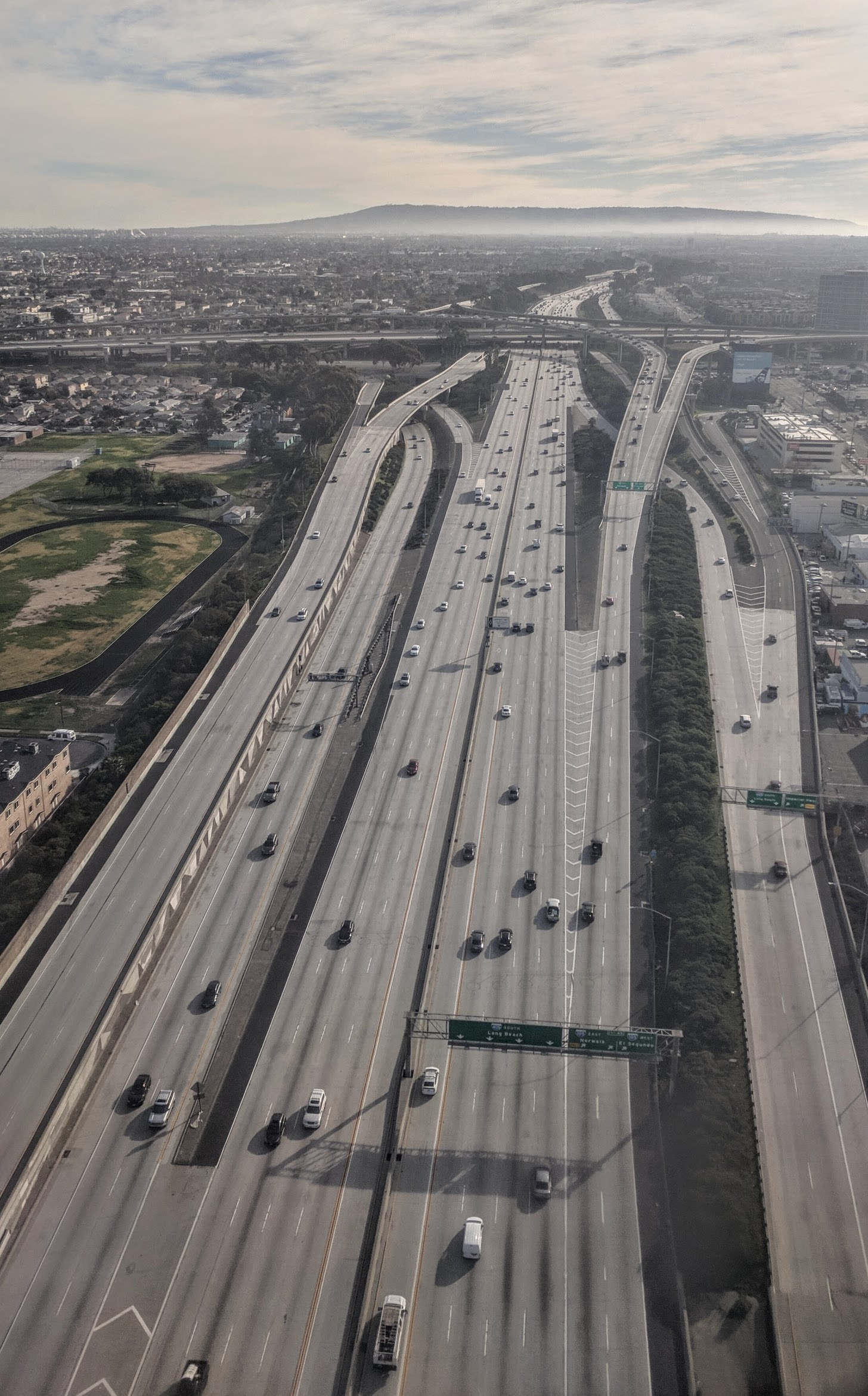
Aerial view from the north of I-405's interchange with I-105 near Los Angeles International Airport from directly above Arbor Vitae Street; the hills of the Palos Verdes Peninsula are visible in the distance

=== Manchester and Century Boulevard interchanges ===
Proposed changes between the Manchester and Century Boulevard interchanges in the city of Inglewood are to provide a new southbound onramp and a new northbound offramp for Arbor Vitae Street, to reconstruct and widened the Arbor Vitae Street over-bridge and replace the Century Boulevard overcrossing structure. This work would reduce congestion on the approach to Los Angeles International Airport. Caltrans has not yet issued a start date for this work.

=== Sepulveda Pass express lanes ===
The HOVs lane that were constructed as part of the Sepulveda Pass Improvements Project are proposed to be upgraded to express lanes by 2028.

== Exit list ==
County	Location	mi	km	Exit	Destinations	Notes
Orange	Irvine	0.00	0.00	—	I-5 south (San Diego Freeway south) – San Diego	Southern terminus; El Toro Y; no access to I-5 north; I-5 north exit 94A; San Diego Freeway continues as I-5 south; former US 101 south
Orange	Irvine	0.72	1.16	1A	Lake Forest Drive	No northbound exit
Orange	Irvine	0.72	1.16	1B	Bake Parkway	No northbound exit
Orange	Irvine	0.72	1.16	1C	Irvine Center Drive	Signed as exit 1 northbound
Orange	Irvine			♦	I-5 south	HOV access only; southbound exit and northbound entrance
Orange	Irvine	1.57	2.53	2	SR 133 south (Laguna Freeway) – Laguna Beach	SR 133 north exit 8
Orange	Irvine	1.57	2.53	2	SR 133 north (Laguna Freeway) to toll road	Southbound exit and northbound entrance; SR 133 south exits 8A-B
Orange	Irvine	2.65	4.26	3	Shady Canyon Drive / Sand Canyon Avenue	Serves Hoag Hospital Irvine, Kaiser Permanente Orange County – Irvine Medical Center
Orange	Irvine	3.72	5.99	4	Jeffrey Road / University Drive	
Orange	Irvine	5.39	8.67	5	Culver Drive	
Orange	Irvine	6.69	10.77	7	Jamboree Road	
Orange	Irvine	7.57	12.18	8	MacArthur Boulevard – John Wayne Airport	
Orange	Costa Mesa	8.51	13.70	9A	SR 55 north (Costa Mesa Freeway)	SR 55 south exits 6A-B
Orange	Costa Mesa	8.51	13.70	9A	SR 55 south (Costa Mesa Freeway)	Northbound exit and southbound entrance; southbound access is via exit 10; SR 55 north exit 6
Orange	Costa Mesa			♦	SR 55 north	HOV access only
Orange	Costa Mesa	9.28	14.93	9B	Anton Boulevard / Avenue of the Arts / Bristol Street	Northbound signage
Orange	Costa Mesa	9.28	14.93	9B	Bristol Street	Southbound signage
Orange	Costa Mesa			—	405 Express Lanes	South end of express lanes; opened in December 2023
Orange	Costa Mesa	10.05	16.17	10	SR 73 south (Corona del Mar Freeway) to SR 55 south (Costa Mesa Freeway) – San Diego via toll road	Southbound exit and northbound entrance
Orange	Costa Mesa	10.05	16.17	—	SR 73 south	Express Lanes access only; southbound exit and northbound entrance
Orange	Costa Mesa	10.05	16.17	11	South Coast Drive / Fairview Road / Susan Street / Harbor Boulevard	Northbound exit only
Orange	Costa Mesa	10.59	17.04	11A	Fairview Road	Signed as part of exit 11 northbound
Orange	Costa Mesa	10.59	17.04	11B	Harbor Boulevard	Signed as part of exit 11 northbound
Orange	Fountain Valley	12.24	19.70	12	Euclid Street / Newhope Street / Ellis Avenue	Ellis Avenue not signed northbound; Newhope Street not signed southbound
Orange	Fountain Valley	13.55	21.81	14	Brookhurst Street	Serves MemorialCare Orange Coast Medical Center
Orange	Fountain Valley	14.59	23.48	15A	Warner Avenue west	Northbound signage
Orange	Fountain Valley	14.59	23.48	15A	Warner Avenue east	Southbound signage
Orange	Fountain Valley–Huntington Beach– Westminster tripoint	14.98	24.11	15B	Magnolia Street	Northbound signage
Orange	Fountain Valley–Huntington Beach– Westminster tripoint	14.98	24.11	15B	Magnolia Street / Warner Avenue west	Southbound signage
Orange	Huntington Beach–Westminster line	16.31	26.25	16	SR 39 (Beach Boulevard) – Westminster, Huntington Beach	Serves Huntington Beach Hospital
Orange	Westminster	17.52	28.20	18	Bolsa Avenue / Goldenwest Street	
Orange	Westminster	18.93	30.46	19	Westminster Boulevard / Springdale Street	Springdale Street not signed northbound; signed as exits 19A (Westminster Boulevard east) and 19B (Westminster Boulevard west / Springdale Street) southbound
Orange	Westminster	20.33	32.72	20	Bolsa Chica Road / Valley View Street to SR 22 east	Signed as exit 21 northbound; Bolsa Chica Road not signed northbound; SR 22 east not signed southbound
Orange	Westminster–Garden Grove line	20.52	33.02	21	SR 22 east (Garden Grove Freeway) – Garden Grove	Southern end of SR 22 concurrency; southbound exit and northbound entrance; northbound access is via exit 21
Orange	Westminster–Garden Grove line			—	SR 22 east	Express Lanes access only; southbound exit and northbound entrance
Orange	Seal Beach	22.41	36.07	22	Seal Beach Boulevard / Los Alamitos Boulevard	Seal Beach Boulevard was formerly Bay Boulevard; Los Alamitos Boulevard was former SR 35
Orange	Seal Beach	23.05	37.10	23	SR 22 west (7th Street)	Northern end of SR 22 concurrency; northbound signage; I-605 south exit 1A
Orange	Seal Beach	23.05	37.10	—	I-605 north	Express Lanes access only; northbound exit and southbound entrance
Orange	Seal Beach	23.05	37.10	—	405 Express Lanes	North end of express lanes; opened in December 2023
Orange	Seal Beach	23.05	37.10	23	SR 22 west (7th Street) – Long Beach	Southbound signage; SR 22 east exit 2; I-605 south exit 1A
Orange–Los Angeles county line	Seal Beach–Long Beach– Los Alamitos tripoint	23.81	38.32	24A	I-605 north (San Gabriel River Freeway)	Signed as exit 24 northbound; I-605 north exit 1A, south exits 1B-C; SR 22 exit 2
Orange–Los Angeles county line	Seal Beach–Long Beach line	23.95	38.54	San Gabriel River		
Los Angeles	Long Beach	24.40	39.27	24B	Studebaker Road	Southbound exit and northbound entrance
Los Angeles	Long Beach	25.06	40.33	25	Palo Verde Avenue	
Los Angeles	Long Beach	25.59	41.18	26A	Woodruff Avenue	No southbound exit
Los Angeles	Long Beach	26.13	42.05	26B	Bellflower Boulevard	Signed as exit 26 southbound
Los Angeles	Long Beach	27.27	43.89	27	SR 19 (Lakewood Boulevard) – Long Beach Airport	
Los Angeles	Long Beach	28.83	46.40	29	Spring Street / Cherry Avenue – Signal Hill	Signed as exits 29A (south) and 29B (north)
Los Angeles	Signal Hill	29.37	47.27	29C	Orange Avenue	
Los Angeles	Signal Hill–Long Beach line	29.85	48.04	30A	Atlantic Avenue	Serves MemorialCare Long Beach Medical Center
Los Angeles	Long Beach	30.11	48.46	30B	Long Beach Boulevard	Former SR 15
Los Angeles	Long Beach	31.37	50.49	32A	Pacific Avenue	Southbound exit and northbound entrance
Los Angeles	Long Beach	31.83	51.23	32B	I-710 south (Long Beach Freeway) – Long Beach	Signed as exits 32A (north) and 32B (south) northbound; I-710 exit 4
Los Angeles	Long Beach	31.83	51.23	32C	I-710 north (Long Beach Freeway) – Pasadena	Signed as exits 32A (north) and 32B (south) northbound; I-710 exit 4
Los Angeles	Long Beach	31.87	51.29	32D	Hughes Way / Santa Fe Avenue	Signed as exit 32C northbound; Hughes Way not signed southbound
Los Angeles	Carson	32.55	52.38	33A	Alameda Street (SR 47 south)	Southbound exit and entrance connects to 223rd Street
Los Angeles	Carson	33.33	53.64	33B	Wilmington Avenue	
Los Angeles	Carson	34.31	55.22	34	Carson Street	
Los Angeles	Carson	35.00	56.33	35	Avalon Boulevard	Northbound exit to Avalon Boulevard south is via exit 34
Los Angeles	Carson	35.57– 35.77	57.24– 57.57	Weigh station		
Los Angeles	Carson	36.37	58.53	36	Main Street	Northbound exit and southbound entrance
Los Angeles	Carson	36.74	59.13	37A	I-110 (Harbor Freeway) – San Pedro, Los Angeles	Signed as exit 37 northbound; former US 6; I-110 exit 9
Los Angeles	Los Angeles	37.01	59.56	37B	Vermont Avenue	Southbound exit and northbound entrance
Los Angeles	Los Angeles	37.60	60.51	38A	Normandie Avenue – Gardena	
Los Angeles	Los Angeles–Torrance line	38.19	61.46	38B	Western Avenue	
Los Angeles	Torrance	39.22	63.12	39	Crenshaw Boulevard	
Los Angeles	Torrance	40.35	64.94	40A	Artesia Boulevard to SR 91	Signed as exit 40 northbound; former SR 91
Los Angeles	Lawndale	40.65	65.42	40B	Redondo Beach Boulevard – Redondo Beach	Southbound exit and northbound entrance
Los Angeles	Lawndale	41.36	66.56	42A	SR 107 (Hawthorne Boulevard) – Lawndale	
Los Angeles	Lawndale–Redondo Beach line	42.01	67.61	42B	Inglewood Avenue	
Los Angeles	Hawthorne	42.98	69.17	43	Rosecrans Avenue – Manhattan Beach	Signed as exits 43A (east/west) and 43B (west) southbound
Los Angeles	Hawthorne	43.99	70.80	44	El Segundo Boulevard – El Segundo	
Los Angeles	Lennox	44.95	72.34	45A	I-105 (Century Freeway) – El Segundo, Norwalk	Signed as exit 45 southbound; serves Los Angeles International Airport; I-105 east exit 2, west exit 2B
Los Angeles	Lennox	44.95	72.34	45B	Imperial Highway	Southbound exit is part of exit 46
Los Angeles	Inglewood	46.00	74.03	46	Century Boulevard – LAX Airport	
Los Angeles	Inglewood	47.13	75.85	47	Manchester Boulevard / La Cienega Boulevard / Florence Avenue	Manchester Boulevard was former SR 42
Los Angeles	Los Angeles	48.05	77.33	48	La Tijera Boulevard	
Los Angeles	Los Angeles	48.33	77.78	49A	Howard Hughes Parkway / Sepulveda Boulevard	Signed as exit 49 southbound
Los Angeles	Culver City	49.23	79.23	49B	Sepulveda Boulevard / Slauson Avenue (SR 90 east)	Northbound exit only; SR 90 exit 2
Los Angeles	Culver City–Los Angeles line	49.70	79.98	50A	Jefferson Boulevard	Signed as exit 50B northbound
Los Angeles	Culver City–Los Angeles line	49.70	79.98	50B	SR 90 west (Marina Freeway) – Marina del Ray	Signed as exit 50A northbound; SR 90 east exit 2
Los Angeles	Culver City–Los Angeles line	49.70	79.98	50B	SR 90 east (Marina Freeway) / Slauson Avenue	Southbound exit and northbound entrance; SR 90 west exit 2
Los Angeles	Culver City	50.97	82.03	51	Culver Boulevard / Washington Boulevard	
Los Angeles	Culver City	51.22	82.43	52	Venice Boulevard / Washington Boulevard	Venice Boulevard was former SR 187
Los Angeles	Los Angeles	52.94	85.20	53A	National Boulevard	Northbound exit and southbound entrance
Los Angeles	Los Angeles	53.31	85.79	53B	I-10 (Santa Monica Freeway) – Santa Monica, Los Angeles	Signed as exit 53 southbound; I-10 exits 3A-B
Los Angeles	Los Angeles	53.96	86.84	54	Olympic Boulevard / Pico Boulevard	Southbound exit and northbound entrance; former SR 26
Los Angeles	Los Angeles	54.63	87.92	55A	SR 2 (Santa Monica Boulevard)	Former US 66
Los Angeles		55.31– 55.34	89.01– 89.06	55B	Wilshire Boulevard	Signed as exits 55B (east) and 55C (west) southbound; serves Ronald Reagan UCLA Medical Center
Los Angeles	Los Angeles	56.27	90.56	56	Montana Avenue	Northbound exit only; demolished
Los Angeles	Los Angeles	56.77	91.36	57A	Sunset Boulevard	Signed as exit 57 southbound
Los Angeles	Los Angeles	57.06	91.83	57B	Moraga Drive	Northbound exit and entrance
Los Angeles	Los Angeles	58.54	94.21	59	Getty Center Drive	
Los Angeles	Los Angeles	60.80	97.85	61	Mulholland Drive / Skirball Center Drive	
Los Angeles	Los Angeles	60.90	98.01	Sepulveda Pass, elevation 1,129 feet (344 m)		
Los Angeles	Los Angeles	62.78	101.03	63A	Ventura Boulevard / Sepulveda Boulevard / Valley Vista Boulevard	Serves Encino Hospital Medical Center
Los Angeles	Los Angeles	63.20	101.71	63B	US 101 (Ventura Freeway) – Ventura, Los Angeles	US 101 exit 19A
Los Angeles	Los Angeles	64.06	103.09	64	Burbank Boulevard	
Los Angeles	Los Angeles	65.13	104.82	65	Victory Boulevard – Van Nuys	Serves Valley Presbyterian Hospital (northbound only)
Los Angeles	Los Angeles	66.14– 66.17	106.44– 106.49	66	Sherman Way – Van Nuys Airport	Signed as exits 66A (east) and 66B (west) northbound; serves Valley Presbyterian Hospital (southbound only)
Los Angeles	Los Angeles	67.53	108.68	68	Roscoe Boulevard – Panorama City	Serves Mission Community Hospital
Los Angeles	Los Angeles	68.51	110.26	69	Nordhoff Street	
Los Angeles	Los Angeles	70.03	112.70	70	Devonshire Street – Granada Hills	
Los Angeles	Los Angeles	70.62	113.65	71A	SR 118 west (Ronald Reagan Freeway) – Simi Valley	Signed as exit 71 southbound; SR 118 east exit 42A
Los Angeles	Los Angeles	70.62	113.65	71A	SR 118 east (Ronald Reagan Freeway)	Northbound exit and southbound entrance; SR 118 west exit 42B
Los Angeles	Los Angeles	71.01	114.28	71B	San Fernando Mission Boulevard	Northbound exit and southbound entrance
Los Angeles	Los Angeles	71.53	115.12	72	Rinaldi Street – Mission Hills	Serves Providence Holy Cross Medical Center
Los Angeles	Los Angeles	72.42	116.55	—	I-5 north (Golden State Freeway) – Sacramento	Northern terminus; no access to I-5 south; I-5 south exit 158
1.000 mi = 1.609 km; 1.000 km = 0.621 mi: Closed/former; Concurrency terminus; Electronic toll collection; HOV only; Incomplete access
