= California State Route 22 =

Highway in Los Angeles and Orange counties in California, United States

State Route 22
- SR 22 highlighted in red

Route information
- Maintained by Caltrans
- Length: 14.725 mi (23.698 km) SR 22's length is broken into pieces and therefore does not reflect the overlaps that would be required to make the route continuous.
- Existed: 1934–present

Major junctions
- West end: SR 1 in Long Beach
- I-605 in Seal Beach; I-405 in Seal Beach; I-5 / SR 57 in Santa Ana
- East end: SR 55 in Orange

Location
- Country: United States
- State: California
- Counties: Los Angeles, Orange

Highway system
- State highways in California; Interstate; US; State; Scenic; History; Pre‑1964; Unconstructed; Deleted; Freeways
| ← SR 20 | → SR 23 |

State Route 22 (SR 22) is an east–west state highway in the U.S. state of California that connects Long Beach with northern Orange County. It runs between Pacific Coast Highway (State Route 1) in Long Beach and the Costa Mesa Freeway (State Route 55) in Orange by way of Garden Grove. The westernmost part of SR 22 runs along Long Beach's 7th Street. From West Garden Grove to its eastern terminus in Orange, it is known as the Garden Grove Freeway. It is one of the two principal east–west routes in Orange County (the other being SR 91 approximately 6 miles (9.7 km) to the north). SR 22 is also known colloquially to Southern California residents as "the 22".

== Route description ==
Route 22 is defined in section 322 of the California Streets and Highways Code:

Route 22 is from:
(a) Route 1 near Long Beach to Route 405.
(b) Route 405 to Route 55 near Orange.

SR 22 begins at the intersection of 7th Street and Pacific Coast Highway (State Route 1) in Long Beach. Then, 7th Street widens from an expressway into a freeway just before crossing the San Gabriel River (and with it, the Los Angeles/Orange County line). It then merges with the San Diego Freeway (Interstate 405) at the Interstate 605 interchange and runs concurrently with it for approximately three miles before the two routes diverge in northeastern Seal Beach. Thereafter, the Garden Grove Freeway travels mostly within the city of Garden Grove or along its border with neighboring Westminster. Just inside the Orange city limits, the freeway enters the infamously congested Orange Crush interchange with the Santa Ana and Orange Freeways (Interstate 5 and State Route 57, respectively). It continues along the border of Orange and Santa Ana for 3 miles (4.8 km) until terminating at the Costa Mesa Freeway (State Route 55).

SR 22 is part of the California Freeway and Expressway System, and is part of the National Highway System, a network of highways that are considered essential to the country's economy, defense, and mobility by the Federal Highway Administration. SR 22 from I-405 to SR 55 is known as the Garden Grove Freeway, as named by the State Highway Commission on October 22, 1957. An 8-mile (13 km) stretch of Route 22 is named the Garden Grove Police Officers Memorial Highway to honor police officers killed in the line of duty.

== History ==
SR 22 was originally designated in 1934, when the state highway system was first numbered. Before the freeway was built, it was routed along Garden Grove Boulevard (formerly Ocean Avenue).

Opened in 1967, the Garden Grove Freeway had the distinction of being one of the few freeways in Southern California to have never been widened from its original alignment, eventually resulting in severe rush hour congestion, particularly as Santa Ana's population surged to over 300,000 during the 1990s.

In late 2004, in response to California's budgetary deficit, OCTA began a widening project to add one mixed-flow and one high occupancy vehicle lane to the route in each direction, as well as reconfiguring and upgrading on and off ramps to contemporary standards at several interchanges, all funded by Measure M, the half-cent tax approved by Orange County voters in 1990 and later renewed in 2006. This $700 million Design-Build projected completed in a record 2 year time frame in 2007 was led by consortium composed of Granite Construction and URS Corp. as the lead designer along with several sub-consultants. A second phase to add HOV lane interchanges at the I-605 junction and at the split with I-405 was completed in 2014.

== Exit list ==
Except where prefixed with a letter, postmiles were measured on the road as it was in 1964, based on the alignment that existed at the time, and do not necessarily reflect current mileage. Postmile prefixes include: R reflecting a realignment in the route since then, M indicating a second realignment, L referring to an overlap due to a correction or change, and T indicating postmiles classified as temporary. Segments that remain unconstructed or have been relinquished to local control may be omitted. The numbers reset at county lines; the start and end postmiles in each county are given in the county column.

| County | Location | Postmile | Exit | Destinations | Notes |
|---|---|---|---|---|---|
| Los Angeles; LA 0.00-1.47 | Long Beach | 0.00 | | 7th Street | Continuation beyond SR 1 |
| Los Angeles; LA 0.00-1.47 | Long Beach | 0.00 | | SR 1 north (Pacific Coast Highway) | Western terminus; no left turn to SR 1 south; former US 101 Alt. |
| Los Angeles; LA 0.00-1.47 | Long Beach | 0.08 | | Bellflower Boulevard to SR 1 south (Pacific Coast Highway) | |
| Los Angeles; LA 0.00-1.47 | Long Beach | 1.14 | 1 | Studebaker Road | West end of freeway |
| Los Angeles; LA 0.00-1.47 | Long Beach | 1.42– 1.47 | San Gabriel River | | |
| Orange; ORA 0.00-R13.16 | Seal Beach | R0.37 | 2 | I-605 north (San Gabriel River Freeway) to I-405 north (San Diego Freeway) – Santa Monica | Southern terminus of I-605; eastbound exit and westbound entrance; I-605 south exit 1A |
| Orange; ORA 0.00-R13.16 | Seal Beach | R0.65 23.28 (Note: Indicates that the postmile represents the distance along I-405 rather than SR 22.) | — | I-405 north (San Diego Freeway) to I-605 north (San Gabriel River Freeway) – Santa Monica | West end of I-405 overlap; westbound left exit and eastbound left entrance; eastbound access is via exit 2; former SR 7; I-405 exit 23; I-605 south exit 1B |
| Orange; ORA 0.00-R13.16 | Seal Beach | 22.64 | 22 | Seal Beach Boulevard, Los Alamitos Boulevard | Exit number follows I-405; Seal Beach Boulevard was formerly Bay Boulevard; Los Alamitos Boulevard was former SR 35 |
| Orange; ORA 0.00-R13.16 | Seal Beach–Garden Grove– Westminster tripoint | 20.75 R0.66 | — | I-405 south (San Diego Freeway) – Irvine, San Diego | East end of I-405 overlap; eastbound left exit and westbound left entrance; eastbound access is via exit 5; I-405 south exit 21 |
| Orange; ORA 0.00-R13.16 | Garden Grove–Westminster line | R0.92 | 5 | Garden Grove Boulevard, Valley View Street, Bolsa Chica Road to I-405 south (San Diego Freeway) | Bolsa Chica Road/I-405 south not signed eastbound, Garden Grove Boulevard not signed westbound; I-405 north exit 21 |
| Orange; ORA 0.00-R13.16 | Garden Grove–Westminster line | R0.92 | — | 405 Express Lanes north | Westbound left exit and eastbound entrance; opened in December 2023 |
| Orange; ORA 0.00-R13.16 | Garden Grove–Westminster line | R2.65 | 7 | Knott Street, Goldenwest Street | |
| Orange; ORA 0.00-R13.16 | Garden Grove–Westminster line | R3.59 | 8 | SR 39 (Beach Boulevard) | |
| Orange; ORA 0.00-R13.16 | Garden Grove | R4.81 | 9 | Magnolia Street | |
| Orange; ORA 0.00-R13.16 | Garden Grove | R5.82 | 10 | Brookhurst Street – Garden Grove | |
| Orange; ORA 0.00-R13.16 | Garden Grove | R6.81 | 11 | Euclid Street | |
| Orange; ORA 0.00-R13.16 | Garden Grove | R7.83 | 12 | Harbor Boulevard | Signed as exits 12A (south) and 12B (north) eastbound |
| Orange; ORA 0.00-R13.16 | Garden Grove | R8.82 | 13 | Fairview Street | Eastbound signage |
| Orange; ORA 0.00-R13.16 | Garden Grove | R8.82 | 13 | Haster Street | Westbound signage |
| Orange; ORA 0.00-R13.16 | Orange | R9.73 | 14A | The City Drive | Formerly Manchester Avenue |
| Orange; ORA 0.00-R13.16 | Santa Ana | R10.01 | 14B | Bristol Street | Eastbound exit and westbound entrance |
| Orange; ORA 0.00-R13.16 | Orange–Santa Ana line | R10.48 | 14C | I-5 south (Santa Ana Freeway) – Santa Ana | Eastbound exit and westbound entrance; western end of Orange Crush interchange; I-5 north exit 106 |
| Orange; ORA 0.00-R13.16 | Orange–Santa Ana line | R10.48 | 14D | I-5 north (Santa Ana Freeway) / SR 57 north (Orange Freeway) – Los Angeles, Pomona | Eastern end of Orange Crush interchange; signed as exit 14B westbound; provides direct access to Chapman Avenue; I-5 south exit 107A-B; SR 57 south exits 1B-C |
| Orange; ORA 0.00-R13.16 | Orange | R10.99 | 15 | Main Street | Former SR 51 |
| Orange; ORA 0.00-R13.16 | Orange | R11.83 | 16 | Glassell Street, Grand Avenue | |
| Orange; ORA 0.00-R13.16 | Orange | R12.87 | 17A | Tustin Avenue | Eastbound exit and westbound entrance |
| Orange; ORA 0.00-R13.16 | Orange | R13.16 | 17B | SR 55 south (Costa Mesa Freeway) – Newport Beach | Eastern terminus of SR 22; SR 55 exit 13 |
| Orange; ORA 0.00-R13.16 | Orange | R13.16 | 17C | SR 55 north (Costa Mesa Freeway) – Anaheim, Riverside | Eastern terminus of SR 22; SR 55 exit 13 |
1.000 mi = 1.609 km; 1.000 km = 0.621 mi: Concurrency terminus; Electronic toll collection; Incomplete access
