= Fountain Valley, California =

City in California, United States

- City
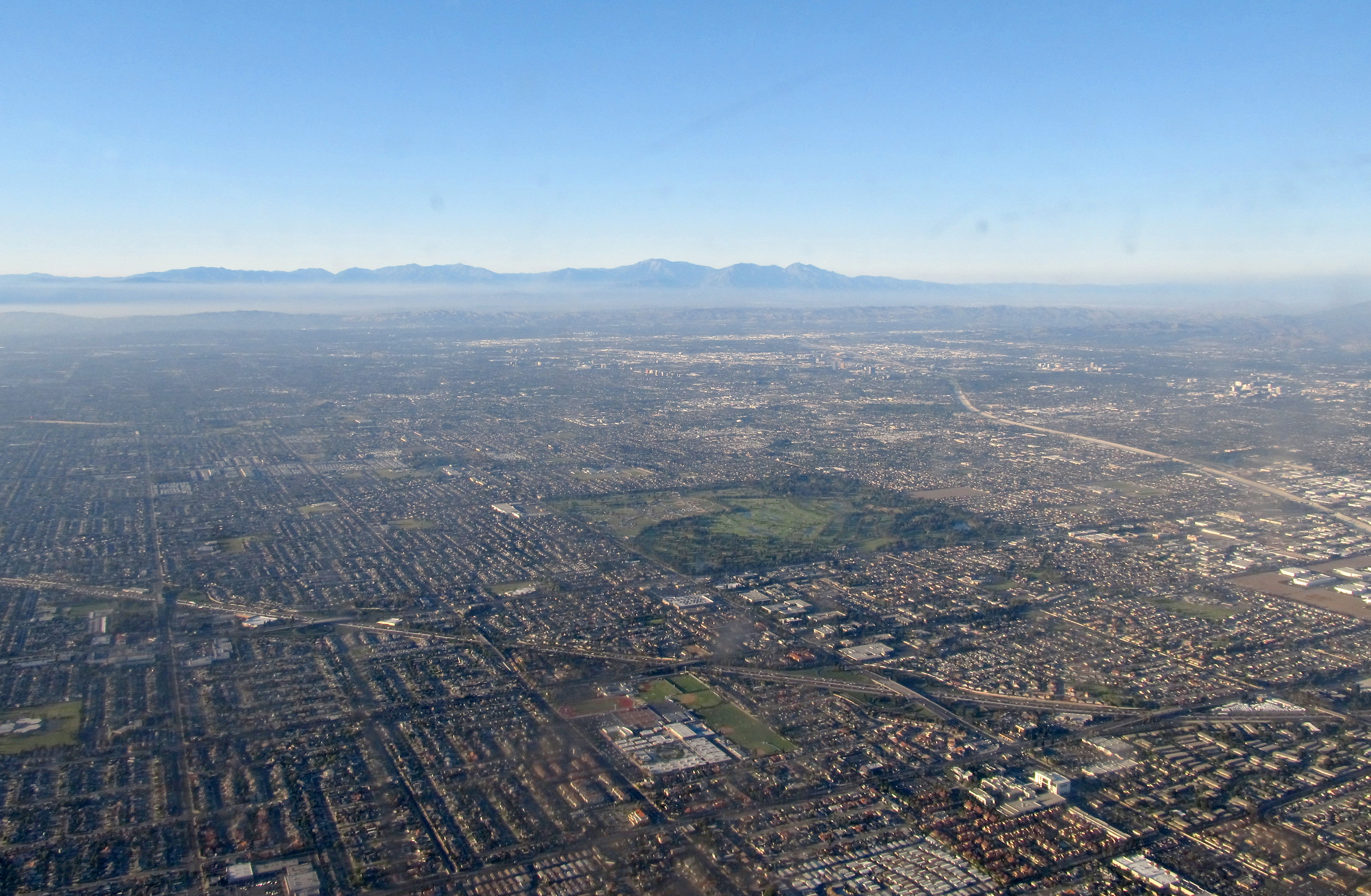
- Fountain Valley

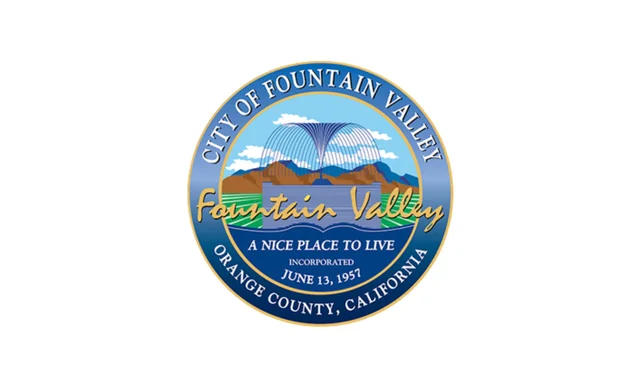
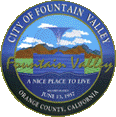
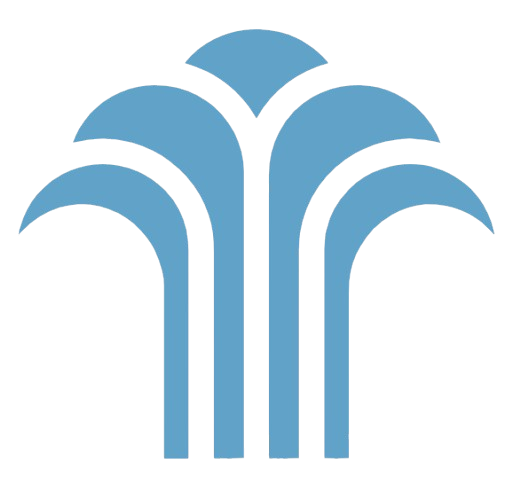
- Flag Seal Logo
- Nickname: Gospel Swamps
- Motto: "A Nice Place to Live"
- Interactive map of Fountain Valley, California
- Location within Greater Los Angeles Location in California Location in the United States
- Coordinates: 33°42′31″N 117°57′23″W
- Country: United States
- State: California
- County: Orange
- Incorporated: June 13, 1957

Government
  - Type: Council-Manager
  - Mayor: Jim Cunneen (R)
  - Vice Mayor: Patrick Harper
  - City Council: Kim Constantine; Ted Bui; Patrick Harper; Glenn Grandis
  - City Manager: Maggie Le

Area
  - Total: 9.08 sq mi (23.53 km^{2})
  - Land: 9.07 sq mi (23.50 km^{2})
  - Water: 0.012 sq mi (0.03 km^{2}) 0.14%
- Elevation: 33 ft (10 m)

Population (2020)
  - Total: 57,047
  - Density: 6,287/sq mi (2,428/km^{2})
- Time zone: UTC-8 (Pacific)
  - Summer (DST): UTC-7 (PDT)
- ZIP codes: 92708, 92728
- Area codes: 657/714
- FIPS code: 06-25380
- GNIS feature ID: 1652712
- Website: fountainvalley.gov

Fountain Valley is a suburban city in Orange County, California. The population was 57,047 in the 2020 census.

== History ==
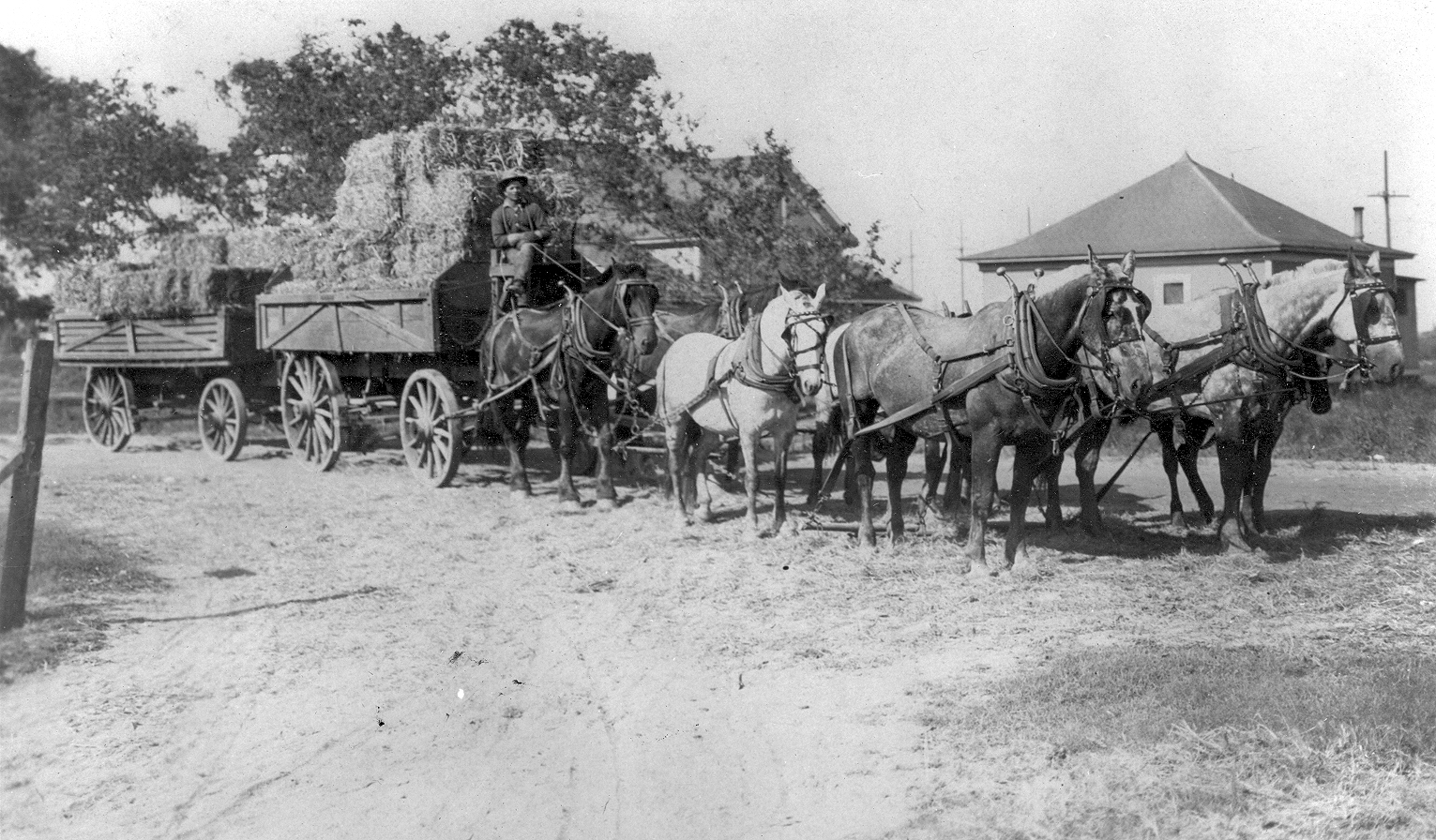
Hauling hay in Talbert

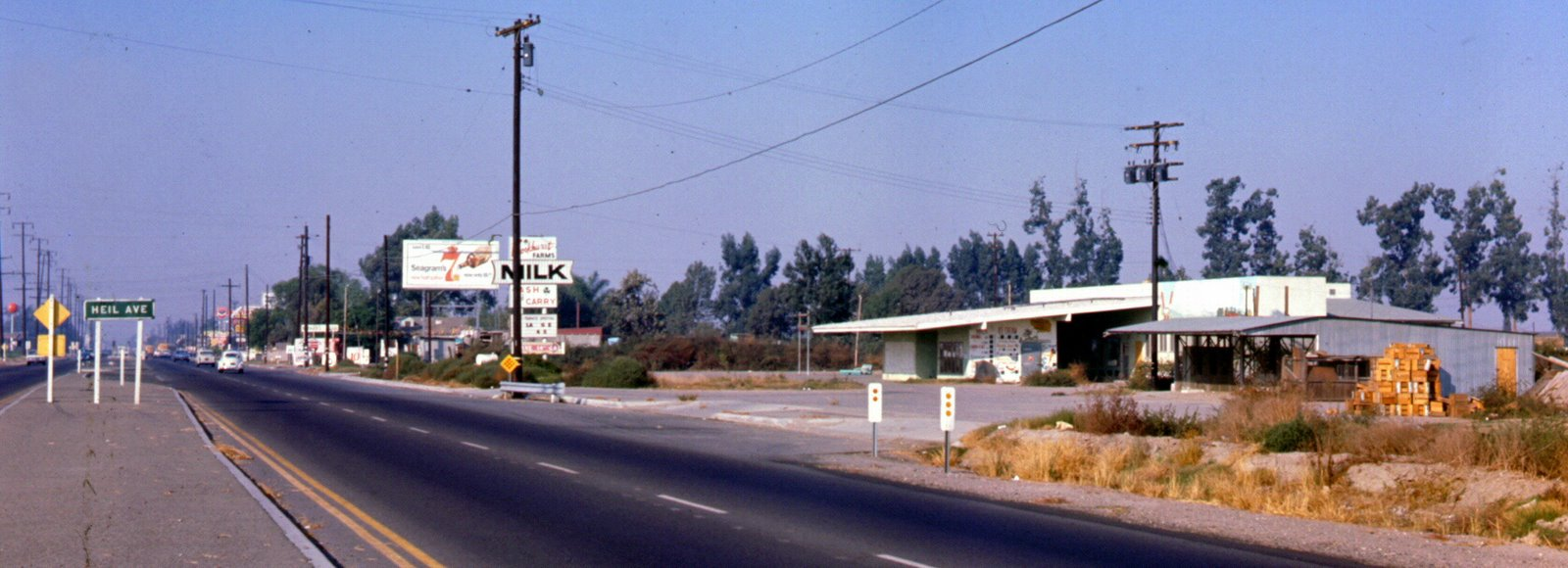
Harbor Blvd at Heil Ave, 1960s

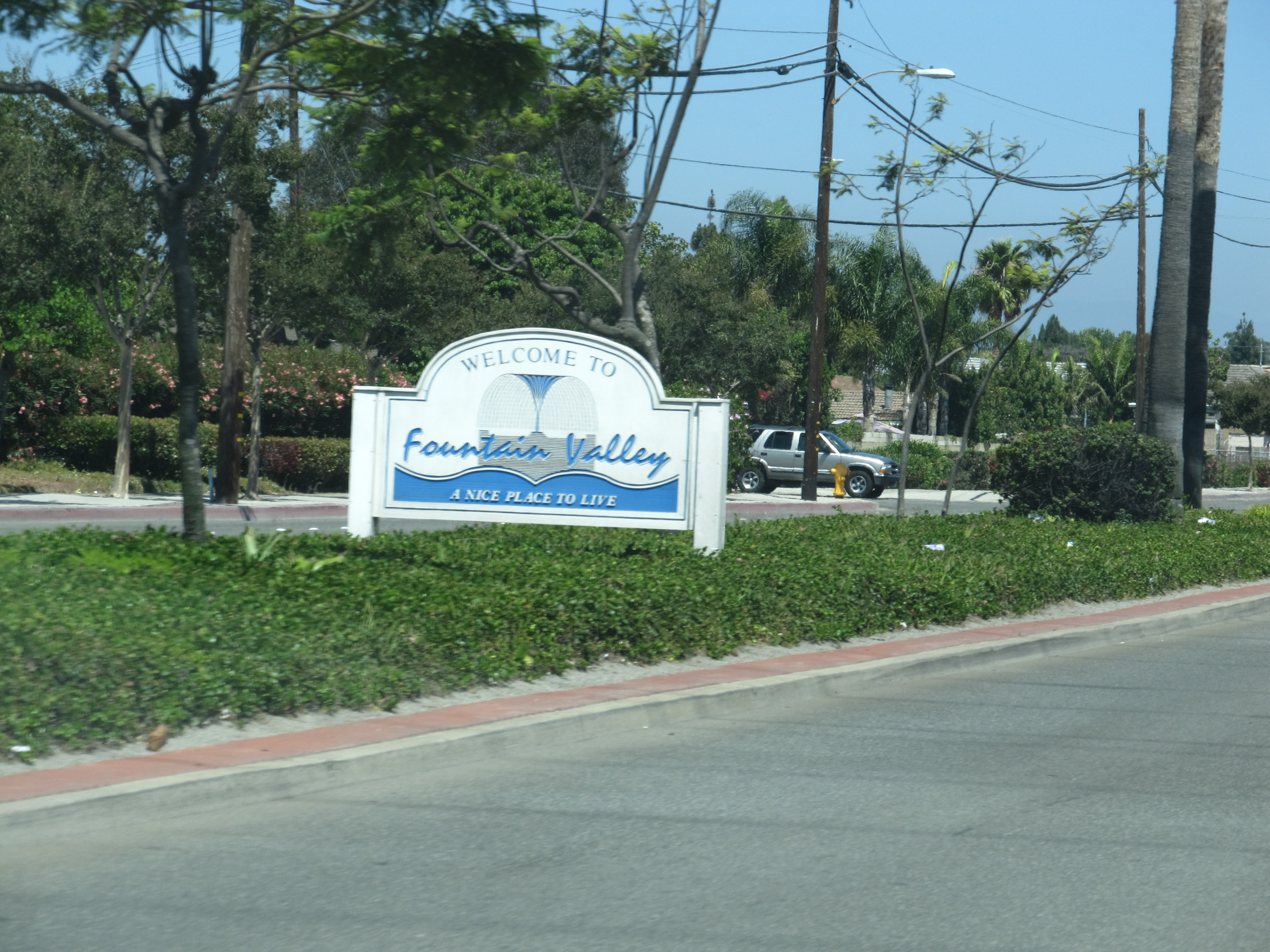
Fountain Valley welcome sign along Warner Avenue

=== Indigenous ===
The Indigenous people of the Fountain Valley area are the Tongva. The closest village to present-day site of the city was the village of Pasbenga. The village was part of a series of villages along what the Spanish would refer to as the Santa Ana River.

=== Spanish ===
European settlement of the area began when Manuel Nieto was granted the land for Rancho Los Nietos, later Rancho Las Bolsas, which encompassed over 300,000 acres (1,200 km^{2}), including present-day Fountain Valley. Control of the land was subsequently transferred to Mexico upon independence from Spain, and then to the United States as part of the Treaty of Guadalupe Hidalgo.

=== Talbert ===
Talbert was a settlement at what is now the intersection of Talbert and Bushard. It was also known as Gospel Swamp by residents.

Thomas B. Talbert was born outside Monticello in Piatt County, Illinois, in 1878. When Talbert was 13, his family moved to Long Beach, California. Around 1896, the family purchased more than 300 acres (120 ha) of peat and swampland in what is now Fountain Valley. The Talberts opened a general store and thus the settlement of Talbert was established.

The area was full of farms growing beets that were processed at some of the nation's largest plants at Huntington Beach (Holly Sugar Plant) and at Delhi, now part of southwestern Santa Ana. The post office was established in 1899, with Thomas B. Talbert serving as the first postmaster.

The All-Saints Church is the only structure remaining from that era. The Santa Ana–Huntington Beach Line of the Pacific Electric Railway passed through Talbert and opened on July 5, 1909.

=== Incorporation ===
The city was incorporated in 1957. The name of Fountain Valley refers to the very high water table in the area at the time the name was chosen, and the many corresponding artesian wells in the area. Early settlers constructed drainage canals to make the land usable for agriculture, which remained the dominant use of land until the 1960s, when construction of large housing tracts accelerated. The first mayor of Fountain Valley was James Kanno, who with this appointment became one of the first Japanese-American mayors of a mainland United States city.

After the Fall of Saigon in 1975, there was a large influx of Vietnamese refugees settling in Fountain Valley, especially in the late 1970s and throughout the 1980s, forming a large percentage of Asian Americans in the city.

== Geography ==
The city is located southwest and northeast of the San Diego Freeway (Interstate 405), which diagonally bisects the city, and is surrounded by Huntington Beach on the south and west, Westminster and Garden Grove on the north, Santa Ana on the northeast, and Costa Mesa on the southeast. Its eastern border is the Santa Ana River.

According to the United States Census Bureau, the city has a total area of 23.4 km^{2} (9.0 sq mi), 0.14% of which is water.

== Demographics ==
Historical population
Census	Pop.	Note	%±
1960	2,068		—
1970	31,886		1,441.9%
1980	55,080		72.7%
1990	53,691		−2.5%
2000	54,978		2.4%
2010	55,313		0.6%
2020	57,047		3.1%
U.S. Decennial Census; 1860–1870 1880–1890; 1900 1910 1920; 1930 1940 1950; 1960 1970 1980; 1990 2000 2010; 2020

Fountain Valley first appeared as a city in the 1960 U.S. census as part of the North Coast census county division.

=== Racial and ethnic composition ===
Fountain Valley city, California – Racial and ethnic composition Note: the US Census treats Hispanic/Latino as an ethnic category. This table excludes Latinos from the racial categories and assigns them to a separate category. Hispanics/Latinos may be of any race.
Race / Ethnicity (NH = Non-Hispanic)	Pop 1980	Pop 1990	Pop 2000	Pop 2010	Pop 2020	% 1980	% 1990	% 2000	% 2010	% 2020
White alone (NH)	46,327	39,164	32,144	27,234	22,230	84.64%	72.94%	58.47%	49.24%	38.97%
Black or African American alone (NH)	339	485	584	473	526	0.62%	0.90%	1.06%	0.86%	0.92%
Native American or Alaska Native alone (NH)	393	247	171	127	71	0.72%	0.48%	0.31%	0.23%	0.12%
Asian alone (NH)	4,102	9,368	14,100	18,324	22,532	7.49%	17.45%	25.65%	33.13%	39.50%
Native Hawaiian or Pacific Islander alone (NH)	4,102	9,368	202	159	126	7.49%	17.45%	0.37%	0.29%	0.22%
Other race alone (NH)	226	60	129	113	234	0.41%	0.11%	0.23%	0.20%	0.41%
Mixed race or Multiracial (NH)	x	x	1,778	1,633	2,491	x	x	3.23%	2.95%	4.37%
Hispanic or Latino (any race)	3,693	4,357	5,870	7,250	8,837	6.75%	8.11%	10.68%	13.11%	15.49%
Total	54,734	53,691	54,978	55,313	57,047	100.00%	100.00%	100.00%	100.00%	100.00%

=== 2020 census ===
As of the 2020 census, Fountain Valley had a population of 57,047 and a population density of 6,288.2 inhabitants per square mile (2,427.9/km^{2}).

The age distribution was 18.6% under the age of 18, 8.6% aged 18 to 24, 22.5% aged 25 to 44, 28.6% aged 45 to 64, and 21.7% who were 65 years of age or older. The median age was 45.2 years. For every 100 females, there were 94.2 males, and for every 100 females age 18 and over there were 91.8 males age 18 and over.

The census reported that 99.4% of the population lived in households, 0.4% lived in non-institutionalized group quarters, and 0.3% were institutionalized. In total, 100.0% of residents lived in urban areas, while 0.0% lived in rural areas.

There were 19,157 households, out of which 30.7% had children under the age of 18 living in them. Of all households, 56.2% were married-couple households, 4.4% were cohabiting couple households, 25.4% had a female householder with no spouse or partner present, and 14.1% had a male householder with no spouse or partner present. About 18.7% of all households were made up of individuals, and 11.2% had someone living alone who was 65 years of age or older. The average household size was 2.96. There were 14,498 families (75.7% of all households).

There were 19,561 housing units at an average density of 2,156.2 units per square mile (832.5 units/km^{2}), of which 19,157 (97.9%) were occupied. Of these occupied units, 68.6% were owner-occupied and 31.4% were occupied by renters. The homeowner vacancy rate was 0.4%, and the rental vacancy rate was 2.8%.

=== 2023 ACS 5-year estimates ===
In 2023, the US Census Bureau estimated that 32.0% of the population were foreign-born. Of all people aged 5 or older, 53.9% spoke only English at home, 9.7% spoke Spanish, 3.2% spoke other Indo-European languages, 29.5% spoke Asian or Pacific Islander languages, and 3.7% spoke other languages. Of those aged 25 or older, 90.4% were high school graduates and 44.9% had a bachelor's degree.

The median household income was $111,797, and the per capita income was $48,238. About 3.8% of families and 7.3% of the population were below the poverty line.

=== 2010 census ===
The 2010 United States census reported that Fountain Valley had a population of 55,313. The population density was 6,124.7 inhabitants per square mile (2,364.8/km^{2}). The racial makeup of Fountain Valley was 31,225 (56.5%) White (49.2% Non-Hispanic White), 510 (0.9%) African American, 229 (0.4%) Native American, 18,418 (33.3%) Asian, 171 (0.3%) Pacific Islander, 2,445 (4.4%) from other races, and 2,315 (4.2%) from two or more races. Hispanic or Latino of any race were 7,250 persons (13.1%).

The Census reported that 54,876 people (99.2% of the population) lived in households, 257 (0.5%) lived in non-institutionalized group quarters, and 180 (0.3%) were institutionalized.

There were 18,648 households, out of which 6,341 (34.0%) had children under the age of 18 living in them, 11,142 (59.7%) were opposite-sex married couples living together, 2,102 (11.3%) had a female householder with no husband present, 970 (5.2%) had a male householder with no wife present. There were 646 (3.5%) unmarried opposite-sex partnerships, and 108 (0.6%) same-sex married couples or partnerships. 3,451 households (18.5%) were made up of individuals, and 1,772 (9.5%) had someone living alone who was 65 years of age or older. The average household size was 2.94. There were 14,214 families (76.2% of all households); the average family size was 3.34.

The population was spread out, with 11,643 people (21.0%) under the age of 18, 4,624 people (8.4%) aged 18 to 24, 13,310 people (24.1%) aged 25 to 44, 16,020 people (29.0%) aged 45 to 64, and 9,716 people (17.6%) who were 65 years of age or older. The median age was 42.6 years. For every 100 females, there were 94.9 males. For every 100 females age 18 and over, there were 92.2 males.

There were 19,164 housing units at an average density of 2,122.0 per square mile (819.3/km^{2}), of which 13,458 (72.2%) were owner-occupied, and 5,190 (27.8%) were occupied by renters. The homeowner vacancy rate was 0.8%; the rental vacancy rate was 3.8%. 40,718 people (73.6% of the population) lived in owner-occupied housing units and 14,158 people (25.6%) lived in rental housing units.

According to the 2010 United States census, Fountain Valley had a median household income of $81,212, with 6.7% of the population living below the federal poverty line.

== Economy ==
As a suburban city, most of Fountain Valley's residents commute to work in other urban centers. However, in recent years, the city has seen an increase in commercial jobs in the city, with the growth of a commercial center near the Santa Ana River known as the "Southpark" district.

Although the economy of the area was once based mainly on agriculture, the remaining production consists of several fields of strawberries or other small crops, which are gradually being replaced by new office development. Efforts to bolster economic activity are evidenced by the city enacting policies to benefit small businesses, and even going so far as to paint a mural on the facade of a large water treatment building facing the freeway that depicts two shopping bags headlined by the words, "Shop in Fountain Valley."

Fountain Valley is home to the national headquarters of Hyundai Motor America and D-Link Corporation, the global headquarters of memory chip manufacturer Kingston Technology, and the corporate headquarters of Surefire, LLC, maker of military and commercial flashlights. The Southpark commercial area is also home to offices for companies such as D-Link, Starbucks, Satura and the Orange County Register. There are also a limited number of light industrial companies in this area. In addition, Fountain Valley is the location for Noritz, a tankless water heater manufacturer, and the main west coast offices of Ceridian, a professional employer organization.

The increasing commercial growth can be evidenced by the frequent rush-hour traffic bottlenecks on the San Diego (405) Freeway through Fountain Valley.

=== Top employers ===
According to the city's 2023 Annual Comprehensive Financial Report, the top ten employers in the city are:

#	Employer	# of employees
1	Orange Coast Memorial Medical Center	1,563
2	UCI Health - Fountain Valley	1,518
3	Memorial Health Services	913
4	Hyundai Motor America	749
5	Kingston Technology	609
6	Memorial Health Medical Foundation	493
7	Costco	400
8	SureFire	326
9	Spec Services, Inc.	238
10	Sam's Club	219

== Arts and culture ==
Fountain Valley holds an annual Summerfest in June in Mile Square Regional Park. The event features a car show, rides, music, and booths.

The city has 18 churches, one Reform synagogue, a mosque and a public library.

== Parks and recreation ==
Fountain Valley is home to Mile Square Regional Park, a 640-acre (2.6 km^{2}) park containing two lakes, two 18-hole golf courses, playing fields, picnic shelters, and a 20-acre (81,000 m^{2}) urban nature area planted with California native plants, a 55-acre (220,000 m^{2}) recreation center with tennis courts, basketball courts, racquetball courts, a gymnasium, and the Kingston Boys & Girls Club; There is also a community center and a 16,652-square-foot (1,547 m^{2}) senior center that opened in September 2005. A major redevelopment of the recreation center and city-administered sports fields was completed in early 2009.

== Government ==
Fountain Valley city vote by party in presidential elections
Year	Democratic	Republican	Third Parties
2024	45.96% 13,545	51.06% 15,047	2.98% 878
2020	47.11% 15,109	50.98% 16,349	1.91% 613
2016	46.85% 12,009	46.54% 11,391	6.61% 1,694
2012	41.82% 10,679	55.69% 14,219	2.49% 636
2008	42.14% 11,277	55.55% 14,864	2.31% 618
2004	30.00% 8,748	64.82% 16,678	1.19% 305
2000	37.05% 8,892	59.12% 14,191	3.83% 920
1996	36.05% 8,169	53.88% 12,209	10.07% 2,282
1992	29.20% 7,672	46.32% 12,169	24.48% 6,432
1988	28.54% 6,834	70.39% 16,855	1.07% 257
1984	20.90% 4,922	78.25% 18,426	0.85% 201
1980	20.16% 4,537	70.77% 15,928	9.07% 2,042
1976	32.22% 6,522	66.19% 13,401	1.59% 322

In the California State Legislature, Fountain Valley is in the 36th senatorial district, represented by Republican Tony Strickland, and in the 70th Assembly district, represented by Republican Tri Ta.

In the United States House of Representatives, Fountain Valley is in California's 45th congressional district, represented by Democrat Derek Tran.

=== Politics ===
Fountain Valley is a reliably Republican city in presidential elections; however, former Secretary of State Hillary Rodham Clinton won a plurality of the city in 2016, becoming the first Democrat in over four decades to carry the municipality. However, in 2020, the city moved back into the Republican column, as Donald Trump carried the city with 51.0% of the vote, having made gains in Orange County's Vietnamese community.

According to the California Secretary of State, as of February 10, 2025, Fountain Valley has 39,115 registered voters. Of those, 15,249 (38.99%) are registered Republicans, 12,500 (31.96%) are registered Democrats, 1,440 (3.68%) are registered American Independents, 412 (1.05%) are registered Libertarians, 165 (0.42%) are registered Peace and Freedom Party Members, 138 (0.35%) are registered Green Party members, and 9,130 (23.34%) have declined to state a political party.

== Education ==
There are three high schools, three middle schools, nine elementary schools, one K-12 school, and two K-8 schools. However, some students who live in the city of Fountain Valley actually attend schools in other cities.

Fountain Valley is also home to Coastline Community College. Community colleges in the area include Orange Coast College and Golden West College, located nearby in the cities of Costa Mesa and Huntington Beach, respectively.

High schools in Huntington Beach Union High School District:

- Fountain Valley High School
- Valley Vista High School

High schools in Garden Grove Unified School District:

- Los Amigos High School

Middle schools in Fountain Valley School District:

- Harry C. Fulton Middle School
- Kazuo Masuda Middle School: Named for Kazuo Masuda, a soldier who fought in World War II and now is buried in Midway City, California.
- Talbert Middle School

Middle schools in Ocean View Middle School District:

- Vista View Middle School

Elementary schools in Garden Grove Unified School District:

- Allen Elementary School, a 2011 Blue Ribbon Award winner
- Monroe Elementary School
- Northcutt Elementary School

Elementary schools in Fountain Valley School District:

- Courreges Elementary School
- Cox Elementary School
- Gisler Elementary School
- Plavan Elementary School
- Tamura Elementary School
- Newland Elementary School
- Oka Elementary School (located in Huntington Beach)

=== Private schools ===
- Shoreline Christian School (K-8)

The Lycée International de Los Angeles previously had its Orange County campus in Fountain Valley, but it moved to Orange by 2001.

== Media ==
Fountain Valley has its own newspaper, the Fountain Valley View, operated by the Orange County Register.

== Infrastructure ==
In addition to the San Diego Freeway, which bisects the city, Fountain Valley is served by several bus lines operated by the Orange County Transportation Authority. Bus routes 33, 35, 37, 43, 70, 72, 76 and 543 cover the city's major streets.

Most of the major roads are equipped with bicycle lanes, especially around Mile Square Park, which offers wide bike paths along the major streets that mark its boundary. Dedicated bike paths along the Santa Ana River run from the city of Corona to the Pacific Ocean.

Historically, Fountain Valley had Red Car service along the Santa Ana/Huntington Beach Pacific Electric Spur Line. This line ran along Bushard Street. Passenger service started in 1909, ended in 1922, and the lines were torn out in 1930.

Fire protection and emergency medical services are provided by two stations of the Fountain Valley Fire Department. Law enforcement is provided by the Fountain Valley Police Department. Ambulance service is provided by Care Ambulance Service.

The Orange County Sanitation District's administrative offices and primary plant is located in Fountain Valley next to the Santa Ana River. The agency is the third-largest sanitation district in the western United States. Fountain Valley is also home to the offices of the Municipal Water District of Orange County, a member of the Metropolitan Water District of Southern California and of the Orange County Water District. The Orange County Water District manages the groundwater basin in central and northern Orange County and operates the Groundwater Replenishment System, the world's largest water purification plant for groundwater recharge.

Fountain Valley has two fully accredited major medical centers: the Fountain Valley Regional Hospital with 400 beds available, and Orange Coast Memorial Medical Center with 230 beds, a medical clinic, and an outpatient medical building.

== Notable people ==
- Summer Altice, model, actress, August 2000 Playboy Playmate of the Month.
- Nicholas Altobelli, musician.
- Rony Argueta, soccer player.
- Mary Astor, Academy Award for Best Supporting Actress; moved to Fountain Valley.
- Tara Lynne Barr, actress; raised in Fountain Valley.
- Jenny Benson, soccer player.
- Kenney Bertz, soccer player.
- Brian Brushwood, magician, podcaster, author, lecturer known for Scam School
- Roger H. Chen, businessman; moved to Fountain Valley.
- Don Clark, football player.
- Brandon Crouch, evangelist.
- Travis Denker, baseball player.
- Taylor Edwards, professional softball player, born in Fountain Valley
- Jack Evans, professional wrestler.
- Willie Eyre, baseball player.
- Amanda Freed, Olympic gold medal-winning softball player.
- Freddie Freeman, baseball player.
- K. J. Gerard, football player.
- Kim Gruenenfelder, writer, attended high school in Fountain Valley
- Ryan Hansen, actor.
- Carl Harry, football player.
- Mike Hessman, baseball player.
- Michael Hoyos, soccer player.
- Luke Hudson, baseball player: Kansas City Royals pitcher.
- Justin Huish, Olympic gold medalist.
- Casey Janssen, baseball player.
- Duy Khánh, musician; lived in Fountain Valley.
- Chay Lapin, Olympian.
- Ken Margerum, football player, Chicago Bears and San Francisco 49ers wide receiver, San Jose State college football assistant coach
- Dan McClintock, basketball player.
- Jerry M. Patterson, U.S. House of Representatives, California's 38th congressional district (1975–1985); Resident of Fountain Valley.
- Michelle Pfeiffer, actress, graduate of Fountain Valley High School Class of 1976
- Mike Pompeo, US Secretary of State (2018–2021), Former Director of the Central Intelligence Agency (2017–18)
- Isiah Robertson, NFL player, Los Angeles Rams; lived in Fountain Valley.
- Keri Russell, actress.
- Art Satherley, record producer.
- Nick Scandone, Paralympian.
- Aaron Schoenke, actor, screenwriter, director, editor, producer, cinematographer.
- M. Shadows, lead singer of Avenged Sevenfold
- Andre Sommersell, football player.
- Vai Taua, football player.
- Dale Thayer, baseball player.
- Chris Tillman, baseball player.
- Brian Van Holt, actor, graduate of Fountain Valley High School Class of 1987
- Craig Wilson, baseball player.
- C. J. Wilson, baseball player.
- Beau Wirick, actor.
- Chung Yong Taek, martial artist; lived in Fountain Valley.
- Tom McEwen, drag racer, lived in Fountain Valley.
- Lilia Vu, professional golfer
- Laura Yeager, U.S. Army general, grew up in Fountain Valley.
