= Fountain Valley School District =

School district in California

Address
- 10055 Slater Avenue Fountain Valley, California, 92708; United States

District information
- Type: Public
- Grades: K–8
- NCES District ID: 0614220

Students and staff
- Students: 6,165 (2020–2021)
- Teachers: 242.48 (FTE)
- Staff: 283.27 (FTE)
- Student–teacher ratio: 25.42:1

Other information
- Website: www.fvsd.us

Fountain Valley School District is a district of ten schools located in Fountain Valley, California. Former school Fred Moiola Elementary School (a K-8 school) was closed in 2012.

== Schools ==
=== Elementary schools ===
- Roch Courreges Elementary
- James H. Cox Elementary
- Robert Gisler Elementary
- Isojira Oka Elementary
- William T. Newland Elementary
- Urbain H. Plavan Elementary
- Hisamatsu Tamura Elementary School

=== Middle schools ===
- Harry C. Fulton Middle School
- Kazuo Masuda Middle School
- Samuel E. Talbert Middle School
