= Marilyn Jorgenson Reece =

American civil engineer (1926–2004)

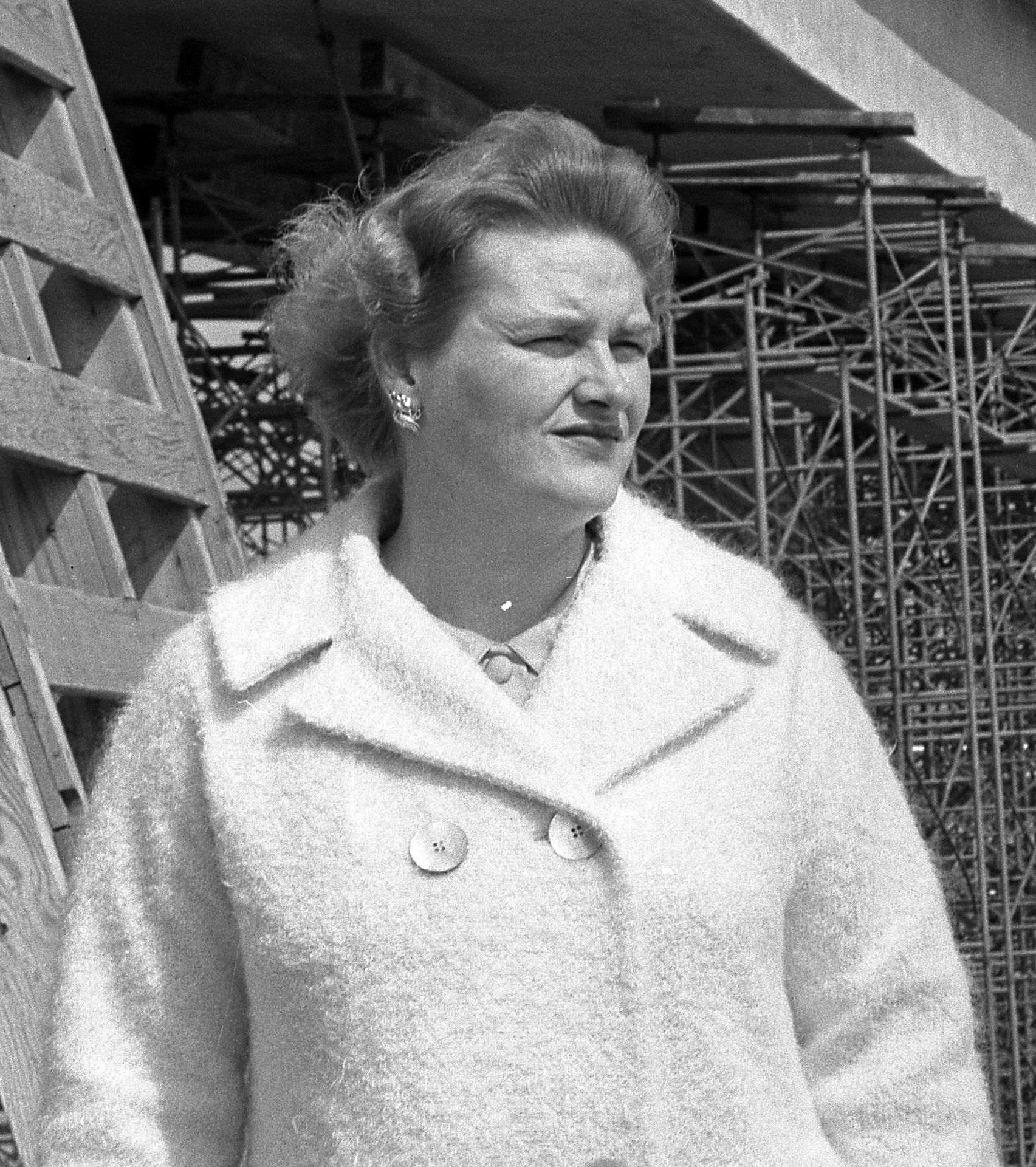
- Reece in 1964
- Born: September 8, 1926; Kenmare, North Dakota, U.S.
- Died: May 15, 2004 (aged 77); Hacienda Heights, California, U.S.
- Education: Bachelor's of Science in Civil Engineering, University of Minnesota
- Known for: first female registered engineer in the state of California
- Spouse: Alvin Reece
- Children: Kirsten Reece Stahl and Anne Reece Bartolotti
- Parent(s): Virgil and Marion Jorgenson

Marilyn Jorgenson Reece (September 8, 1926 – May 15, 2004) was an American civil engineer, and the first woman to be licensed as a civil engineer by the state of California. She designed an innovative interchange in the 1960s that handled fast moving traffic in Los Angeles. The interchange is now named after her.

== Early life ==
Marilyn Jorgensen was born on September 8, 1926, in Kenmare, North Dakota, to Virgil and Marion Jorgenson. She was of Danish descent.

== Education ==
She attended Shakopee High School in Minnesota, graduating in the class of 1944 as the salutatorian.

She received a degree in civil engineering from the University of Minnesota in 1948. Following graduation, she moved to California, and began working for the State Division of Highways. In 1954 she became the first woman to be a registered civil engineer in the state of California.

== Career ==
Among the many many projects that she supervised, her most celebrated work is the iconic interchange between the 10 and the 405 freeways in Los Angeles, California. This interchange was designed to accommodate traffic moving at high speeds, and represented the forefront of traffic engineering in its day, opening in 1964. For this work she was awarded the Governor's Design Excellence Award from Pat Brown, and in 2008, this interchange was named in her honor.

== Personal life ==
She was married to Alvin Reece, who also worked as a civil engineer for Caltrans. They had two daughters, Kirsten Reece Stahl (who became a civil engineer) and Anne Reece Bartolotti (who became an Information Technology Project Manager). Alvin died in 2015 and Kirsten died unexpectedly in 2018.

She died on May 15, 2004, in Hacienda Heights, California.
