= California State Route 55 =

Highway in California

State Route 55
- SR 55 highlighted in red

Route information
- Maintained by Caltrans
- Length: 17.807 mi (28.658 km)
- Existed: 1964–present

Major junctions
- South end: Via Lido in Newport Beach
- SR 1 in Newport Beach; SR 73 in Costa Mesa; I-405 in Costa Mesa; I-5 in Tustin; SR 22 in Orange
- North end: SR 91 in Anaheim

Location
- Country: United States
- State: California
- Counties: Orange

Highway system
- State highways in California; Interstate; US; State; Scenic; History; Pre‑1964; Unconstructed; Deleted; Freeways
← SR 54	→ SR 56

State Route 55 (SR 55) is an 18-mile (30-km)-long north–south state highway that passes through suburban Orange County in the U.S. state of California. The portion of the route built to freeway standards is known as the Costa Mesa Freeway (formerly the Newport Freeway). SR 55 runs between Via Lido south of Pacific Coast Highway (SR 1) in Newport Beach and the Riverside Freeway (SR 91) in Anaheim to the north, intersecting other major Orange County freeways such as SR 22, SR 73, and Interstate 405 (I-405).

SR 55 was first added to the state highway system in 1931, known as part of Legislative Route 43, and was routed on surface streets. It was renumbered SR 55 in 1959, and the construction of the freeway portion began in the 1960s and continued until 1992. Due to congestion, several alternatives are being discussed to expand the freeway portion past its current end in Newport Beach. SR 55 received the first carpool lane in Orange County in 1985, and the first direct carpool ramp in 1995.

== Route description ==
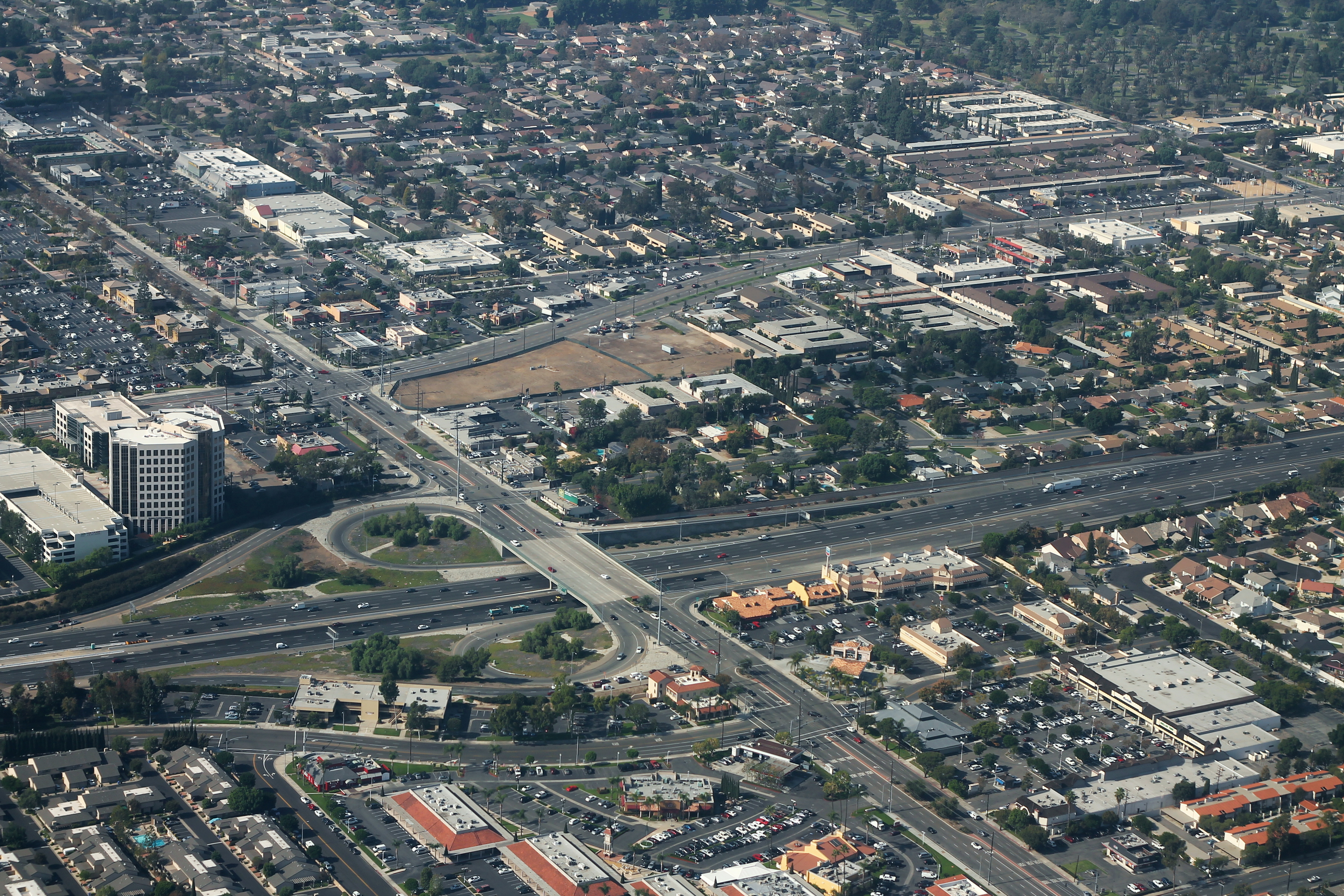
Route 55 interchange with 17th Street in Santa Ana and Tustin

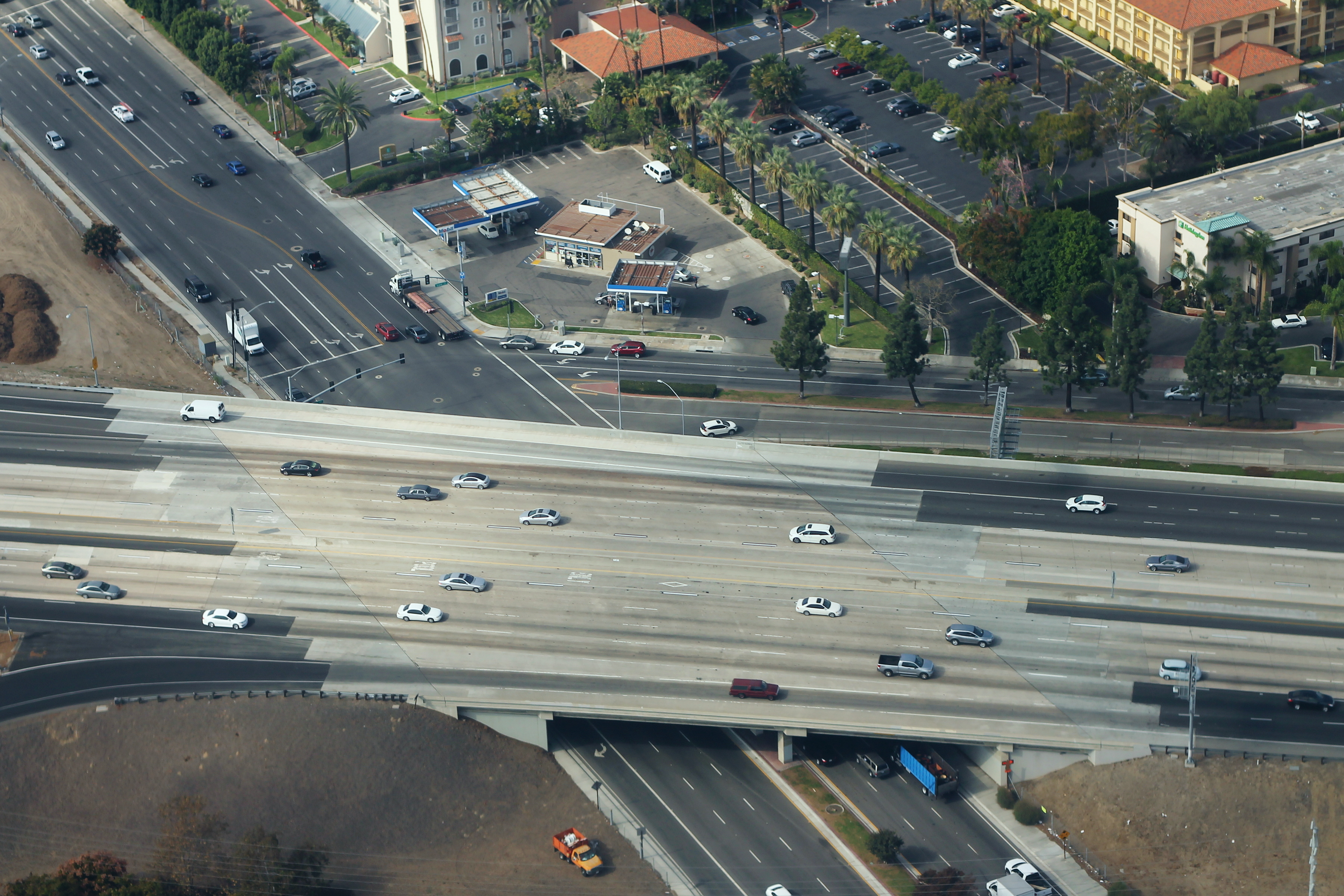
Interchange with Dyer Road

Route 55 is defined in section 355, subdivision (a), of the California Streets and Highways Code, and that the highway is "from the south end of Newport Beach Channel Bridge to Route 91 in Santa Ana Canyon". While control of the former southern end of Route 55 was relinquished by the state to the city of Newport Beach, section 355 subdivision (b) further mandates that the city must still "maintain within its jurisdiction signs directing motorists to the continuation of Route 55".

Starting at Via Lido on Newport Boulevard in Newport Beach, 0.3 miles (0.48 km) south of SR 1, SR 55 (Newport Boulevard) is a four-lane expressway for approximately 0.75 miles (1.21 km) to its intersection with 17th Street in Costa Mesa. It then follows a traditional street routing through a retail and commercial section of Costa Mesa until its intersection with 19th Street. The segment on Newport Boulevard includes a limited-access interchange at SR 1. Following the 19th Street intersection, SR 55 becomes an eight-lane below-grade freeway that bisects the northbound and southbound lanes of Newport Boulevard until the Mesa Drive undercrossing.

North of Fair Drive, SR 55 is an at-grade or above-grade freeway, with the exception of a 1 mile (1.6 km) stretch between the 1st Street/4th Street exit and the 17th Street exit in Santa Ana, which is below-grade. SR 55 intersects SR 73 and I-405 next to John Wayne Airport. The freeway continues north into Santa Ana and Tustin, where there is an interchange with I-5. Southbound SR 55 does not have a direct link to northbound I-5, and instead the southbound exit 11B/4th Street ramp has "To I-5 north" signs instructing drivers to make the connection.

SR 55 continues north into Orange, where it meets the eastern terminus of SR 22. Following this, the freeway continues almost due north until reaching its northern terminus at SR 91 near the Santa Ana River. After the last exit, Lincoln Avenue and Nohl Ranch Road, there is an entrance to the 91 Express Lanes from the HOV lane.

Today, SR 55 is a heavily travelled corridor linking southern Orange County with SR 91, the main corridor between the Inland Empire and the Los Angeles Metropolitan Area, as well as I-5, the main north–south corridor for California. An HOV lane has been built along the entire freeway portion from I-405 to SR 91, with some direct access ramps, including one for I-5. However, congestion is still very prevalent throughout the day, as is the norm with many Orange County freeways; Route 55 experiences a peak daily traffic volume of 262,000 vehicles and 17,292 trucks.

SR 55 is part of the California Freeway and Expressway System, and is part of the National Highway System, a network of highways that are considered essential to the country's economy, defense, and mobility by the Federal Highway Administration. SR 55 from SR 91 to Costa Mesa is known as the Costa Mesa Freeway, as named by Assembly Concurrent Resolution 177, Chapter 86 in 1976.

== History ==
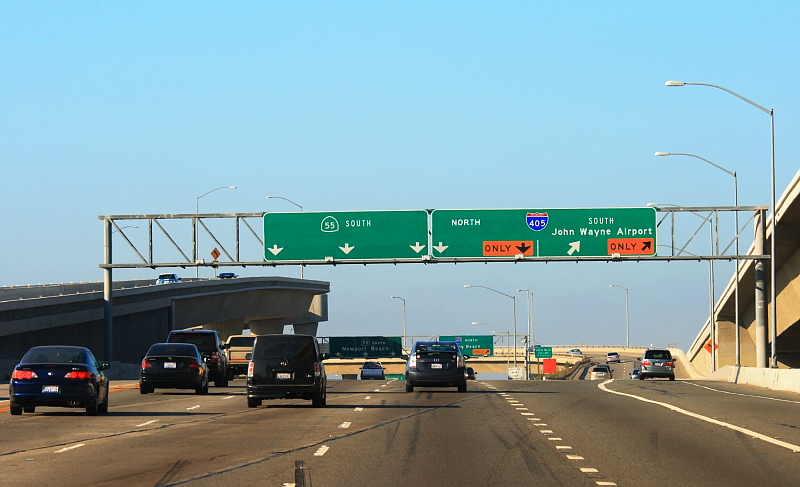
SR 55 southbound at I-405 interchange in Costa Mesa

SR 55 was built in 1931 broadly following the route of the Santa Ana and Newport Railway and originally numbered Route 43. It was built from the southern terminus of SR 1 (the Pacific Coast Highway, or "PCH") and continued northbound on roughly the same route it follows today, following Newport Road (today Newport Boulevard) northeast to Tustin, and then Tustin Avenue north to near its current terminus at SR 91. From here, Route 43 continued east on what is now SR 91 towards Riverside. In 1959, the highway was renumbered as Route 55, and its route was shortened from Route 1 to the also-renumbered Route 91. The freeway portion from Chapman Avenue to SR 91 opened on January 18, 1962, at a cost of $4.6 million (equivalent to $37.4 million in 2025). The segment between SR 73 and Chapman Avenue opened in 1966.

SR 55 was the first freeway in Orange County to receive carpool lanes, opened in October 1985 between I-405 and SR 91. The stretch of SR 55 between Mesa Drive and 19th Street in Costa Mesa was opened in 1992; plans to extend SR 55 freeway south from 19th Street to State Route 1 were never realized due to community opposition, fueling an amendment to the city charter to prevent this extension.

In 1995, the direct carpool lane ramps between I-5 and SR 55 were completed; these were the first in Orange County. The year also saw further widening of SR 55 between SR 22 and McFadden Avenue. Between 1996 and 2002, the fifth lane in both directions was constructed between I-5 and SR 91, funded with a sales tax of half a cent approved by Measure M. In April 2007, the Orange County Transportation Authority approved funds to study the feasibility of extending the Costa Mesa Freeway south to 17th Street via tunnels or flyover ramps. The segment of SR 55 from Finley Street to the Newport Channel bridge was legally authorized to be turned over to the city of Newport Beach in 2009.

In the mid 2000s, Caltrans began adding the city of Anaheim as a control city on State Route 55 North. Signs that mention State Route 55 North would have the newer reflective posting pasted over the button sign or would be replaced with a new one that says "Anaheim/Riverside" to reflect this change.

SR 55 was formerly called the Newport Freeway. In 2010, the stretch between Chapman and Katella Avenues in the City of Orange was renamed the Paul Johnson Freeway for longtime local radio and television traffic reporter Paul Johnson, who died the same year.

On May 21, 2021, a road rage incident occurred in which the perpetrator fatally shot 6-year-old Aiden Leos, a passenger in his mother's car as it was traveling on the 55 Freeway. On June 6, Marcus Anthony Eriz and Wynne Lee were arrested in connection with the death. Both suspects pleaded not guilty in court on June 18.

== Exit list ==
The entire route is in Orange County.

Location	mi	km	Exit	Destinations	Notes
Newport Beach	0.00	0.00	—	Newport Boulevard south	Continuation beyond Finley Avenue
Newport Beach	0.00	0.00	—	Finley Avenue	Original southern terminus of SR 55 (Note: Miles and exit numbers are measured from SR 55's original southern end at Finley Avenue, before the segment between Finley Avenue and Via Lido was legally authorized to be deleted and relinquished to local control in 2009.)
Newport Beach	0.10	0.16	—	Via Lido	South end of state maintenance
Newport Beach	0.27	0.43	1	SR 1 (Pacific Coast Highway) – Laguna Beach, Huntington Beach, Long Beach	
Costa Mesa	1.87	3.01	2	Newport Boulevard north, Harbor Boulevard	South end of freeway; northbound exit and southbound entrance
Costa Mesa	2.77	4.46	3	Victoria Street, 22nd Street	
Costa Mesa	4.02	6.47	4	Del Mar Avenue, Fair Drive	
Costa Mesa	4.74	7.63	5A	SR 73 south (Corona del Mar Freeway) – San Diego via toll road	SR 73 north exits 17A-B
Costa Mesa	4.74	7.63	5B	SR 73 north (Corona del Mar Freeway) to I-405 north (San Diego Freeway) – Long Beach	Northbound exit and southbound entrance; SR 73 south exit 17A
Costa Mesa	4.74	7.63	5C	Baker Street	Signed as exit 5B southbound
Costa Mesa	5.99	9.64	6A	I-405 north (San Diego Freeway) – Long Beach	Southbound exit and northbound entrance; northbound access is via exit 5B; I-405 south exit 9A
Costa Mesa	5.99	9.64	6B	I-405 south (San Diego Freeway) – San Diego, John Wayne Airport	Signed as exit 6 northbound; I-405 north exit 9A
Costa Mesa			♦	I-405 south	HOV access only; southbound exit and northbound entrance
Costa Mesa			♦	I-405 north	HOV access only; southbound exit and northbound entrance
Irvine–Santa Ana line	6.99	11.25	7	MacArthur Boulevard, Main Street	
Santa Ana	7.85	12.63	8	Dyer Road	Signed as exits 8A (east) and 8B (west) southbound
Santa Ana–Tustin line	9.44	15.19	9	Edinger Avenue	
Santa Ana–Tustin line	9.96	16.03	10A	McFadden Avenue	Signed as exit 10 southbound; northbound entrance to be reconfigured to feed into northbound I-5 only
Tustin	9.96	16.03	♦	I-5 north – Santa Ana	HOV access only; northbound exit and southbound entrance
Tustin	9.96	16.03	10B	I-5 north (Santa Ana Freeway) – Santa Ana	Northbound exit and southbound entrance; southbound access is via exit 11B; I-5 south exit 103
Tustin	10.98	17.67	11A	I-5 south (Santa Ana Freeway) – San Diego	I-5 north exits 103A-B
Santa Ana–Tustin line	10.98	17.67	11B	4th Street to I-5 north / Irvine Boulevard	“To I-5” is not signed northbound
Santa Ana–Tustin line	11.79	18.97	12	17th Street	Signed as exits 12A (east) and 12B (west) southbound
Orange	12.97	20.87	13	SR 22 west (Garden Grove Freeway) – Long Beach	SR 22 east exits 17B-C
Orange	13.70	22.05	14	Chapman Avenue (CR S25 east)	Signed as exits 14A (east) and 14B (west) northbound
Orange	15.24	24.53	15	Katella Avenue (CR S18 south) – Villa Park	
Orange	16.98	27.33	17	Lincoln Avenue, Nohl Ranch Road	
Anaheim	17.83	28.69	18A	SR 91 west (Riverside Freeway) – Los Angeles	Northern terminus of SR 55; SR 91 exit 34
Anaheim	17.83	28.69	—	91 Express Lanes east	Northern terminus of SR 55; SR 91 exit 34
Anaheim	17.83	28.69	18B	SR 91 east (Riverside Freeway) – Anaheim, Riverside	Northern terminus of SR 55; SR 91 exit 34
1.000 mi = 1.609 km; 1.000 km = 0.621 mi: Electronic toll collection; HOV only; Incomplete access
