= Orange Coast Memorial Medical Center =

- MemorialCare

Geography
- Location: Fountain Valley, California, United States
- Coordinates: 33.70008°N 117.9549°W

Services
- Beds: 240

Links
- Website: www.memorialcare.org
- Lists: Hospitals in California

Orange Coast Memorial Medical Center (OCMMC) is a 240-bed community hospital in Fountain Valley, California. It is part of the four MemorialCare medical centers, located in Orange and Los Angeles counties. The 14 bed paramedic receiving Emergency Department has received awards that include CEP's Emergency Department of the Year for 2000 and was recognized as “Best in State” by Parkside Surveys in 1999 for physician care and waiting times. Their 100 percent Board certified staff average over 15 years in full-time practice.

== Services ==
- General medical and surgical care
- General intensive care
- Cardiology department
- Neurology department
- Obstetrics
- Orthopedics department
- Emergency department
