= List of smoking bans in the United States =

Statewide smoking bans in the United States as of 2018:
No ban
Banned in restaurants
Banned in restaurants and bars
Banned in non-hospitality workplaces
Banned in restaurants and non-hospitality workplaces
Banned in all workplaces
*Many localities impose stricter rules than state law.
*Map only reflects bans in indoor spaces.

Smoking bans are public policies, including criminal laws and occupational safety and health regulations, that prohibit tobacco smoking in certain spaces. The United States Congress has not attempted to enact any type of nationwide federal smoking ban in workplaces and public places. Therefore, such policies are entirely a product of state and local laws.

Utah was the first state to enact a comprehensive statewide ban on smoking in public places, with the state Legislature passing the Utah Indoor Clean Air Act in 1994. Similarly, California enacted a statewide smoking ban for restaurants that went into effect in 1995. Throughout the early to mid-2000s, especially between 2004 and 2007, an increasing number of states enacted a statewide smoking ban of some kind. As of 2018, the most recent statewide smoking ban is Alaska's, which was signed into law on July 18 and went into effect on October 1.

As further detailed in this list, smoking laws vary widely throughout the United States. Some places in the United States do not generally regulate smoking at all, some ban smoking in certain areas and not others, and some ban smoking nearly everywhere, even in outdoor areas (no state bans smoking in all public outdoor areas, but some local jurisdictions do). As of October 1, 2021, according to the American Nonsmokers' Rights Foundation, 82.1% of the U.S. population lives under a ban on smoking in "workplaces, and/or restaurants, and/or bars, by either a state, commonwealth, or local law", and 62.3% live under a ban covering all workplaces, restaurants, and bars. A smoking ban (either state or local) has been enacted covering all bars and restaurants in each of the 60 most populated cities in the United States except these ten: Henderson, Jacksonville, Las Vegas, Memphis (no smoking in restaurants, government buildings and most indoor public places), Miami, Oklahoma City, Philadelphia, Tampa, Tulsa, and Virginia Beach.

== Overview ==
=== Statewide bans on smoking in all enclosed public places ===
As of July 2018, 29 states have enacted statewide bans on smoking in all enclosed workplaces, including all bars and restaurants: Alaska, Arizona, California, Colorado, Connecticut, Delaware, Hawaii, Illinois, Iowa, Kansas, Maine, Maryland, Massachusetts, Michigan, Minnesota, Montana, Nebraska, New Jersey, New Mexico, New York, North Dakota, Ohio, Oregon, Rhode Island, South Dakota, Utah, Vermont, Washington, and Wisconsin. Ten other states have enacted statewide smoking bans but have carved out an exception for certain establishments and workplaces: Arkansas, Florida, Idaho, Indiana, Louisiana, Nevada, New Hampshire, North Carolina, Pennsylvania, and Tennessee.

However, these states exempt a variety of places from their respective smoking bans. All except seven (California, Delaware, Montana, North Dakota, Utah, Vermont, and Washington) exempt tobacconists. All except six (Alaska, Michigan, Indiana, North Dakota, Vermont, and Wisconsin) allow hotels and motels to designate a certain percentage of smoking rooms. Many also exempt or do not cover casinos (10), private clubs (8), cigar bars (14), or certain small workplaces (8). The following is a table of common exemptions from these 28 states' smoking bans:

States that exempt tobacconists	States that exempt cigar bars	States that exempt private clubs	States that exempt casinos	States that exempt small workplaces
AK, AZ, CA, CO, CT, HI, KS, IL, IA, ME, MD, MA, MI, MN, NE, NJ, NM, NY, OH, OR, RI, SC, SD, TN, WI	AK, CA, CO, CT, MA, MI, NE, NJ, NM, NY, OR, RI, SD, TN, WI	AK, AZ, CT, IA, KS, MA, NY, OH, TN	CT, IA, KS, ME, TN (OTB parlors, beano and bingo halls), MI, MN, NJ (including OTB parlors), NV, NM, RI (including OTB parlors), WI	CO & TN (three or fewer employees), ID (five or fewer employees), ND (one employee), NM (one employee), OH (family owned and operated), UT (one employee), VT (one employee)

In Connecticut, Florida, Montana, North Carolina, Oklahoma, Pennsylvania, Utah, Virginia, and Wisconsin, the state law preempts local governments from enacting stricter smoking bans than the state, though some cities and counties in some of those states have enacted local versions of the state's smoking ban. In the other 23 states with a statewide general smoking ban, some cities and counties have enacted stricter local smoking bans to varying degrees. In California, Connecticut, Delaware, Hawaii, Maine, New Jersey, North Dakota, Oregon, Utah, and Vermont, usage of e-cigarettes is prohibited indoors. The strictest smoking ban in the United States is in Calabasas, California, where smoking anywhere a non-smoker could congregate, including public sidewalks and apartment complexes, is a misdemeanor punishable by a fine of at least $250.

=== Statewide smoking bans exempting adult-only venues ===
As of July 2017, five states ban smoking in most enclosed public places, but permit adult venues such as bars (and casinos, if applicable) to allow smoking if they choose: Florida, Idaho, Indiana, Louisiana, and Nevada. In Florida, state law preempts local governments from enacting stricter smoking bans than the state, though in Idaho, Indiana, and Louisiana, some cities and counties have enacted stricter local smoking bans to varying degrees, in some cases banning it in all enclosed workplaces. See individual state listings below for details.

=== Unique statewide smoking bans ===
As of July 2018, four states have enacted smoking bans in particular places that do not fit in the other categories:

- Alaska bans smoking in all enclosed workplaces, including bars and restaurants, but allows smoking in private clubs that were in existence prior to January 1, 2017, and allows for certain localities such as villages to opt out of the law; local governments in Alaska can regulate smoking more strictly than the state.
- Nevada generally bans smoking in all public places and places of employment, but exempts bars, casinos, strip clubs, brothels, and retail tobacco stores, and restaurants that do not allow patrons under 21 years of age. In all other restaurants, smoking is relegated to separately ventilated designated smoking areas. Local governments in Nevada may regulate smoking more strictly than the state.
- New Hampshire bans smoking in restaurants and some bars (those besides cigar bars and private clubs), schools, and certain common areas open to the public, but not anywhere else, and state law prohibits local governments from enacting local smoking bans.
- North Carolina bans smoking in all restaurants and bars (excluding cigar bars and private clubs), as well as government buildings and vehicles, but does not regulate smoking anywhere else. Local governments may regulate smoking more strictly than the state, except in cigar bars, private clubs, tobacco shops, private residences/vehicles, designated hotel/motel smoking rooms, and theatrical performances involving smoking.

=== States with no statewide smoking ban ===
As of July 2018, twelve states have not enacted any general statewide ban on smoking in workplaces, bars or restaurants: Alabama, Arkansas, Georgia, Kentucky, Mississippi, Missouri, Oklahoma, South Carolina, Texas, Virginia, West Virginia, and Wyoming. Instead, laws in most of these states (see individual state listings below for further information) require proprietors of certain places to designate smoking and non-smoking areas and post warning signage.

In Oklahoma and Virginia, state laws prohibit local governments from regulating smoking more strictly than the state, making those states among the fewest in the nation without any legislated smoking bans. In the other ten states, cities and counties have enacted stricter smoking laws than the state, in some cases banning smoking in all enclosed workplaces. In Alabama and Mississippi, the state smoking law expressly allows all local governments to do so. In Kentucky, Missouri, South Carolina, Texas, and West Virginia, a court has ruled that certain local governments have the power to do so. See the individual state listings below for details.

=== Smoking laws and non-states ===
In the District of Columbia, American Samoa, Puerto Rico and the United States Virgin Islands, smoking is banned in all enclosed public places, including bars and restaurants. Guam prohibits smoking in restaurants, but the ban does not extend to workplaces or any other businesses. The Northern Mariana Islands prohibits smoking in most workplaces and restaurants, but not in bars.

=== Smoking laws and the U.S. federal government ===
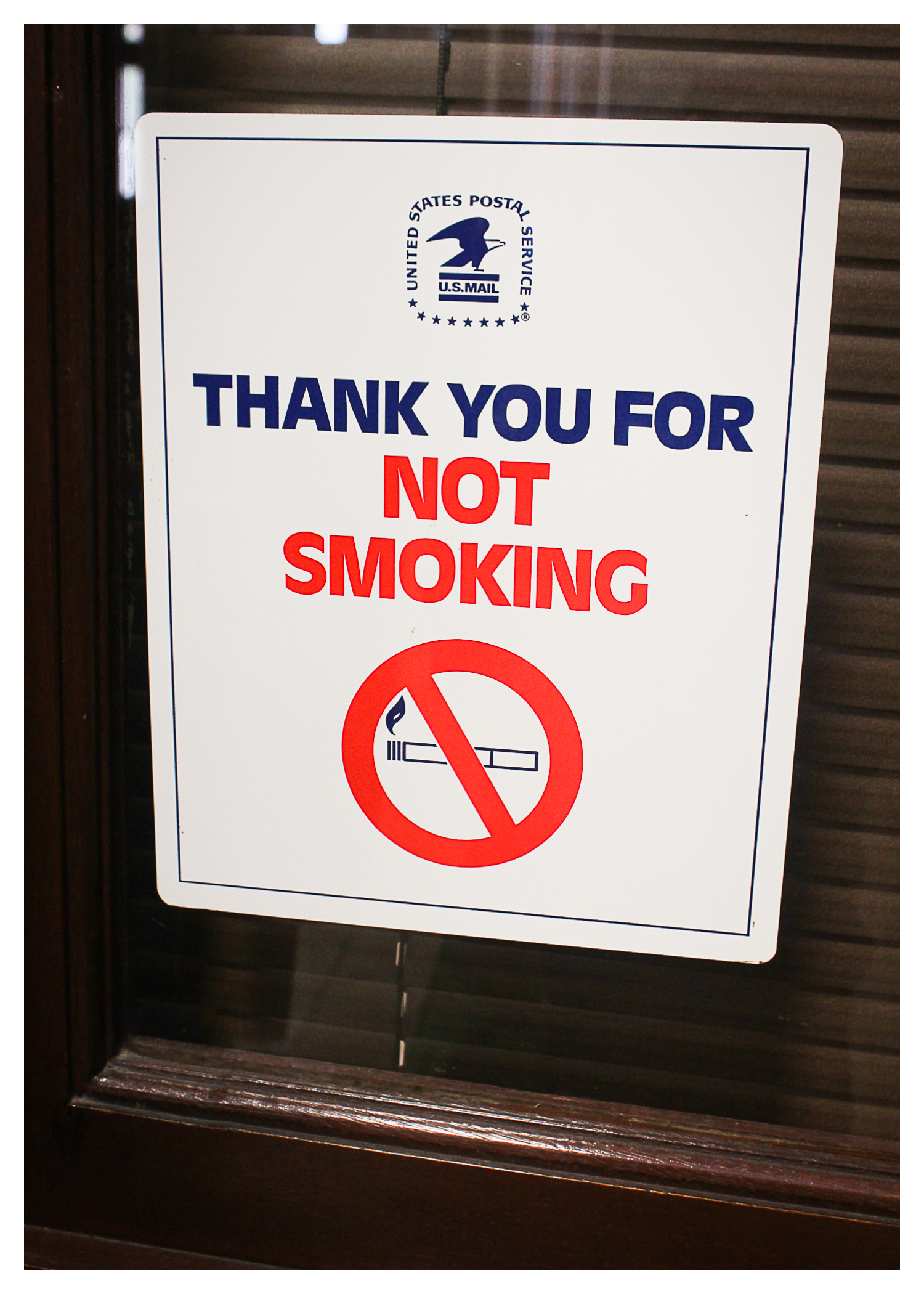
"No Smoking" sign at a United States Postal Service building

Although Congress has not attempted to enact a nationwide federal smoking ban in workplaces, several federal regulations do concern indoor smoking. Effective April 1998, inflight smoking is banned by the United States Department of Transportation on all commercial passenger flights in the United States or by American air carriers. On August 9, 1997, President Bill Clinton issued Executive Order 13058, banning smoking in all interior spaces owned, rented, or leased by the Executive Branch of the Federal Government, as well as in any outdoor areas under executive branch control near air intake ducts.

On 3 February 2017, a U.S. Department of Housing and Urban Development rule instituting smoke-free public housing took effect. The rule requires that public housing agencies prohibit the use of lit tobacco products in all living units, indoor common areas, and administrative office buildings, as well as any outdoor area within 25 feet of such buildings. On 30 July 2018, the ruling was required to be fully implementation.

== Laws by state or territory ==
=== Alabama ===
- No statewide smoking ban. Instead, Alabama's 2003 statewide smoking law, the Alabama Clean Indoor Air Act, generally prohibits smoking in public places and public meetings unless a smoking area is designated that in certain places must be "enclosed and well ventilated". Warning signs must be posted appropriately. Bars, lounges, retail tobacco stores, limousines under private hire, designated hotel/motel smoking rooms, and psychiatric facilities are entirely exempt from the Act's regulation. Local governments may regulate smoking more stringently than the Act, and the Alabama Court of Criminal Appeals reiterated this in August 2009.
- Localities in Alabama with smoking bans that include all bars and restaurants (36 total):
  - Albertville, November 12, 2010, banned in all enclosed workplaces, including bars and restaurants
  - Anniston, July 1, 2013, banned in all enclosed workplaces, including bars and restaurants
  - Atmore, November 13, 2008, banned in all enclosed workplaces, including bars and restaurants
  - Auburn, November 15, 2006, banned in bars and restaurants, but not other workplaces
  - Bayou La Batre, August 31, 2007, banned in all enclosed workplaces, including bars and restaurants
  - Birmingham, April 27, 2012, banned in all enclosed workplaces, including bars and restaurants; also includes private clubs and hotels/motels
  - Chickasaw, December 26, 2013, banned in all enclosed workplaces, including bars and restaurants
  - Citronelle, March 1, 2006, banned in all enclosed workplaces, including bars and restaurants
  - Clay, January 6, 2012, banned in all enclosed workplaces, including bars and restaurants
  - Cottonwood, December 11, 2005, banned in all enclosed workplaces, including bars and restaurants
  - Creola, April 25, 2013, banned in all enclosed workplaces, including bars and restaurants
  - Decatur, October 1, 2007, banned in all enclosed workplaces, including bars and restaurants
  - East Brewton, November 1, 2006, banned in all enclosed workplaces, including bars and restaurants
  - Fairfield, February 1, 2006, banned in bars and restaurants, but not other workplaces
  - Flomaton, June 23, 2006, banned in all enclosed workplaces, including bars and restaurants
  - Fultondale, September 1, 2011, banned in all enclosed workplaces, including bars and restaurants; also includes private clubs
  - Gadsden, January 1, 2015, banned in all enclosed workplaces, including bars and restaurants
  - Gulf Shores, August 14, 2007, banned in all enclosed workplaces, including bars and restaurants
  - Headland, May 1, 2005, banned in bars and restaurants, but not other workplaces
  - Homewood, November 19, 2015, banned in all enclosed workplaces, including bars and restaurants
  - Jasper, November 1, 2011, banned in all enclosed workplaces, including bars and restaurants; exempts private clubs that are for non-profit
  - Lanett, October 17, 2011, banned in all enclosed workplaces, including bars and restaurants
  - Luverne, April 11, 2018, banned in all enclosed workplaces, including bars and restaurants
  - Midfield, December 28, 2011, banned in all enclosed workplaces, including bars and restaurants
  - Monroeville, March 19, 2013, banned in all enclosed workplaces, including bars and restaurants
  - Mountain Brook, October 19, 2016, banned in all enclosed workplaces, including bars and restaurants
  - Orange Beach, August 9, 2007, banned in all enclosed workplaces, including bars and restaurants
  - Oxford, January 1, 2007, banned in all enclosed workplaces, including bars and restaurants
  - Phenix City, February 18, 2009, banned in all enclosed workplaces, including bars and restaurants
  - Saraland, September 22, 2016, banned in all enclosed workplaces, including bars and restaurants
  - Satsuma, August 1, 2013, banned in all enclosed workplaces, including bars and restaurants
  - Sheffield, October 31, 2018, banned in all enclosed workplaces, including bars and restaurants
  - Talladega, September 1, 2007, banned in all enclosed workplaces, including bars and restaurants
  - Tallassee, December 16, 2009, banned in all enclosed workplaces, including bars and restaurants
  - Troy, June 25, 2013, banned in all enclosed workplaces, including bars and restaurants
  - Vestavia Hills, July 25, 2012, banned in workplaces, bars, restaurants, hotels/motels, and within 20 feet (6.1 m) of entrances and exits
- Localities in Alabama with smoking bans that do not include all bars and restaurants (17 total):
  - Alexander City, January 1, 2009, banned in all enclosed workplaces, including restaurants but exempting bars
  - Bay Minette, January 1, 2008, banned in all restaurants, but not bars or other enclosed workplaces
  - Bessemer, November 1, 2012, banned in all enclosed workplaces, including restaurants but exempting bars
  - Center Point, June 25, 2006, banned in all enclosed workplaces, exempting bars and restaurants
  - Daphne, May 18, 2008, banned in all enclosed workplaces, including restaurants but exempting bars
  - Fairhope, November 20, 2006, banned in all enclosed workplaces, including restaurants but exempting bars
  - Foley, November 23, 2006, banned in all enclosed workplaces, including restaurants but exempting bars
  - Fort Payne, April 1, 2009, banned in all restaurants, but not bars or other enclosed workplaces
  - Geneva, July 4, 2007, banned in all enclosed workplaces, exempting bars and restaurants
  - Mobile, October 1, 2012, banned in all enclosed workplaces, including restaurants but exempting bars
  - Northport, October 12, 2007, banned in all restaurants, but not bars or other enclosed workplaces
  - Opelika, May 22, 2006, banned in all enclosed workplaces, including restaurants but exempting bars
  - Opp, November 1, 2006, banned in all restaurants, but not bars or other enclosed workplaces
  - Prichard, February 28, 2007, banned in all enclosed workplaces, including restaurants but exempting bars
  - Robertsdale, January 2, 2007, banned in all enclosed workplaces, including restaurants but exempting bars
  - Spanish Fort, September 15, 2009, banned in all enclosed workplaces, including restaurants but exempting bars
  - Tuskegee, June 9, 2009, banned in all enclosed workplaces, including restaurants, but exempting bars.

=== Alaska ===
- Statewide smoking ban: On October 1, 2018, after being signed into law on July 18, 2018, smoking was banned statewide in all enclosed public places, including bars, restaurants, private clubs, hotels/motels, outdoor arenas, playgrounds and parks. The law exempts (1) a vehicle that is a place of employment when the vehicle is used exclusively by one person, (2) on a vessel when the vessel is engaged in commercial fishing or sport charter fishing, (3) a private club if the private club has been in continuous operation at the same location since January 1, 2017; is not licensed to serve alcoholic beverages; and is not a place of employment, (4) at a private residence, except a private residence described in (b) of 27 section or while a health care provider is present, (5) in a stand-alone shelter if the stand-alone shelter meets the following requirements: food or drink may not be sold or served in the stand-alone shelter; and the stand-alone shelter meets the minimum distance requirements of 10 feet (3.0 m), and (6) allows smoking so long as it is not within 10 feet (3.0 m) of all places where smoking is prohibited. Localities may regulate smoking more stringently than the state, and municipalities are allowed to exempt certain bars and restaurants from the bill by popular vote.

=== American Samoa ===
- Territory-wide smoking ban. On October 20, 2010, Governor Togiola Tulafono signed into law the American Samoa Smoke Free Environment Act, a Fono (Legislature) bill passed earlier in the year. The bill went into effect on January 20, 2011.

=== Arizona ===
- Statewide smoking ban: On May 1, 2007, the Smoke Free Arizona Act (Proposition 201) went into effect after passage by 54.7% of voters the prior November, banning smoking in all enclosed workplaces and within 20 feet (6.1 m) of an entrance or exit of such a place, including bars and restaurants, only exempting private residences, retail tobacco stores, private clubs, smoking associated with American Indian religious ceremonies, outdoor patios, and stage/film/television performances. The law does not cover businesses located on Indian Reservations, as the reservations are sovereign nations; but local governments may enact stricter regulations than the state.
- Other local smoking regulations in Arizona:
  - Flagstaff, May 1, 2005, banned in all parks, cemeteries, and enclosed workplaces. Retail tobacco stores were not exempted from this city ordinance.
  - Goodyear, July 1, 2009, banned in all parks.
  - Mesa, July 1, 1996, banned in amphitheaters, stadiums, and all waiting lines (such as the ones present outside movie theaters).

=== Arkansas ===
- Statewide smoking ban excluding bars and some restaurants. The Arkansas Clean Indoor Air Act of 2006, bans smoking in most enclosed workplaces in Arkansas, exempting private residences, hotel and motel rooms designated as smoking rooms, workplaces with fewer than three employees, retail tobacco stores, designated areas in nursing homes, outdoor areas, workplaces of tobacco manufacturers (and importers and wholesalers), bars and restaurants that do not allow patrons younger than 21, and gaming floors of operations regulated by the Arkansas Racing Commission. Local governments may regulate smoking more stringently than the state law. At the same time, the Arkansas Protection from Secondhand Smoke for Children Act of 2006 went into effect, prohibiting smoking in a motor vehicle carrying a child under age six years old who weighs less than 60 pounds and is in a car seat.
- Localities in Arkansas with smoking bans that include all bars and restaurants (3 total):
  - Fairfield Bay, January 29, 2006, banned in all enclosed workplaces, including bars and restaurants
  - Helena-West Helena, November 7, 2008, banned in all enclosed workplaces, including bars and restaurants
  - Wooster, May 26, 2016, banned in all enclosed workplaces, including bars and restaurants
- Localities in Arkansas with smoking bans that do not include all bars and restaurants (3 total):
  - Fayetteville, March 11, 2004, banned in all restaurants, but not bars or other enclosed workplaces
  - Highfill, July 12, 2003, banned in all enclosed workplaces, including restaurants but exempting bars
  - Pine Bluff, July 7, 2005, banned in all restaurants, but not bars or other enclosed workplaces

=== California ===
- Statewide smoking ban: Since January 1, 1995, smoking has been banned in all enclosed workplaces in California, including bars and restaurants (bars were excluded until January 1, 1998); these following areas were exempt until June 9, 2016: meeting and banquet rooms except while food or beverage functions are taking place (including set-up, service, and clean-up activities or when the room is being used for exhibit activities), retail or wholesale tobacco shops and private smokers lounges (i.e. cigar bars), truck cabs/tractors if no nonsmoking employees are present, theatrical production sites if smoking is an integral part of the story, medical research or treatment sites if smoking is integral to the research or treatment being conducted, and patient smoking areas in long-term health care facilities.

Effective January 1, 2004, California bill AB846 bans smoking within 20 feet (6.1 m) of the entrance or operable window of a public building ("public building" means a building owned and occupied, or leased and occupied, by the state, a county, a city, a city and county, or a California Community College district.) The law also prohibits smoking in state owned vehicles.

Additionally, effective January 1, 2008, smoking in a moving vehicle while in the presence of a minor (18 years or younger) is an infraction; the charge is not serious enough to be pulled over, and only can be cited along with a stricter offense, such as a moving violation or traffic accident.

Local jurisdictions may regulate smoking more strictly than the state. Many California communities have established smoke-free registries for private residential apartment buildings, which range from complexes where smoking is entirely prohibited (whether inside private dwellings or outside) to those where certain sections of dwellings may be designated as smoking dwellings. Most California cities allow landlords to regulate smoking at will.

- Alameda, January 2, 2012, banned in commercial areas, recreation areas (parks, trails beaches, sports fields), service areas (bus stops, ticket lines, ATMs), dining areas, public event spaces, entryways, and many workplaces including 90% of hotel/motel guest rooms, small businesses with fewer than five employees, tobacco shops, hookah bars, medical research sites, work vehicles, theatrical production sites, and all outdoor worksites. On January 1, 2013, the ban expanded to include all multi-unit housing.
- Belmont, October 9, 2007, banned in parks and other public places, as well as inside apartments and condominiums.
- Berkeley, March 26, 2008, banned on all commercially zoned sidewalks, and within 20 feet (6.1 m) of a bus stop. As of May 2014, banned in apartments and condos.
- Beverly Hills, October 1, 2007, banned in all outdoor dining areas.
- Burbank, April 2007, banned in most public places including Downtown Burbank, outdoor dining & shopping areas, parks, service lines, and within 20 feet (6.1 m) of all building entrances/exits.
- Calabasas, 2006, banned in all indoor and outdoor public places, except for a handful of scattered, designated outdoor smoking areas in town. Believed to be the strictest ban in the United States.
- Davis, The Davis City Code prohibits smoking in a wide variety of locations open to the public.
- El Cajon, August 14, 2007, banned on city streets, in outdoor patios in restaurants, and outside of the local shopping mall. Anyone caught smoking in public areas will faces a fine of up to $500. The city previously outlawed smoking in parks, and also requires businesses that sell tobacco products to obtain a city license.
- El Cerrito, January 1, 2015, banned in all public places, commercial areas, and multi-unit residences and within 25 feet of any of these.
- Escondido, in 2005, increased the state prohibition on smoking within 20 feet (6.1 m) of an entrance to a public place to 80 feet (24 m) outside city-owned buildings. In 2009, the city, at the urging of local students, banned smoking in parks, city open spaces, and trails, including the parking areas for these city properties.
- Glendale, October 7, 2008, banned smoking in/on and within 20 feet (6.1 m) from: all city property (except streets and sidewalks); city vehicles and public transportation vehicles; city public transit stations; places of employment; enclosed public places; non-enclosed public places; and common areas of multi-unit rental housing. Some of the areas where smoking is prohibited are authorized to have smoking-permitted areas, subject to regulations. Also, landlords in Glendale are required to provide disclosure to a prospective renter, prior to signing a lease, as to the location of possible sources of second-hand smoke, relative to the unit that they are renting.
- Hermosa Beach, March 1, 2012, banned at all of Hermosa's outdoor dining areas, the popular Pier Plaza, the city pier, the Strand, the greenbelt parkway, and all city parks and parking lots. Smoking already is outlawed on the city-owned beach.
- Irvine has banned all smoking and vaping in all public places within the city.
- Loma Linda, July 25, 2008, banned on all sidewalks, streets, common areas in shopping centers, bus stops, parks, restaurant patios, theaters, City Hall, and 80% of motel rooms and apartment units. Exempts the federally controlled VA hospital grounds, and smoking in cars traveling in the city.
- Laguna Beach, California Bans smoking throughout the city including city beaches, parks, sidewalks, bike paths, alleys and in parking structures. The only places people are allowed to smoke are in inside homes and cars as of May 23, 2017.
- Long Beach, California bans smoking in all city parks, at or within 20 feet of bus stops, and at farmers' markets.
- Los Angeles, 2007, banned in all city parks, and, 2011, all outdoor dining areas.
- Marin County, May 23, 2012, banned in all condos and apartments, as well as all patios within residential units. Anyone caught smoking will face a $100 fine and will be sentenced to five days of community service. A second offense warrants a $300 fine and ten days of community service, and a third offense being $700 fine and fifteen days of community service. Landlords may opt out of smoking restrictions by designating 20 percent of their units reserved for smoking and may permit e-cigarettes to be used inside apartments and condos. All other outdoor areas, including bar and restaurant patios, and private homes that are not of multi-unit residences and smoking in cars are exempt from the ban.
- Oakland, bans smoking within 25 feet of an entrance, exit, window, or air intake of the building of most enclosed places where smoking is prohibited (e.g., workplaces, service areas, common areas and no-smoking units of multi-unit housing); exemption is made outside of bars provided the smoke does not enter prohibited areas. Smoking is also banned in certain unenclosed areas, including service areas (e.g., bus stops, cab stands, ATMs).
- Palm Springs, April 2011, banned smoking in all city parks.
- Pasadena, October 27, 2008, banned smoking in certain outdoor areas, including shopping malls, unenclosed areas of bars and restaurants, service waiting lines (e.g. ATMs, bus stops, etc.) and within 20 feet (6.1 m) from them, and within 20 feet (6.1 m) of doorways, windows, or ventilation areas of enclosed places where smoking is banned. Also banned smoking in multi-unit housing, owned or leased, and all public events, including the Rose Parade.
- San Diego, July 11, 2006, banned smoking at all City of San Diego beaches and parks, including all beaches from La Jolla to Sunset Cliffs.
- San Francisco, January 2005, banned smoking in all city parks. January 2013, banned smoking at all outdoor "street fairs and festivals", with exceptions for legal medical marijuana and small neighborhood block parties.
- San Jose, October 2007, banned in all city parks.
- San Luis Obispo, August 2, 1990, became the first city in the world to ban smoking in all public buildings. On January 15, 2010, the city's municipal code amendment included city parks and outdoor recreational facilities as smoke-free areas. In April 2010, City Council adopted an ordinance that bans smoking in all areas frequented by the public, with limited exceptions, including unenclosed areas at certain drinking establishments.
- Santa Barbara & Goleta, Local laws in Santa Barbara County and in the City of Goleta prohibit smoking within 30 feet of any building or area where smoking is prohibited. Ashtrays are also banned within a 30-foot smoke-free area.
- Santa Monica, 2006, banned smoking within 20 feet (6.1 m) of entrances, exits, or operable windows of a public building (such as City Hall and the courthouse); in local parks (including parking lots); on the Third Street Promenade; on local beaches; and on the Santa Monica Pier (except within designated zones).

In 2012, the California Legislature passed the following into law, California Civil Code Section 1947.5. (a) A landlord of a residential dwelling unit, as defined in Section 1940, or his or her agent, may prohibit the smoking of a cigarette, as defined in Section 104556 of the Health and Safety Code, or other tobacco product on the property or in any building or portion of the building, including any dwelling unit, other interior or exterior area, or the premises on which it is located, in accordance with this article. (b) (1) Every lease or rental agreement entered into on or after January 1, 2012, for a residential dwelling unit on property on any portion of which the landlord has prohibited the smoking of cigarettes or other tobacco products pursuant to this article shall include a provision that specifies the areas on the property where smoking is prohibited, if the lessee has not previously occupied the dwelling unit. (2) For a lease or rental agreement entered into before January 1, 2012, a prohibition against the smoking of cigarettes or other tobacco products in any portion of the property in which smoking was previously permitted shall constitute a change of the terms of tenancy, requiring adequate notice in writing, to be provided in the manner prescribed in Section 827. (c) A landlord who exercises the authority provided in subdivision (a) to prohibit smoking shall be subject to federal, state, and local requirements governing changes to the terms of a lease or rental agreement for tenants with leases or rental agreements that are in existence at the time that the policy limiting or prohibiting smoking is adopted. (d) This section shall not be construed to preempt any local ordinance in effect on or before January 1, 2012, or any provision of a local ordinance in effect on or after January 1, 2012, that restricts the smoking of cigarettes or other tobacco products. (e) A limitation or prohibition of the use of any tobacco product shall not affect any other term or condition of the tenancy, nor shall this section be construed to require statutory authority to establish or enforce any other lawful term or condition of the tenancy. (Added by Stats. 2011, Ch. 264, Sec. 2. Effective January 1, 2012.)

=== Colorado ===
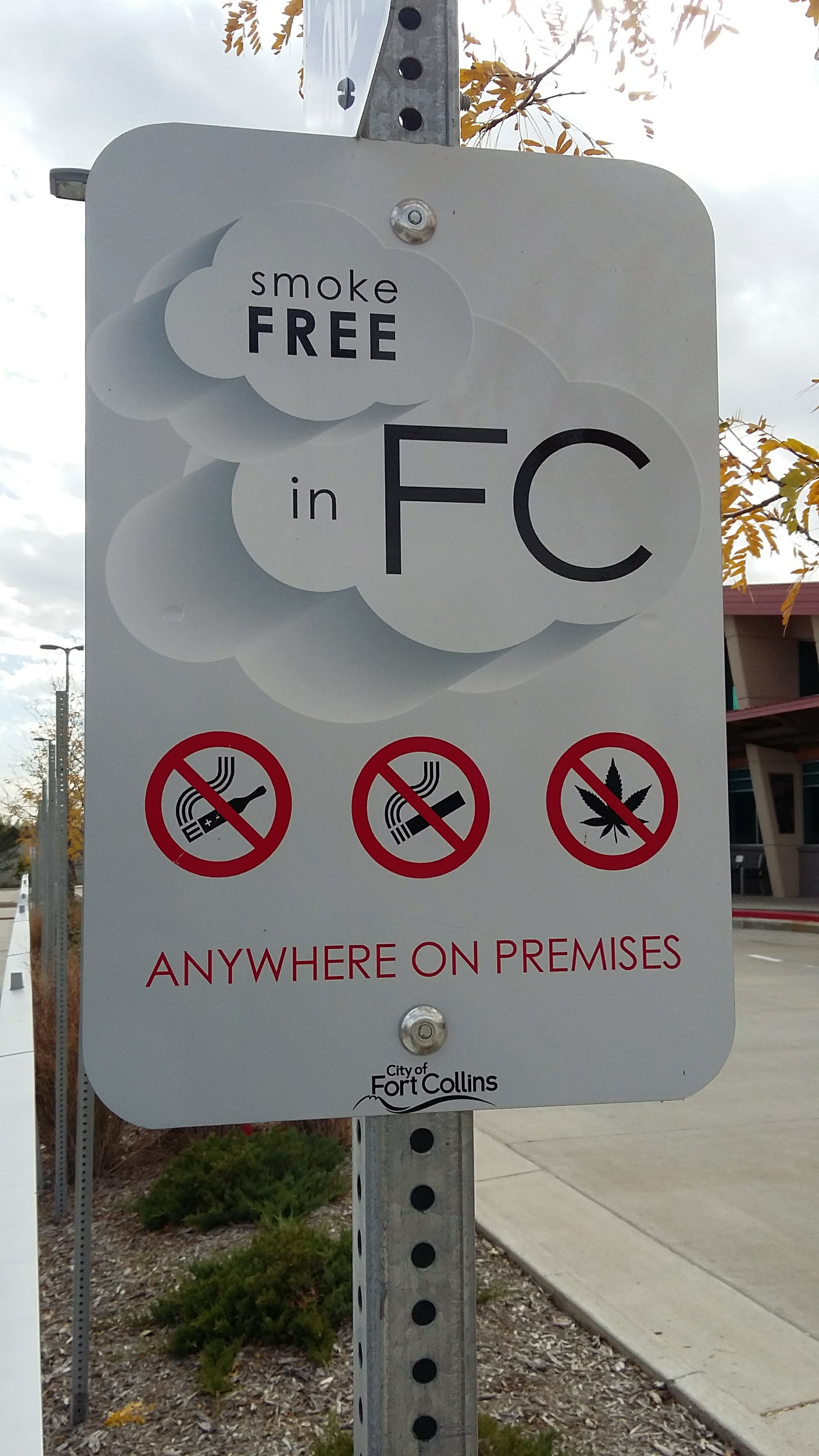
Sign at the South Transit Center in Fort Collins, informing patrons that vaping, tobacco smoking, and cannabis smoking are prohibited

- Statewide smoking ban: On July 1, 2006, the Colorado Clean Indoor Air Act went into effect, banning smoking in all enclosed workplaces statewide, including bars and restaurants. Casinos, initially exempt, were added to the ban January 1, 2008. The Act only exempts private residences and automobiles unless used for the public transportation of children or as part of healthcare or daycare, limousines under private hire, hotel/motel rooms designated as smoking rooms, retail tobacco stores, cigar bars, designated areas in airports, outdoor areas, workplaces not open to the public where the employer employs three or fewer employees, private nonresidential buildings on a farm or ranch that has annual gross income of less than $500,000, and designated areas in nursing homes. Local governments may regulate smoking more strictly than the state. A judge has ruled that a bar sharing common indoor space with a tobacco shop is also exempt from the ban.

=== Connecticut ===
- Statewide smoking ban: On October 1, 2003, the Clean Indoor Air Act went into effect, banning smoking statewide in bars and restaurants (bars, cafes, and bowling alleys were exempt until April 1, 2004). The Act exempts areas of businesses where tobacco products are developed and tested, cigar bars (a business that has a liquor permit and generated at least 10% of its 2002 gross income from on-site sales of tobacco products or humidor rentals and has not changed its size or location after December 31, 2002), and public housing projects. Prior to October 1, 2021, the Act exempted correctional and psychiatric facilities, private clubs whose liquor permit was issued on or before May 1, 2003, designated hotel rooms, separately ventilated break rooms in non-work areas of non-hospitality businesses with five or more employees, and non-hospitality businesses with fewer than five employees. Local governments are preempted from regulating smoking at all.

Two large casinos on Mohegan and Mashantucket Pequot tribal land, Mohegan Sun and Foxwoods, allow smoking in many areas of their properties.

=== Delaware ===
- Statewide smoking ban: On November 1, 2002, the Clean Indoor Air Act went into effect, banning smoking statewide in all enclosed workplaces in Delaware, including bars, restaurants, and casinos. The Act exempts private homes and automobiles not used for childcare or daycare or the public transportation of children, rented social halls while being rented, limousines under private hire, hotel/motel rooms designated as smoking rooms, fundraising activities sponsored by an ambulance or fire company while on property owned or leased by the company, and fundraising activities sponsored by a fraternal benefit society taking place upon property owned or leased by the society. Local governments can regulate smoking more strictly than the state. Bethany Beach has outlawed smoking on the boardwalk and beach. In Rehoboth Beach, smoking is banned in parks, playgrounds, the beach, the boardwalk, and adjacent public areas.

=== District of Columbia ===
- District-wide smoking ban: Effective January 2007, smoking is banned in bars, restaurants, and other public places in the District of Columbia; exempts outdoor areas, designated hotel/motel rooms, retail tobacco stores, cigar bars, hookah bars, and businesses that can show they receive 10% or more of their annual revenue from tobacco sales, excluding cigarette machines.

=== Florida ===
- Statewide smoking ban excluding bars: On July 1, 2003, a constitutional amendment passed by voters came into effect which banned smoking statewide in all enclosed workplaces in Florida, exempting private residences, retail tobacco shops, designated smoking rooms in hotels/motels, stand-alone bars with no more than 10% of revenue from food sales, rooms used for quit-smoking programs and medical research, and designated smoking areas in customs transit areas under the authority of the U.S. Department of Homeland Security. Local governments are generally preempted from regulating smoking, however a law passed in 2022 allows for local governments to restrict smoking in public parks and on beaches.

=== Georgia ===
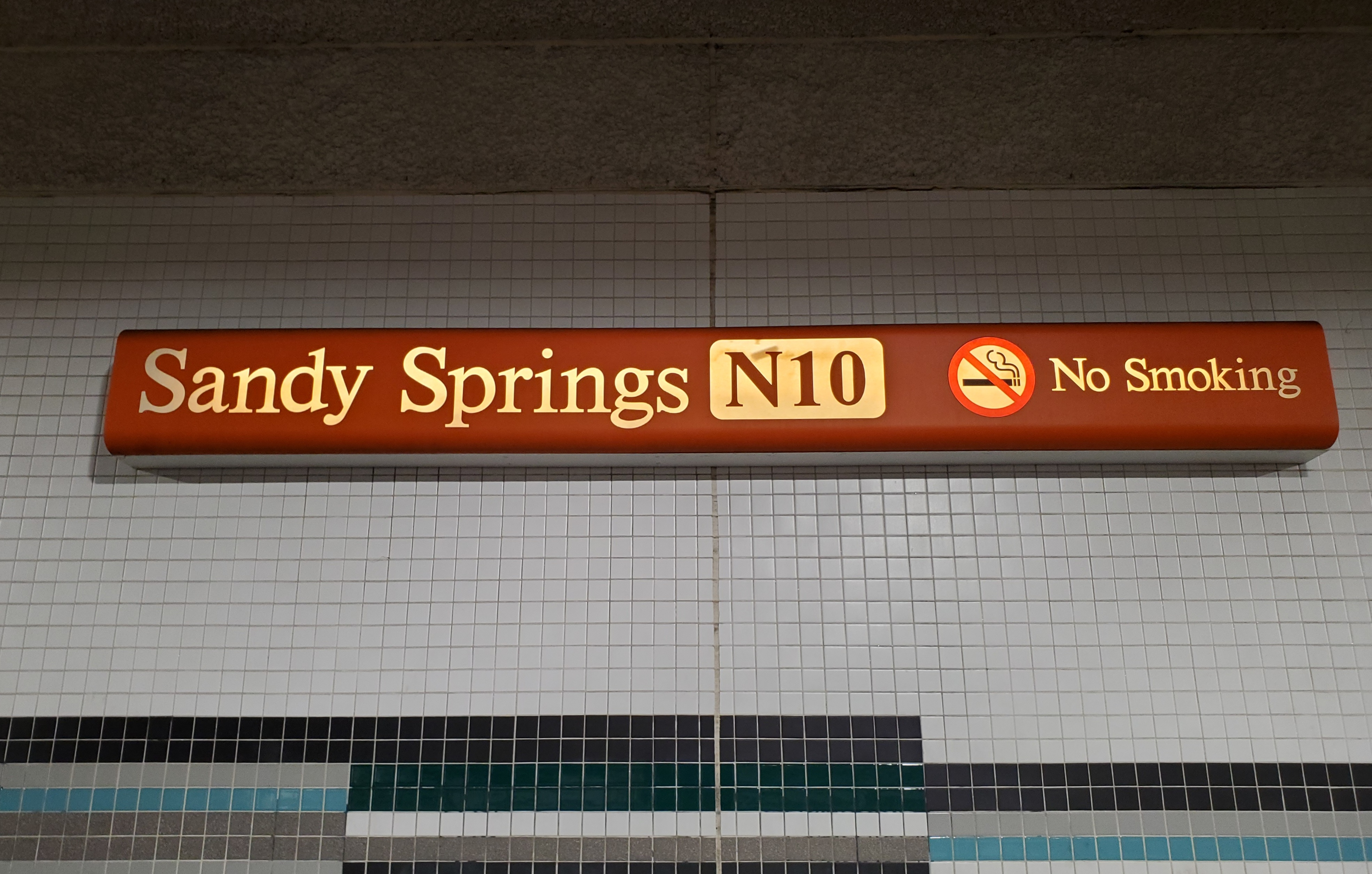
No smoking sign at the Sandy Springs station in Sandy Springs, Georgia

- No statewide smoking ban. Instead, Georgia's 2005 statewide smoking law, the Georgia Smokefree Air Act, prohibits smoking in all enclosed public places in Georgia, except each of the following: designated smoking areas in non-work areas of businesses that are separately ventilated, bars and restaurants where persons under 18 years of age are not employed or permitted to enter, separately enclosed smoking rooms in any bar or restaurant, private residences not used as healthcare or child daycare facilities, hotel/motel rooms designated as smoking rooms, retail tobacco stores, nursing homes, outdoor areas, designated areas in international airports, workplaces of a tobacco manufacturer or other tobacco business, privately owned meeting and assembly rooms during private functions where persons under 18 are not allowed, and areas of private places of employment (other than medical facilities) that are open to the general public by appointment only. Local governments may regulate smoking more strictly than the state. Buildings in which smoking is banned under the Act may have an outdoor smoking area that is located a reasonable distance from any entrance, exit, window, vent, or air intake system, but any ashtrays located there must be placed a reasonable distance away. A violation of the Act is punishable by a fine of between $100 and $500.
- Localities in Georgia with smoking bans that include all bars and restaurants (12 total):
  - Athens, July 7, 2005, banned in bars and restaurants, but not other workplaces
  - Atlanta, January 2, 2020, banned in all enclosed workplaces, including bars, restaurants, places of employment, hotel and motel rooms and other enclosed public areas.
  - Buena Vista, April 2, 2004, banned in all enclosed workplaces, including bars and restaurants
  - Chatham County, February 24, 2012, banned in all enclosed workplaces, including bars, private clubs, restaurants, and retail tobacco stores.
  - Effingham County, November 21, 2002, banned in bars and restaurants, but not other workplaces
  - Gainesville, July 1, 2005, banned in bars and restaurants, but not other workplaces
  - Morrow, September 22, 2006, banned in all enclosed workplaces, including bars and restaurants
  - Pooler, January 1, 2015, banned in all enclosed workplaces, including bars and restaurants
  - Richmond County, January 1, 2019, banned in all enclosed workplaces, including bars and restaurants, except for the cities of Blythe and Hephzibah
  - Savannah, January 1, 2011, banned in bars and restaurants and even service queues
  - Snellville, April 1, 2004, banned in bars and restaurants, but not other workplaces
  - Tift County, December 5, 2004, banned in bars and restaurants, but not other workplaces
- Localities in Georgia with smoking bans that do not include all bars and restaurants (16 total):
  - Berkeley Lake, May 1, 2004, banned in all enclosed workplaces, including restaurants but exempting bars
  - Clarkston, September 3, 2016, banned in all enclosed workplaces, including bars but exempting restaurants
  - Columbia County, January 1, 2005, banned in all enclosed workplaces, including restaurants but exempting bars
  - Cordele, June 1, 2004, banned in all enclosed workplaces, except bars and restaurants
  - Decatur, April 1, 2005, banned in all enclosed workplaces, including restaurants but exempting bars
  - DeKalb County, February 17, 2003, banned in all enclosed workplaces, except bars and restaurants
  - Douglas, June 26, 2004, banned in all enclosed workplaces, including restaurants but exempting bars
  - Douglas County, March 1, 2005, banned in all enclosed workplaces, except bars and restaurants
  - Douglasville, May 1, 2004, banned in all enclosed workplaces, except bars and restaurants
  - Dunwoody, December 1, 2008, banned in all enclosed workplaces, except bars and restaurants
  - Loganville, May 10, 2003, banned in all enclosed workplaces, including restaurants but exempting bars
  - Madison, November 8, 2004, banned in all restaurants, but not bars or all other enclosed workplaces
  - Peachtree City, October 18, 2004, banned in all restaurants, but not bars or all other enclosed workplaces
  - South Fulton, February 27, 2018, banned in all restaurants, but not bars or other enclosed workplaces
  - Tifton, October 18, 2004, banned in all restaurants, but not bars or all other enclosed workplaces
  - Valdosta, February 16, 2004, banned in all enclosed workplaces, including restaurants but exempting bars

=== Guam ===
- Territory-wide ban on smoking in restaurants only: On February 6, 2007, the Natasha Protection Act went into effect after the Supreme Court of Guam lifted an injunction on it, banning smoking in all restaurants, as well as in bars that double as restaurants between 4:00 am and 10:00 pm; the ban does not cover either stand-alone bars or workplaces in general. In 2009, a new act went into effect, additionally banning smoking within 20 feet of public buildings.

=== Hawaii ===
- Statewide smoking ban: On November 16, 2006, smoking was banned statewide in all enclosed or partially enclosed workplaces in Hawaii, including the indoor and outdoor portions of all bars and restaurants. The law exempts private residences not used as a healthcare or daycare facility, hotel/motel rooms designated as smoking rooms, retail tobacco stores, designated rooms in nursing homes, outdoor places of employment not part of bars or restaurants, any place where smoking is part of a production being filmed, and state correctional facilities. Smoking is prohibited within 20 feet (6.1 m) of the entrance/exit of a place where the law prohibits smoking indoors. Fines range from $50 for a person caught smoking in violation of the law, to between $100 and $500 for an establishment caught allowing smoking in violation of the law. Counties may regulate smoking more strictly than the state.
- Hawaii County, March 13, 2008, banned in public recreational areas, such as parks and beaches.

=== Idaho ===
- Statewide ban excluding bars and some workplaces: On July 1, 2004, the Clean Indoor Air Act went into effect, banning smoking statewide in all enclosed public places, except in bars, retail tobacco stores, private clubs when used by members or their guests/families, designated smoking rooms in hotels/motels, facilities rented/leased for private functions, theatrical productions, areas of owner-operated businesses with no employees besides the owners not generally open to the public, offices (other than childcare facilities) within private homes, veterans homes, bowling alleys (until July 2007), and designated breakrooms in businesses with 5 or fewer employees (as long as they are separate from work areas and minors are not allowed). Local governments may regulate smoking more strictly than the state.
- Boise, January 2, 2012, banned in all enclosed workplaces, including bars and private clubs, as well as in any public outdoor space accessible to children and in all spaces owned by the public, including parks.
- Moscow, August 4, 2009, banned in bars and private clubs, but not other workplaces.
- Ketchum, April 15, 2013, banned in a long list of areas that include all bars, city-owned facilities, parks, and indoor public places and places of employment, including hotel and motel rooms.

=== Illinois ===
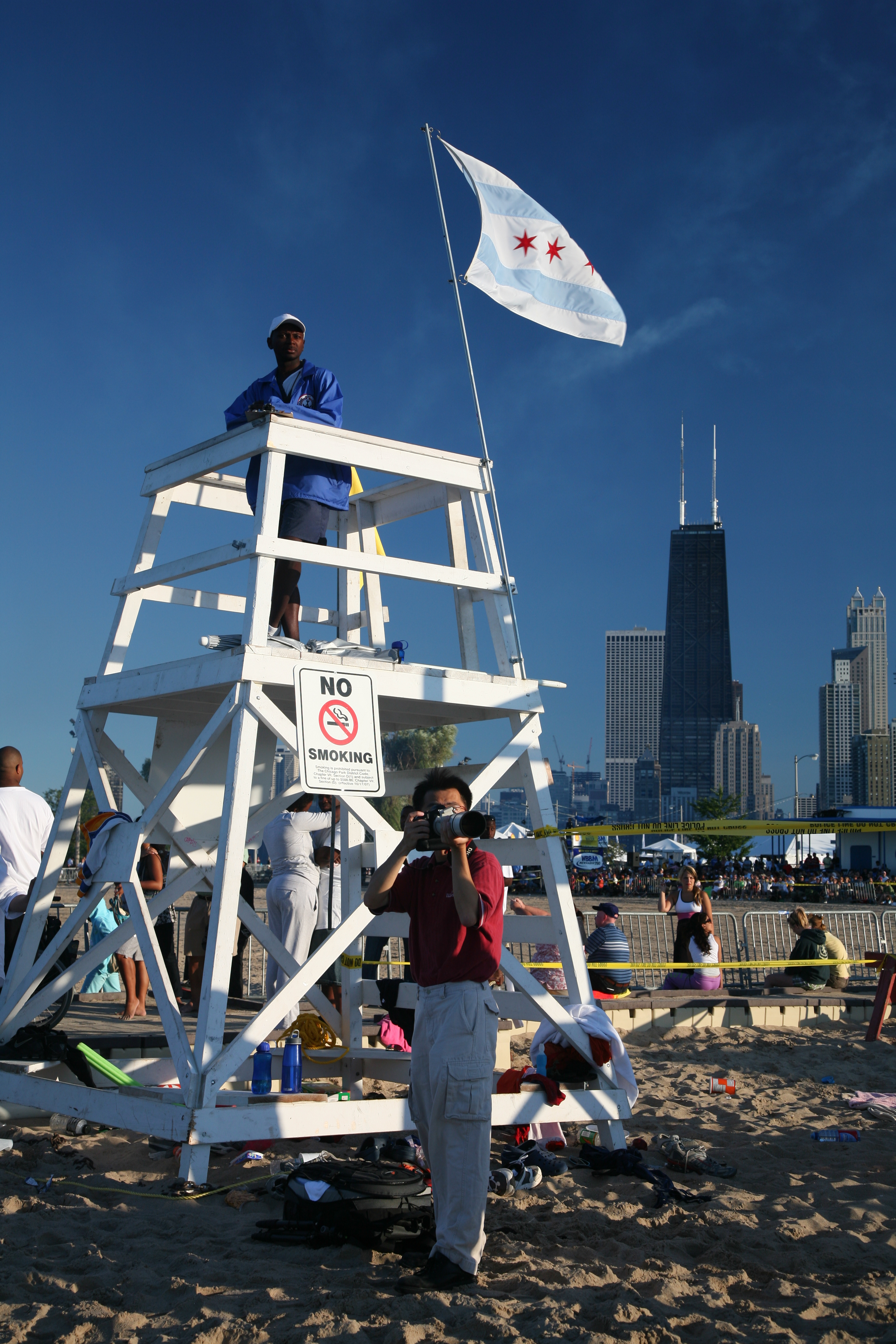
No Smoking sign at a beach in Chicago

- Statewide smoking ban: On January 1, 2008, the Smoke Free Illinois Act went into effect, banning smoking in all enclosed workplaces, including bars, restaurants, and casinos, and within 15 feet (4.6 m) of such places; exempts certain retail tobacco stores, private and semiprivate rooms in nursing homes occupied exclusively by smokers, enclosed and semi-enclosed temporary structures attached or adjacent to bars and restaurants, no more than 25% of designated smoking rooms in hotels/motels on the same floor, and private residences. Smoking is prohibited in private residences when defined as a place of employment such as when used for child care or foster care. Local governments may regulate smoking more strictly than the state.

Chicago has had its own Clean Indoor Air Ordinance since 1988. The Chicago Clean Indoor Air Act was updated to mention e-cigarettes in 2014, making it the first major U.S. city to legislate e-cigarette use. The Chicago Park District's Board of Commissioners has discussed banning all forms of smoking in Chicago parks, beaches, play lots and other facilities, but there is not yet a municipal ordinance.

=== Indiana ===
- Statewide smoking ban excluding bars and some restaurants Effective July 1, 2012, after having been signed into law by Governor Mitch Daniels on March 19, 2012, Indiana's 1993 statewide Clean Indoor Air Law was repealed and replaced by a new chapter of the Indiana Code titled "Prohibition on Smoking." The new chapter bans smoking in all enclosed public places and workplaces in Indiana and within 8 feet (2.4 m) of an entrance thereto, except as exempted. The law exempts: (1) horse racing facilities including off-track betting parlors; (2) riverboats; (3) all indoor portions of casinos and other licensed gaming facilities; (4) cigar bars and hookah lounges; (5) private clubs; (6) retail tobacco stores; (7) bars and taverns (defined as any business with a liquor license that does not allow in persons under 21 years of age); and (8) cigar manufacturers. The law expressly allows local governments to enact more stringent smoking restrictions.
- Austin, December 10, 2018, banned in all enclosed workplaces, including bars and restaurants
- Bloomington, January 1, 2005, banned in all enclosed workplaces, including bars and restaurants. Smoking is allowed only outside at a "reasonable distance" from doors, vents, and windows – measured by whether smoke can drift inside.
- Columbus, June 1, 2013, banned in all enclosed workplaces, including bars, restaurants, and private clubs
- Cumberland, January 1, 2008, banned in all enclosed workplaces, including bars and restaurants
- Delaware County, August 11, 2011, banned in all enclosed workplaces, bars, private clubs and restaurants
- Elkhart, May 1, 2008, banned in all enclosed workplaces, including restaurants but exempted existing bars until May 1, 2009, with a grandfather clause
- Franklin, June 8, 2009, banned in all enclosed workplaces, including bars and restaurants
- Fort Wayne, June 1, 2007, banned in all enclosed workplaces, including bars and restaurants
- Greencastle, September 1, 2007, banned in all enclosed workplaces, including bars and restaurants.
- Hancock County, March 15, 2009, banned in all enclosed workplaces, including bars and restaurants.
- Howard County, July 1, 2017, banned in all enclosed workplaces, including bars and restaurants
- Indianapolis, June 1, 2012, banned in all enclosed workplaces, including bars and restaurants; exempts cigar and hookah bars, retail tobacco stores, off-track betting facilities and private clubs and veterans halls
- Lawrence, October 1, 2012, banned in all enclosed workplaces, including bars and restaurants
- Monroe County, February 1, 2006, banned in all enclosed workplaces, including bars and restaurants. Ban also applies to drivers carrying children aged 13 or younger.
- North Manchester, August 31, 2018, banned in all enclosed workplaces, including bars and restaurants
- Plainfield, February 1, 2007, banned in all enclosed workplaces, including bars and restaurants but exempting private clubs; nursing homes were exempt until July 1, 2012, when the new statewide smoking ban took effect
- South Bend, January 2, 2017, banned in all enclosed workplaces, including bars and restaurants
- Terre Haute, July 1, 2012, banned in all enclosed workplaces, including bars and restaurants
- Vanderburgh County, July 1, 2011, banned in all enclosed workplaces, including bars & restaurants; under new provisions, smoking is prohibited within 10 feet (3.0 m) of entrances where smoking is banned to ensure that no smoke can drift inside; excludes retail tobacco stores, fraternal clubs and private clubs that prohibit persons younger than 18
- Vigo County, June 26, 2012, banned in all enclosed workplaces, including bars, restaurants and private clubs
- West Lafayette, July 1, 2007, banned in all enclosed workplaces, including bars and restaurants but exempting tobacco bars, private residences, designated hotel/motel smoking rooms, retail tobacco stores, private clubs, and outdoor areas in the city
- Zionsville, July 5, 2006, banned in all enclosed workplaces, including bars, restaurants, and private clubs

=== Iowa ===
- Statewide smoking ban: On July 1, 2008, the Iowa Smokefree Air Act went into effect, banning smoking statewide in all workplaces in Iowa, including bars and restaurants, as well as the outdoor areas of schools, stadia, restaurants, and public transit areas (including bus shelters). The Act does not legislate smoking in public parks. The Act exempts private residences while not being used as a childcare or healthcare facility, outdoor areas where smoking is not specifically prohibited, hotel/motel rooms designated as smoking rooms, retail tobacco stores, private and semiprivate rooms in nursing homes occupied by smokers, private clubs, limousines under private hire, private work vehicles where only one employee is located, places where a quit-smoking program is taking place, farm vehicles, casino gaming floors, the state-run veterans' home in Marshalltown, and designated areas of correctional facilities. Fines for individuals found in violation of the Smokefree Air Act are $50 per violation. Fines for businesses range anywhere from $100 to $500 for each violation with the eventual possibility of revocation of liquor or business license for habitually offending businesses.

=== Kansas ===
- Statewide smoking ban: On July 1, 2010, after being signed into law by Governor Mark Parkinson on March 12, 2010, an amendment to Kansas' 1987 statewide smoking law took effect, banning smoking statewide in all enclosed, indoor workplaces in Kansas. The law will exempt only (1) casino and racetrack gaming floors, (2) the entire area of a private club that was in existence on January 1, 2009, (3) designated areas in any private club where persons under 18 are prohibited, (4) tobacconists, (5) designated hotel and motel smoking rooms, (6) designated smoking areas in nursing homes and healthcare facilities, (7) and all outdoor areas, unless within a 10' radius of an entryway to a public building. The amendment will not change the original law's provision allowing local governments to regulate smoking more stringently than the state, which the Kansas Supreme Court reiterated in 2007 upon a bar owner's challenge to Lawrence's local smoking ban. On June 30, 2010, the District Court of Shawnee County, Kansas, issued a preliminary injunction prohibiting the statewide smoking ban from taking effect in 31 private clubs established after January 1, 2009, until it settles a lawsuit against the state by those clubs.

=== Kentucky ===
- No statewide smoking ban. Instead, in Kentucky, the only state laws dealing with smoking prohibit smoking in government offices, universities, and the state capitol, except in designated smoking areas. In 2004, the Kentucky Supreme Court ruled that the state's food and tobacco sales laws do not preempt cities and counties from enacting smoking regulations of any kind.
- Localities in Kentucky with smoking bans that include all bars and restaurants (37 total):
  - Ashland, October 1, 2006, banned in all enclosed workplaces, including bars and restaurants, as well as outdoor venues and outdoor patio areas of bars and restaurants
  - Bardstown, June 17, 2010, banned in all enclosed workplaces, including bars and restaurants
  - Berea, September 2, 2014, banned in all enclosed workplaces, including bars and restaurants
  - Bowling Green, April 28, 2011, banned in all enclosed workplaces, including bars and restaurants
  - Campbellsville, June 1, 2009, banned in all enclosed workplaces, including bars and restaurants
  - Clarkson, May 18, 2017, banned in all enclosed workplaces, including bars and restaurants
  - Corbin, November 23, 2011, banned in all enclosed workplaces, including bars and restaurants
  - Danville, June 27, 2008, banned in all enclosed workplaces, including bars and restaurants, as well as within ten feet of the entrance of any such place
  - Dayton, November 6, 2022, banned in all enclosed workplaces, including bars and restaurants
  - Elizabethtown, December 1, 2006, banned in all enclosed workplaces, including bars and restaurants
  - Frankfort, August 7, 2006, banned in all bars and restaurants, but not in all other workplaces
  - Franklin County, May 4, 2012, banned in all enclosed workplaces, including bars and restaurants
  - Georgetown, October 1, 2006, banned in all enclosed workplaces, including bars and restaurants
  - Glasgow, June 20, 2010, banned in bars and restaurants, but not all other workplaces
  - Hardin County, April 1, 2007, banned in all enclosed workplaces, including bars and restaurants, in unincorporated areas of the county
  - Leitchfield, January 1, 2017, banned in all bars and restaurants, but not other workplaces
  - Lexington, November 6, 2008, banned in all enclosed workplaces, including bars and restaurants
  - London, August 3, 2009, banned in all enclosed workplaces, including bars and restaurants
  - Louisville, July 1, 2007, banned in all enclosed workplaces, including bars and restaurants.
  - Manchester, January 29, 2012, banned in all enclosed workplaces, including bars and restaurants
  - Martin, June 26, 2018, banned in all enclosed workplaces, including bars and restaurants
  - Midway, August 18, 2014, banned in all enclosed workplaces, including bars and restaurants
  - Middlesborough, August 17, 2015, banned in all enclosed workplaces, including restaurants; this municipality is dry
  - Morehead, August 1, 2006, banned in all enclosed workplaces, including bars and restaurants
  - Murray, September 12, 2018, banned in all enclosed workplaces, including bars and restaurants
  - Oldham County, April 17, 2018, banned in enclosed workplaces, including bars and restaurants
  - Owensboro, October 15, 2014, banned in bars and restaurants, but not other workplaces
  - Paducah, May 10, 2018, banned in all enclosed workplaces, including bars and restaurants
  - Prestonburg, November 1, 2009, banned in all enclosed workplaces, including bars and restaurants
  - Radcliff, April 1, 2010, banned in all enclosed workplaces, including bars and restaurants
  - Richmond, September 9, 2014, banned in all enclosed workplaces, including bars and restaurants
  - Salyersville, April 1, 2018, banned in all enclosed workplaces, including bars and restaurants
  - Somerset, November 14, 2007, banned in all enclosed workplaces, including bars and restaurants; exempts private clubs when not open to the public
  - Stanford, April 19, 2018, banned in all enclosed workplaces, including bars and restaurants
  - Versailles, October 6, 2014, banned in all enclosed workplaces, including bars and restaurants
  - Williamsburg, February 11, 2013, banned in all enclosed workplaces, including bars and restaurants
  - Williamstown, September 18, 2018, banned in all enclosed workplaces, including bars and restaurants
  - Woodford County, December 4, 2014, banned in all enclosed workplaces, including bars and restaurants
- Localities in Kentucky with smoking bans that do not include all bars and restaurants (5 total):
  - Henderson, October 1, 2006, banned in all enclosed workplaces, excluding bars and restaurants
  - Kenton County, April 15, 2011, banned in all workplaces, except for establishments with a liquor license
  - Letcher County, July 1, 2006, banned in restaurants, but not bars or other workplaces
  - Paintsville, January 31, 2007, banned in restaurants, but not bars or other enclosed workplaces
  - Pikeville, November 1, 2007, banned in all restaurants, but not bars or all other workplaces
- Localities in Kentucky with smoking ban in vehicles:
  - Bullitt County, banned in private vehicles in the presence of children under the age of 18

=== Louisiana ===
- Statewide smoking ban excluding bars: On January 1, 2007, SB 742 went into effect, banning smoking in all schools, workplaces, and public places, including restaurants. The law exempts bars (food establishments where the majority of sales are derived from alcohol), private residences and automobiles except those when used as a healthcare or childcare facility, limousines under private hire, designated hotel/motel smoking rooms, retail tobacco shops, outdoor areas, private and semiprivate rooms of nursing homes occupied exclusively by smokers, casino gaming floors, workplaces of tobacco-related businesses such as manufacturers and distributors, convention and banquet facilities rented out to private parties, and correctional facilities (until August 1, 2009). Local governments may regulate smoking more strictly than the state. Prior to this ordinance, six localities had smoking provisions that exempted restaurants, but were later superseded by the Act once it had gone into effect, and localities were prohibited from regulating or prohibiting smoking in bars and restaurants as well.
- Abbeville, January 1, 2015, banned in all enclosed public places, including bars and gaming establishments
- Alexandria, January 2, 2012, banned in all enclosed public places, including bars and gaming establishments
- Baton Rouge, June 1, 2018, banned in all enclosed public places, including bars and gaming establishments
- Bogalusa, December 21, 2016, banned in all enclosed public places, including bars and gaming establishments
- Boyce, June 14, 2019, banned in all enclosed public places, including bars and gaming establishments
- Campti, September 8, 2022, banned in all enclosed public places, including bars and gaming establishments
- Cheneyville, June 7, 2014, banned in all enclosed public places, including bars and gaming establishments
- Colfax, June 8, 2017, banned in all enclosed public places, including bars and gaming establishments
- Cullen, May 1, 2019, banned in all enclosed public places, including bars and gaming establishments
- Farmerville, November 9, 2022, banned in all enclosed public places, including bars and gaming establishments
- Fenton, May 9, 2019, banned in all enclosed public places, including bars and gaming establishments
- Glenmora, March 15, 2017, banned in all enclosed public places, including bars and gaming establishments
- Hammond, July 20, 2015, banned in all enclosed public places, including bars and gaming establishments
- Lafayette Parish, April 27, 2017, banned in all enclosed public places, including bars and gaming establishments
- Lecompte, December 10, 2017, banned in all enclosed public places, including bars and gaming establishments
- McNary, July 4, 2018, banned in all enclosed public places, including bars and gaming establishments
- Monroe, January 2, 2014, banned in all enclosed public places, including bars and gaming establishments
- Natchez, January 13, 2020, banned in all enclosed public places, including bars and gaming establishments
- New Iberia, March 15, 2022, banned in all enclosed public places, including bars and gaming establishments
- New Orleans, April 22, 2015, banned in all enclosed public places, including bars and gaming establishments
- Ouachita Parish, January 2, 2014, banned in all enclosed public places, including bars and gaming establishments
- Pineville, February 12, 2019, banned in all enclosed public places, including bars and gaming establishments
- Ponchatoula, May 12, 2019, banned in all enclosed public places, including bars and gaming establishments
- Ringgolld, March 11, 2023, banned in all enclosed public places, including bars and gaming establishments
- Roseland, August 19, 2018, banned in all enclosed public places, including bars and gaming establishments
- Ruston, April 1, 2019, banned in all enclosed public places, including bars and gaming establishments
- Shreveport, August 1, 2021, banned in all enclosed public places, including bars and gaming establishments
- West Monroe, January 2, 2014, banned in all enclosed public places, including bars and gaming establishments
- Woodworth, April 15, 2012, banned in all enclosed public places, including bars and gaming establishments

=== Maine ===
- Statewide smoking ban: Effective January 1, 2004, laws from 1985 and 1999 were expanded such that smoking is banned statewide in all workplaces and public places in Maine, including bars and restaurants. The law exempts places open to the public during hours when it is closed, stage performances involving smoking, smoking for religious rituals, factories where labor unions have contracted to have smoking areas, designated areas in hospitals, designated hotel/motel smoking rooms, private residences except when used as a childcare or healthcare facility, beano and bingo halls, tobacco specialty stores, and off-track betting parlors that were in existence on June 30, 2003. The state law exempts private clubs (Elks, American Legion, VFW etc.) under certain conditions. The state law is silent as to whether local governments may regulate smoking more strictly than the state, though as of April 2009 no local government in Maine has done so. Effective September 1, 2008, smoking is banned in any car when a person under the age of 16 is present, though no driver may be pulled over or searched solely for violation of this law.

=== Maryland ===
Tobacco-free sign at a park in Anne Arundel County

- Statewide smoking ban: On February 1, 2008, the Maryland Clean Indoor Air Act of 2007 went into effect, banning smoking in all public transportation vehicles, enclosed public places, and enclosed workplaces, including bars, restaurants, casinos, and private clubs. The Act exempts private residences and vehicles while not being used as a childcare or healthcare facility, designated hotel/motel smoking rooms, retail tobacco stores, cigar lounges and hookah bars, other tobacco-related workplaces such as importers and distributors, facilities where smoking research is conducted, psychiatric facilities, long-term care facilities, hospitals where a doctor has authorized a patient to smoke, and any business that has applied for and received a waiver allowing smoking (though all waivers expired on January 1, 2011). Local governments may regulate smoking more strictly than the state, though not less strictly.

=== Massachusetts ===
No smoking sign on a trash can at a park in Worcester, Massachusetts

- Statewide smoking ban: Effective July 1, 2004, smoking is banned in all enclosed public places and workplaces, including bars and restaurants. The law exempts private clubs when not open to the public, private residences except when used as a business for healthcare or childcare, designated hotel/motel smoking rooms, retail tobacco stores, licensed cigar or hookah bars, stage performances involving smoking, places where smoking-related scientific research is occurring, religious ceremonies involving smoking, outdoor areas, designated areas in nursing homes as approved by the state, and other tobacco-related workplaces such as farms and distributors. Local governments and boards of health may regulate smoking more strictly than the state.
- Boston, February 9, 2009, banned by the Boston Public Health Commission on outside patios of bars and restaurants; also banned on February 9, 2019 (10 years later than the other new restrictions), in cigar and hookah bars, unless the establishment obtains an additional 10-year exemption. Additionally, smoking is banned in all hotel rooms in the city of Boston.

=== Michigan ===
- Statewide smoking ban: On May 1, 2010, after being signed into law by Governor Jennifer Granholm on December 18, 2009, the Dr. Ron Davis Law took effect, banning smoking statewide in all enclosed, indoor workplaces in Michigan, as well as the outdoor patios of bars and restaurants. The law exempts only cigar bars, retail tobacco stores, private home offices, company vehicles including commercial trucks, and Detroit's three casinos' gambling floors. The law is silent as to whether local governments may regulate smoking more strictly than the state, though it prohibits state or local health departments from enacting any smoking rules different than the law.

=== Minnesota ===
- Statewide smoking ban: On October 1, 2007, the Freedom to Breathe Act went into effect, expanding the existing Clean Indoor Air Act of 1975 so as to ban smoking statewide in all enclosed workplaces in Minnesota, including public transportation, bars, and restaurants. The Act exempts designated rooms in nursing homes, designated areas in psychiatric facilities, places where scientific studies related to smoking occur, private homes and residences not in use as a place of employment, designated hotel/motel smoking rooms, retail tobacco shops, heavy commercial vehicles, farm vehicles and construction equipment, buildings on family farms, the Minnesota disabled veterans' rest camp, smoking by American Indians as part of a traditional spiritual or cultural ceremony, stage performances involving smoking, and outdoor areas. Local governments may regulate smoking more stringently than the state.

On August 1, 2019, e-cigarettes were banned in all locations that traditional cigarettes were banned.

On August 1, 2023, smoking cannabis was included in the smoking ban, upon becoming legal.

- Carlton County, June 1, 2007, banned on 50% of outdoor patio seating in bars and restaurants.
- Duluth, March 7, 2010, banned within 15 feet (4.6 m) of a bus shelter or transit center.
- Golden Valley, March 31, 2009, banned within 25 feet (7.6 m) of entrances, exits, and ventilation openings of all areas of bars and restaurants; also in public parks and recreational facilities.
- Rochester, June 2010 Downtown smoke-free zone includes the block of Second Avenue Southwest between Gonda and the Kahler, and the two-block pedestrian mall known as the Peace Plaza. The zone was extended in June 2010 to include two blocks of West Center Street between the Kahler Grand Hotel, Methodist Hospital and the Gonda Building.

=== Mississippi ===
- No statewide smoking ban. Instead, Mississippi's 2006 statewide smoking law, the Clean Indoor Air Act, prohibits smoking only inside any state or local government building (except designated areas in the state's veterans' homes) or inside any university or college classroom building. Local governments may regulate smoking more stringently than the Act.
- Localities in Mississippi with smoking bans that include all bars and restaurants (172 total):
  - Aberdeen, March 22, 2007, banned in all bars and restaurants, but not in all other enclosed workplaces
  - Alligator, July 5, 2012, banned in all enclosed workplaces, including all bars and restaurants
  - Amory, November 1, 2007, banned in all enclosed workplaces, including all bars and restaurants
  - Anguilla, April 27, 2012, banned in all enclosed workplaces, including all bars and restaurants
  - Arcola, May 10, 2012, banned in all enclosed workplaces, including all bars and restaurants
  - Artesia, May 5, 2016, banned in all enclosed workplaces, including all bars and restaurants
  - Baldwyn, July 5, 2013, banned in all enclosed workplaces, including all bars and restaurants
  - Bassfield, March 4, 2010, banned in all enclosed workplaces, including all bars and restaurants
  - Batesville, March 4, 2010, banned in all bars and restaurants, but not other workplaces
  - Beaumont, March 14, 2024, banned in all enclosed workplaces, including all bars and restaurants
  - Beauregard, March 4, 2023, banned in all enclosed workplaces, including all bars and restaurants
  - Belmont, December 1, 2016, banned in all enclosed workplaces, including all bars and restaurants
  - Belzoni, July 1, 2010, banned in all enclosed workplaces, including all bars and restaurants
  - Beulah, September 3, 2014, banned in all enclosed workplaces, including all bars and restaurants
  - Blue Mountain, December 7, 2017, banned in all enclosed workplaces, including all bars and restaurants
  - Booneville, June 30, 2012, banned in all enclosed workplaces, including restaurants; this municipality is dry
  - Brandon, May 4, 2015, banned in all enclosed workplaces, including all bars and restaurants
  - Brookhaven, May 22, 2019, banned in all enclosed workplaces, including all bars and restaurants
  - Brooksville, July 2, 2015, banned in all enclosed workplaces, including all bars and restaurants
  - Bruce, January 2, 2014, banned in all enclosed workplaces, including all bars and restaurants
  - Byram, December 10, 2011, banned in all enclosed workplaces, including all bars and restaurants
  - Calhoun City, September 1, 2011, banned in all enclosed workplaces, including all bars and restaurants
  - Canton, January 19, 2012, banned in all enclosed workplaces, including all bars and restaurants
  - Cary, December 8, 2012, banned in all enclosed workplaces, including all bars and restaurants
  - Centreville, December 17, 2011, banned in all enclosed workplaces, including all bars and restaurants
  - Charleston, March 7, 2015, banned in all enclosed workplaces, including all bars and restaurants
  - Clarksdale, September 10, 2014, banned in all enclosed workplaces, including all bars and restaurants
  - Clinton, August 14, 2008, banned in all enclosed workplaces, including all bars and restaurants
  - Coahoma County, November 16, 2012, banned in all enclosed workplaces, including all bars and restaurants
  - Coldwater, March 3, 2016, banned in all enclosed workplaces, including all bars and restaurants
  - Collins, June 5, 2008, banned in all enclosed workplaces, including all bars and restaurants
  - Corinth, November 6, 2007, banned in all enclosed workplaces, including restaurants, by vote of the Board of Aldermen; this municipality is dry
  - Courtland, April 2, 2015, banned in all enclosed workplaces, including all bars and restaurants
  - Crawford, May 28, 2010, banned in all enclosed workplaces, including all bars and restaurants
  - Crenshaw, October 17, 2018, banned in all bars and restaurants, but not other workplaces
  - Crosby, June 1, 2023, banned in all enclosed workplaces, including all bars and restaurants
  - Cruger, April 6, 2016, banned in all enclosed workplaces, including all bars and restaurants
  - Crystal Springs, November 1, 2008, banned in all enclosed workplaces, including all bars and restaurants
  - Drew, April 2, 2015, banned in all enclosed workplaces, including all bars and restaurants
  - Duck Hill, April 9, 2014, banned in all enclosed workplaces, including all bars and restaurants
  - Duncan, April 5, 2012, banned in all enclosed workplaces, including all bars and restaurants
  - Durant, May 3, 2012, banned in all enclosed workplaces, including all bars and restaurants
  - Ecru, March 12, 2008, banned in bars and restaurants, but not in all other enclosed workplaces
  - Eden, August 13, 2015, banned in all enclosed workplaces, including all bars and restaurants
  - Edwards, December 15, 2016, banned in all enclosed workplaces, including all bars and restaurants
  - Ellisville, November 5, 2015, banned in all enclosed workplaces, including all bars and restaurants
  - Ethel, November 1, 2012, banned in all enclosed workplaces, including all bars and restaurants
  - Eupora, March 4, 2020, banned in all enclosed workplaces, including all bars and rresaurants
  - Falcon, April 13, 2018, banned in all enclosed workplaces, including all bars and restaurants
  - Farmington, February 20, 2014, banned in all enclosed workplaces, including all bars and restaurants
  - Fayette, June 11, 2015, banned in all enclosed workplaces, including all bars and restaurants
  - Floria, December 13, 2007, banned in all enclosed workplaces, including all bars and restaurants
  - Florence, September 20, 2012, banned in all enclosed workplaces, including all bars and restaurants
  - Forest, September 6, 2012, banned in all enclosed workplaces, including all bars and restaurants
  - Friars Point, January 8, 2014, banned in all enclosed workplaces, including all bars and restaurants
  - Fulton, March 18, 2017, banned in all enclosed workplaces, including all bars and restaurants
  - Georgetown, April 11, 2012, banned in all enclosed workplaces, including all bars and restaurants
  - Glen, September 1, 2023, banned in all enclosed workplaces, including all bars and restaurants
  - Glendora, September 7, 2017, banned in all enclosed workplaces, including all bars and restaurants
  - Gluckstadt, March 16, 2023, banned in all enclosed workplaces, including all bars and restaurants
  - Gloster, January 2, 2020, banned in all enclosed workplaces, including all bars and restaurants
  - Greenwood, August 17, 2007, banned in all enclosed workplaces, including all bars and restaurants
  - Grenada, January 8, 2009, banned in all bars and restaurants, but not in all other workplaces
  - Gunnison, May 3, 2018, banned in all enclosed workplaces, including all bars and restaurants
  - Guntown, October 23, 2020, banned in all enclosed workplaces, including all bars and restaurants
  - Hatley, September 6, 2018, banned in all enclosed workplaces, including all bars and restaurants
  - Hattiesburg, January 1, 2007, banned in all enclosed workplaces, including all bars and restaurants
  - Heidelberg, May 4, 2017, banned in all enclosed workplaces, including all bars and restaurants
  - Hernando, March 8, 2007, banned in all enclosed workplaces, including all bars and restaurants
  - Hollandale, December 3, 2009, banned in all enclosed workplaces, including all bars and restaurants
  - Holly Springs, October 1, 2015, banned in all enclosed workplaces, including all bars and restaurants
  - Houston, September 3, 2016, banned in all enclosed workplaces, including all bars and restaurants
  - Indianola, November 7, 2012, banned in all enclosed workplaces, including all bars and restaurants
  - Isola, September 4, 2014, banned in all enclosed workplaces, including all bars and restaurants
  - Issaquena County, June 6, 2018, banned in all enclosed workplaces, including all bars and restaurants
  - Itta Bena, January 16, 2014, banned in all enclosed workplaces, including all bars and restaurants
  - Iuka, January 1, 2015, banned in all enclosed workplaces, including all bars and restaurants
  - Jackson, July 2, 2010, banned in all enclosed workplaces, including all bars and restaurants
  - Jonestown, October 13, 2010, banned in all enclosed workplaces, including all bars and restaurants
  - Kosciusko, November 2, 2007, banned in all enclosed workplaces, including all bars and restaurants
  - Lambert, March 7, 2018, banned in all enclosed workplaces, including all bars and restaurants
  - Laurel, December 4, 2008, banned in all enclosed workplaces, including all bars and restaurants
  - Leland, March 15, 2022, banned in all enclosed workplaces, including all bars and restaurants
  - Lexington, October 11, 2015, banned in all enclosed workplaces, including all bars and restaurants
  - Louise, October 1, 2015, banned in all enclosed workplaces, including all bars and restaurants
  - Louisville, April 3, 2014, banned in all enclosed workplaces, including all bars and restaurants
  - Lucedale, February 1, 2013, banned in all enclosed workplaces, including all bars and restaurants
  - Lula, December 4, 2015, banned in all enclosed workplaces, including all bars and restaurants
  - Lumberton, July 3, 2010, banned in all enclosed workplaces, including all bars and restaurants
  - Lyon, October 2, 2014, banned in all enclosed workplaces, including all bars and restaurants
  - Maben, November 6, 2020, banned in all enclosed workplaces, including all bars and restaurants
  - Macon, September 17, 2015, banned in all enclosed workplaces, including all bars and restaurants
  - Madison, June 3, 2010, banned in all enclosed workplaces, including all bars and restaurants
  - Madison County, July 19, 2017, banned in all enclosed workplaces, including all bars and restaurants
  - Magee, November 19, 2013, banned in all enclosed workplaces, including all bars and restaurants
  - Mantachie, September 9, 2014, banned in all enclosed workplaces, including all bars and restaurants
  - Mantee, January 4, 2023, banned in all enclosed workplaces, including all bars and restaurants
  - Marks, June 14, 2011, banned in all enclosed workplaces, including all bars and restaurants
  - Mayersville, September 17, 2005, banned in all enclosed workplaces, including all bars and restaurants
  - Meadville, March 2, 2015, banned in all enclosed workplaces, including all bars and restaurants
  - Mendenhall, March 4, 2014, banned in all enclosed workplaces, including all bars and restaurants
  - Meridian, February 19, 2010, banned in all enclosed workplaces, including all bars and restaurants
  - Metcalfe, September 3, 2002, banned in all enclosed workplaces, including all bars and restaurants
  - Monticello, January 18, 2012, banned in all bars and restaurants, but not all other enclosed workplaces
  - Moorhead, January 11, 2013, banned in all enclosed workplaces, including all bars and restaurants
  - Morton, October 31, 2013, banned in all enclosed workplaces, including all bars and restaurants
  - Mound Bayou, December 1, 2022, banned in all enclosed workplaces, including all bars and restaurants
  - Moss Point, June 14, 2012, banned in all enclosed workplaces, including all bars and restaurants
  - Mount Olive, July 7, 2022, banned in all bars and restaurants, but not other workplaces
  - Nettleton, February 5, 2015, banned in all enclosed workplaces, including bars and restaurants
  - New Albany, December 1, 2011, banned in all enclosed workplaces, including all bars and restaurants
  - New Augusta, May 31, 2012, banned in all enclosed workplaces, including all bars and restaurants
  - New Houlka, February 4, 2021, banned in all enclosed workplaces, including all bars and restaurants
  - North Carrollton, April 9, 2023, banned in all enclosed workplaces, including all bars and restaurants
  - Noxapater, May 1, 2014, banned in all enclosed workplaces, including all bars and restaurants
  - Oakland, March 9, 2017, banned in all enclosed workplaces, including all bars and restaurants
  - Okolona, April 15, 2011, banned in all enclosed workplaces, including all bars and restaurants
  - Oxford, October 16, 2006, banned in all bars and restaurants, but not in all other enclosed workplaces
  - Pascagoula, July 18, 2013, banned in all bars and restaurants, but not other workplaces
  - Petal, December 20, 2007, banned in nearly all enclosed workplaces, including all bars and restaurants
  - Picayune, July 26, 2014, banned in all enclosed workplaces, including all bars and restaurants
  - Pickens, July 2, 2015, banned in all enclosed workplaces, including all bars and restaurants
  - Pittsboro, June 4, 2015, banned in all enclosed workplaces, including all bars and restaurants
  - Plantersville, July 6, 2013, banned in all enclosed workplaces, including all bars and restaurants
  - Pontotoc, May 1, 2008, banned in all bars and restaurants, but not in all other enclosed workplaces
  - Poplarville, January 3, 2015, banned in all enclosed workplaces, including all bars and restaurants
  - Prentiss, April 1, 2010, banned in all enclosed workplaces, including all bars and restaurants
  - Quitman, March 23, 2017, banned in all enclosed workplaces, including all bars and restaurants
  - Quitman County, July 31, 2020, banned in all enclosed workplaces, including all bars and restaurants
  - Renova, September 2, 2016, banned in all enclosed workplaces, including all bars and restaurants
  - Richland, November 2, 2017, banned in all enclosed workplaces, including all bars and restaurants
  - Ridgeland, July 19, 2007, banned in all enclosed workplaces, including all bars and restaurants
  - Ripley, January 2, 2020, banned in all enclosed workplaces, including all bars and restaurants
  - Rolling Fork, December 12, 2011, banned in all enclosed workplaces, including all bars and restaurants
  - Roxie, July 6, 2017, banned in all enclosed workplaces, including all bars and restaurants
  - Saltillo, September 18, 2015, banned in all enclosed workplaces, including all bars and restaurants
  - Scooba, October 14, 2017, banned in all enclosed workplaces, including all bars and restaurants
  - Sebastopol, September 1, 2016, banned in all enclosed workplaces, including all bars and restaurants
  - Senatobia, November 20, 2014, banned in all enclosed workplaces, including all bars and restaurants
  - Sharkey County, March 7, 2018, banned in all enclosed workplaces, including all bars and restaurants
  - Shaw, October 24, 2015, banned in all enclosed workplaces, including all bars and restaurants
  - Shelby, July 9, 2022, banned in all enclosed workplaces, including all bars and restaurants
  - Shubuta, December 2, 2015, banned in all enclosed workplaces, including all bars and restaurants
  - Shuqualak, May 31, 2012, banned in all enclosed workplaces, including all bars and restaurants
  - Sidon, February 5, 2015, banned in all enclosed workplaces, including all bars and restaurants
  - Silver City, March 5, 2020, banned in all enclosed workplaces, including all bars and restaurants
  - Sledge, June 4, 2014, banned in all enclosed workplaces, including all bars and restaurants
  - Southaven, August 4, 2014, banned in all enclosed workplaces, including all bars and restaurants
  - Starkville, May 20, 2006, banned in all enclosed workplaces, including all bars and restaurants
  - State Line, July 2, 2015, banned in all enclosed workplaces, including all bars and restaurants
  - Summit, March 16, 2017, banned in all enclosed workplaces, including all bars and restaurants
  - Sumner, July 5, 2012, banned in all enclosed workplaces, including all bars and restaurants
  - Sumrall, July 3, 2010, banned in all enclosed workplaces, including all bars and restaurants
  - Tchula, August 13, 2016, banned in all enclosed workplaces, including all bars and restaurants
  - Terry, June 6, 2020, banned in all enclosed workplaces, including all bars and restaurants
  - Tremont, February 2, 2019, banned in all enclosed workplaces, including all bars and restaurants
  - Tupelo, October 5, 2006, banned in all enclosed workplaces, including all bars and restaurants
  - Tutwiler, April 2, 2015, banned in all enclosed workplaces, including bars and restaurants
  - Utica, September 8, 2016, banned in all enclosed workplaces, including all bars and restaurants
  - Vaiden, January 3, 2018, banned in all enclosed workplaces, including all bars and restaurants
  - Verona, May 3, 2012, banned in all enclosed workplaces, including all bars and restaurants
  - Walnut, December 5, 2013, banned in all enclosed workplaces, including all bars and restaurants
  - Walnut Grove, April 2, 2015, banned in all enclosed workplaces, including all bars and restaurants
  - Washington County, November 18, 2020, banned in all enclosed workplaces, including all bars and restaurants
  - Webb, March 9, 2017, banned in all enclosed workplaces, including all bars and restaurants
  - Weir, April 10, 2014, banned in all enclosed workplaces, including all bars and restaurants
  - Wesson, July 1, 2010, banned in all enclosed workplaces, including all bars and restaurants
  - Wiggins, January 17, 2013, banned in all enclosed workplaces, including all bars and restaurants
  - Woodland, December 3, 2016, banned in all enclosed workplaces, including all bars and restaurants
  - Woodville, December 30, 2013, banned in all enclosed workplaces, including all bars and restaurants
  - Yalonusha County, July 3, 2017, banned in all enclosed workplaces, including all bars and restaurants
  - Yazoo City, February 27, 2019, banned in all enclosed workplaces, including all bars and restaurants
- Localities in Mississippi with smoking bans that do not include all bars and restaurants (11 total):
  - Diamondhead, January 1, 2016, banned in all enclosed workplaces, including restaurants but exempting bars
  - Flowood, May 4, 2011, banned in all enclosed workplaces, including restaurants but exempting bars
  - Goodman, June 3, 2010, banned in all enclosed workplaces, including restaurants but exempting bars
  - Gulfport, May 1, 2008, banned in all enclosed workplaces, including restaurants but exempting bars and casinos
  - Hazlehurst, January 19, 2019, banned in all enclosed workplaces except bars and restaurants
  - Leakesville, March 3, 2016, banned in all enclosed workplaces, including restaurants but exempting bars
  - Pearl, September 29, 2010, banned in all restaurants, but not bars or other enclosed workplaces
  - Rienzi, October 5, 2010, banned in all restaurants, but not bars or other enclosed workplaces
  - Ruleville, June 8, 2023, banned in all enclosed workplaces except bars and restaurants
  - Walls, August 1, 2008, banned in all enclosed workplaces, including restaurants but exempting bars
  - West, December 6, 1996, banned in all enclosed workplaces except bars and restaurants

=== Missouri ===
- No statewide smoking ban. Instead, Missouri's 1992 statewide smoking law, the Indoor Clean Air Act, prohibits smoking in all enclosed public places (including workplaces) and public meetings, except in designated smoking areas, which may occupy no more than 30% of the place's enclosed area. Warning signs must be appropriately posted either way. Local governments may prohibit smoking in schools, child daycare facilities, and school buses, as well as in public places. Bars, restaurants that seat fewer than 50 people, bowling alleys, billiard parlors, retail tobacco shops, rooms and halls used for private social functions, limousines and taxicabs where the driver and all passengers agree to smoking, stage performances including smoking, indoor sports stadiums seating more than 15,000 people, and private residences "are not considered a public place".
- Localities in Missouri with a smoking ban that includes all bars and restaurants (37 total):
  - Ballwin, January 2, 2006, banned in all workplaces, including bars, and restaurants; exempts private clubs with no employees.
  - Belton, August 5, 2009, banned in all enclosed public places and workplaces, by public vote in April 2009; exempts business vehicles where all occupants agree to allow smoking, any businesses occupied exclusively by one smoker, private and semiprivate rooms in nursing homes, retail tobacco stores, and private clubs; all existing businesses that allowed smoking were exempt until August 5, 2012; existing bars and restaurants that allowed smoking were exempt until August 5, 2016.
  - Branson, July 1, 2015, banned in all enclosed public places and workplaces by unanimous Board of Aldermen vote in October 2014; exempts up to 20% of designated hotel and motel smoking rooms, tobacco shops, smoking lounges in tobacco-related businesses, private homes, outdoor areas in places of employment, outdoor patios of restaurants, and golf courses.
  - Brentwood, January 1, 2011, banned in all enclosed public places and workplaces, by City Council vote of 7–1 in August 2010; exempts designated hotel and motel smoking rooms, tobacco shops, private homes, and private vehicles.
  - Clayton, July 1, 2010, banned in all enclosed workplaces, including restaurants; exempts tobacco shops, 20% of hotel and motel rooms, and outdoor areas
  - Clinton, March 1, 2015, banned in all enclosed workplaces, including bars and restaurants
  - Chillicothe, January 1, 2008, banned in all bars and restaurants, but not all other workplaces by City Council vote of 4–1, after 56% of voters approved of the idea in a referendum; exempts separately ventilated offices occupied exclusively by smokers.
  - Columbia, January 9, 2007, banned in all workplaces, including bars and restaurants; exempts rented social halls, separately ventilated offices occupied exclusively by smokers, stage performances, retail tobacco shops, and private clubs with no employees.
  - Creve Coeur, January 2, 2011, banned by unanimous city council vote in all enclosed workplaces, including bars and restaurants; exempts cigar bars, private clubs, tobacco shops, and hotel/motel designated smoking rooms
  - Excelsior Springs, July 4, 2013, banned by unanimous City Council vote in all enclosed workplaces, including bars, restaurants, and private clubs; exempts private residences, 25% of hotel and motel rooms, and retail tobacco shops
  - Farmington, November 13, 2015, banned in all enclosed workplaces, including bars and restaurants, after public vote of 59%-41% and including within 15 feet (4.6 m) of entrances; exempts cigar bars, hotel rooms, private clubs, and nursing homes
  - Fulton, January 31, 2011, banned in all enclosed workplaces, including bars and restaurants, after public vote of 53.85%–46.15%.
  - Gainesville, June 9, 2014, banned in all enclosed workplaces, including bars and restaurants
  - Grandview, January 1, 2012, banned in all enclosed workplaces, including restaurants; bars were exempt until August 2016; exempts private residences and vehicles, nursing homes, outdoor areas, private clubs, and designated smoking rooms in hotels and motels
  - Hannibal, October 4, 2012, banned in all enclosed workplaces, including bars and restaurants, after public vote of 55.8%–44.2%; exempts designated smoking rooms in hotels and motels, private residences, private clubs, outdoor areas, and retail tobacco stores.
  - Higginsville, May 1, 2018, banned in all enclosed workplaces, including bars and restaurants; exempts smoking in an entire room or hall which is used for private social functions, a private ventilated offices, onstage performers, and patios
  - Independence, March 17, 2007, banned in all workplaces, including bars and restaurants, per referendum in November 2006; exempts private and semiprivate rooms in nursing homes occupied exclusively by smokers.
  - Jefferson City, January 31, 2011, banned in all enclosed workplaces, including bars and restaurants, after public vote of 58%–42%.
  - Kansas City, June 7, 2008, banned in all indoor workplaces, except casino gaming floors and establishments receiving more than 80% of their revenue from tobacco but neither sell nor serve food or beverages, after public vote of 52%–48% but halted by the Circuit Court of Jackson County on June 4, 2008, after businesses sued Kansas City on the grounds that state law permitted them to allow smoking; and then reinstated by the court on June 21, 2008. On June 23, 2009, the Missouri Court of Appeals ruled that Kansas City's ban on smoking did not conflict with the state's Indoor Clean Air Act, and the Supreme Court of Missouri declined to hear an appeal from that decision.
  - Kearney, October 1, 2015, banned in all enclosed workplaces, including bars and restaurants; smoking is allowed only on patios of businesses as well as outdoor areas of the Kearney Amphitheater; vaping is allowed in all smoke-free areas
  - Kennett, April 16, 2014, banned by 8–1 vote of city council in all enclosed workplaces, including all restaurants; exempts bars and taverns, outdoor areas, retail tobacco shops, 25% of hotel and motel rooms, and private residences
  - Kirksville, July 1, 2007, banned in all workplaces, including bars and restaurants; exempts private clubs.
  - Kirkwood, January 2, 2010, banned in all enclosed workplaces, including all bars and restaurants, after public vote of 65%–35%; exempts private clubs, private residences, private vehicles, smoking rooms in hotels and motels, and retail tobacco stores.
  - Lake Saint Louis, September 30, 2010, banned in all enclosed workplaces, including all bars and restaurants, by Board of Aldermen vote of 4–2 on March 15, 2010; exempts designated hotel/motel smoking rooms, private clubs with no employees, outdoor areas, cigar bars, and retail tobacco stores.
  - Lee's Summit, December 8, 2006, banned in all workplaces, including bars and restaurants, per referendum in November 2006; exempts private and semiprivate rooms in nursing homes occupied exclusively by smokers, retail tobacco stores, and private clubs.
  - Liberty, January 2, 2010, banned in all workplaces, including bars and restaurants, and in public parks, by public vote of 2,684 yes to 1,127 no; exempts outdoor patios, private residences, and smoking rooms in hotels and motels.
  - Maryville, October 1, 2010, banned in all enclosed workplaces, including bars and restaurants, by a city council vote of 3–2.
  - Nevada, January 1, 2018, banned in all enclosed workplaces, including bars, restaurants, and private clubs; exempts 20% of hotel/motel rooms contiguous and all on one floor and provide no infiltration of smoke to other rooms anywhere within the premises.
  - North Kansas City, July 10, 2008, banned in all workplaces, including bars and restaurants; exempts casinos and retail tobacco shops
  - O'Fallon, June 4, 2011, banned in all enclosed workplaces, including all bars restaurants, after public vote of 73%–27% on April 5, 2011; exempts cigar bars, private clubs, retail tobacco stores, private residences, outdoor areas, and 20% of hotel and motel rooms.
  - Rolla, January 1, 2012, banned in all enclosed workplaces, including bars and restaurants, by a city council vote of 8–4 on June 6, 2011; exempts private clubs with no employees, outdoor areas, designated hotel/motel smoking rooms, and private homes and vehicles
  - St. Joseph, June 7, 2014, banned in all enclosed workplaces and public places, including all bars, restaurants, and private and semiprivate rooms in nursing homes, after public vote of 52.75%–47.25%; exempts private vehicles and residences, 10% of hotel and motel rooms designated as smoking, private clubs (when no employees are present), and casino gaming areas (including bars, restaurants, and lounges within those gaming areas).
  - St. Louis, January 2, 2011, banned in all enclosed workplaces, including bars and restaurants; indefinitely exempts casino gaming floors and VIP lounges (unless St. Louis County and St. Charles County or St. Charles city also prohibit casino gaming floors), private clubs with no employees, retail tobacco stores, designated hotel/motel smoking rooms, private residences, and outdoor areas; bars in existence on January 2, 2011, that were less than 2,000 square feet (190 m^{2}) and did not allow under-21 patrons were exempt until January 2, 2016. On September 14, 2012, the St. Louis Health Department issued an order further permanently exempting the Missouri Athletic Club from the city's smoking ban.
  - Sedalia, September 1, 2013, banned in most enclosed workplaces, including most areas of bars and restaurants, as well as city parks and outdoor recreation areas, by a city council vote of 6–2 on June 17, 2013; exempts 50% of undefined "patio area" space in any bar or restaurant, private clubs, small workplaces (those with one employee), work vehicles where all passengers consent to allow smoking, private residences, private vehicles, designated hotel and motel smoking rooms, private and semiprivate rooms in nursing homes, and retail tobacco stores.
  - Springfield, June 11, 2011, banned in all enclosed workplaces, including all restaurants, bars, and retail tobacco shops, after public vote of 53%–47% on April 5, 2011; exempts only private residences and 20% of hotel and motel rooms, but partially repealed by unanimous vote of the City Council on May 7, 2012, to exempt cigar bars, tobacco shops, and private clubs.
  - Warrensburg, November 30, 2010, banned in all enclosed workplaces, including bars and restaurants; exempts private clubs, retail tobacco stores, any stores whose revenue is at least 80% from tobacco, stage performances involving smoking, designated smoking areas in institutions of higher education, outdoor patios, designated hotel/motel smoking rooms, and private residences.
  - Washington, April 15, 2013, banned in all enclosed workplaces, including bars and restaurants by unanimous city council vote; also banned in private rooms in nursing homes; exempts only private residences not serving as a workplace and designated smoking rooms in hotels and motels; exempts hookah lounges until April 15, 2014.
- Localities in Missouri with a smoking ban that does not include all bars and restaurants (9 total):
  - Arnold, November 1, 2004, banned in all restaurants/restaurant-bars seating 50 people or more, except in separately ventilated smoking rooms; does not touch standalone bars or other places; exempts any establishment otherwise classified as a restaurant, that receives 70% or more of its revenue from alcohol sales
  - Blue Springs, May 1, 2008, banned in all enclosed workplaces, including most restaurants; exempts bars, restaurants that seat less than 50 people, restaurants that receive less than 60% of their revenue from food sales, bowling alleys, bingo halls during bingo games, rented social halls, private dances open to the public, and retail tobacco shops.
  - Gladstone, May 24, 2009, banned by City Council vote of 4–1 in all enclosed workplaces and city parks; exempts any business existing and licensed to serve liquor on January 1, 2009, that customarily allows smoking and remains under the same ownership; further exempts all bars, taverns, restaurants seating less than 50 people, billiard parlors, bowling alleys, retail tobacco shops, rented social halls, taxicabs and limousines where both driver and passengers agree to allow smoking, stage performances involving smoking, private clubs, private and semiprivate rooms in nursing homes occupied exclusively by smokers, and a percentage of hotel and motel rooms.
  - Hazelwood, January 19, 2011, banned in all enclosed workplaces, exempting bars and some restaurants; exempts private clubs, smoking during stage productions, nursing homes, retail tobacco stores, designated smoking rooms in hotels and motels, cigar bars, and any liquor licensee that receives less than 25% of its revenue from food sales
  - Nixa, June 8, 2007, banned in all workplaces, including restaurants; exempts rented social halls, taxicabs and limousines where both driver and passengers agree to allow smoking, stage performances, designated areas of shopping malls, retail tobacco shops, and designated employee smoking areas not accessible to the general public.
  - Parkville, October 2, 2009, banned in all enclosed public places and workplaces by Board of Aldermen; exempts all bars, taverns, restaurants seating less than 50 people, billiard parlors, bowling alleys, retail tobacco shops, rented social halls, taxicabs and limousines where both driver and passengers agree to allow smoking, stage performances involving smoking, and private clubs.
  - Raymore, August 22, 2008, banned in all public places and within 100 feet (30 m) of the entrance to public places (except on outdoor patios), including most restaurants; exempts bars, restaurants with bars, private clubs, stage performances, restaurants that seat fewer than 50 people, bowling alleys, billiard parlors, taxicabs and limousines where both driver and passengers agree to allow smoking, and retail tobacco shops.
  - St. Louis County, January 2, 2011, banned in all enclosed workplaces, including restaurants, after public vote of 65%–35% on November 3, 2009; exempts certain drinking establishments (bars having 25% or less gross sales of food, were in existence on January 2, 2011, and have applied for a smoking exemption certificate), cigar bars, casino gaming floors, private clubs, performing on stage as part of a theatrical production, private and semi-private rooms in nursing homes and rest homes, retail tobacco shops, smoking rooms in hotels and motels, and smoking lounges at Lambert-St. Louis International Airport.
  - West Plains, May 1, 2016, banned in all restaurants; exempts limousines for hire and taxicabs, where the driver and all passengers affirmatively consent to smoking in such vehicle, performers upon the stage, provided the smoking is part of a theatrical production, any licensed establishment which serves liquor on the premises for which not more than ten percent (10%) of the gross sales receipts of the business are supplied by food purchases, either for consumption on the premises or elsewhere, private residences, except when used as a childcare facility, adult day care, or health care facility, and not more than twenty percent (20%) of hotel and motel rooms as defined in this ordinance and designated as smoking rooms, which must be contiguous and smoke from these rooms must not infiltrate into areas where smoking is prohibited.

=== Montana ===
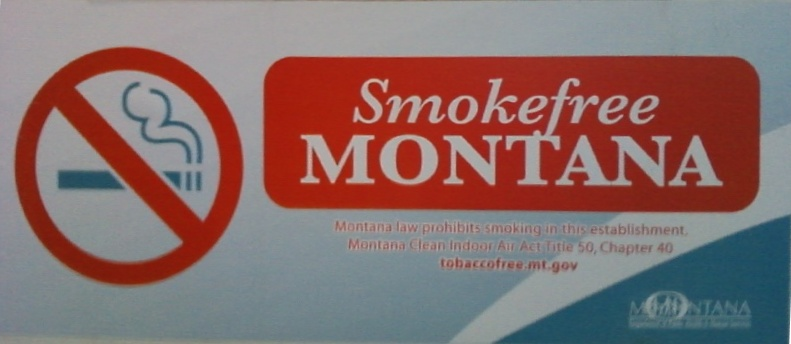
Smokefree Montana sticker

- Statewide smoking ban: On October 1, 2005, the Montana Clean Indoor Air Act (MCIAA) went into effect, banning smoking statewide in all enclosed workplaces in Montana including restaurants, though bars were exempt until October 1, 2009; the word "bar" is defined in the Act as also including taverns, night clubs, cocktail lounges, and casinos. The act exempts private residences not used as a daycare facility or healthcare facility, private motor vehicles, tobacco demonstrations in schools, designated hotel/motel smoking rooms, and American Indian religious and cultural activities. Local governments are preempted from regulating smoking more stringently than the Act.

=== Nebraska ===
- Statewide smoking ban: On June 1, 2009, the Nebraska Clean Indoor Air Act passed in February 2008 went into effect, banning smoking statewide in all enclosed workplaces in Nebraska, including all bars and restaurants. The Act exempts tobacco retail stores, designated hotel/motel smoking rooms, private residences, and places where scientific research about smoking is occurring. In April 2009, the Act was amended to further exempt cigar bars, as well. Local governments may regulate smoking more stringently than the Act.

=== Nevada ===
- Statewide smoking ban excluding bars, casinos, and designated restaurant smoking rooms: On December 8, 2006, after passage by 54% of voters on November 7, 2006, the Nevada Clean Indoor Air Act went into effect, banning smoking statewide in all enclosed workplaces. The act passed by voters initially included all restaurants as well as bars that serve food. The Act permits smoking without limitation in areas within casinos where minors are already prohibited, stand-alone bars that do not serve food, strip clubs and brothels, retail tobacco stores, and private residences (including those that serve as an office workplace, unless used as a childcare, adult daycare, or healthcare facility). Local governments may regulate smoking more stringently than the Act, though no city or county in Nevada has chosen to do so. In 2009 Nevada partially repealed the ban to allow smoking in tobacco-related trade conventions. The ban was further amended in 2011 to allow smoking in taverns that serve alcohol and food as long as patrons under 21 are not allowed in. Smoking is also now allowed in designated areas of family restaurants if the smoking area is physically enclosed and separated from the non-smoking area and minors are prohibited inside.

=== New Hampshire ===
- Statewide ban on smoking in bars, restaurants, and some other workplaces: On September 17, 2007, the Indoor Smoking Act went into effect, banning smoking in schools, child daycare facilities, grocery stores, elevators and public conveyances (except when rented for private purposes), restaurants, bars, and private clubs when open to the public. Private clubs and religious and fraternal organizations (including bars and restaurants inside these places), hotel and motel rooms, rented halls and rooms under control of the renter, college dormitory rooms, public housing, nursing homes, areas designated by hospitals, and alcohol/drug rehabilitation facilities are exempt from smoking regulation and can allow smoking indoors freely. All other places must designate smoking and nonsmoking areas and post appropriate signs. On January 1, 2010, House Bill 392 went into effect. It established an on-premises cigar, beverage, and liquor license and allowed for cigar smoking at public cigar bars. Towns only can regulate smoking more strictly with regard to fire safety and sanitation. In 2003, the New Hampshire Supreme Court ruled that this means state law preempts towns from enacting stricter local smoking bans for health reasons.

=== New Jersey ===
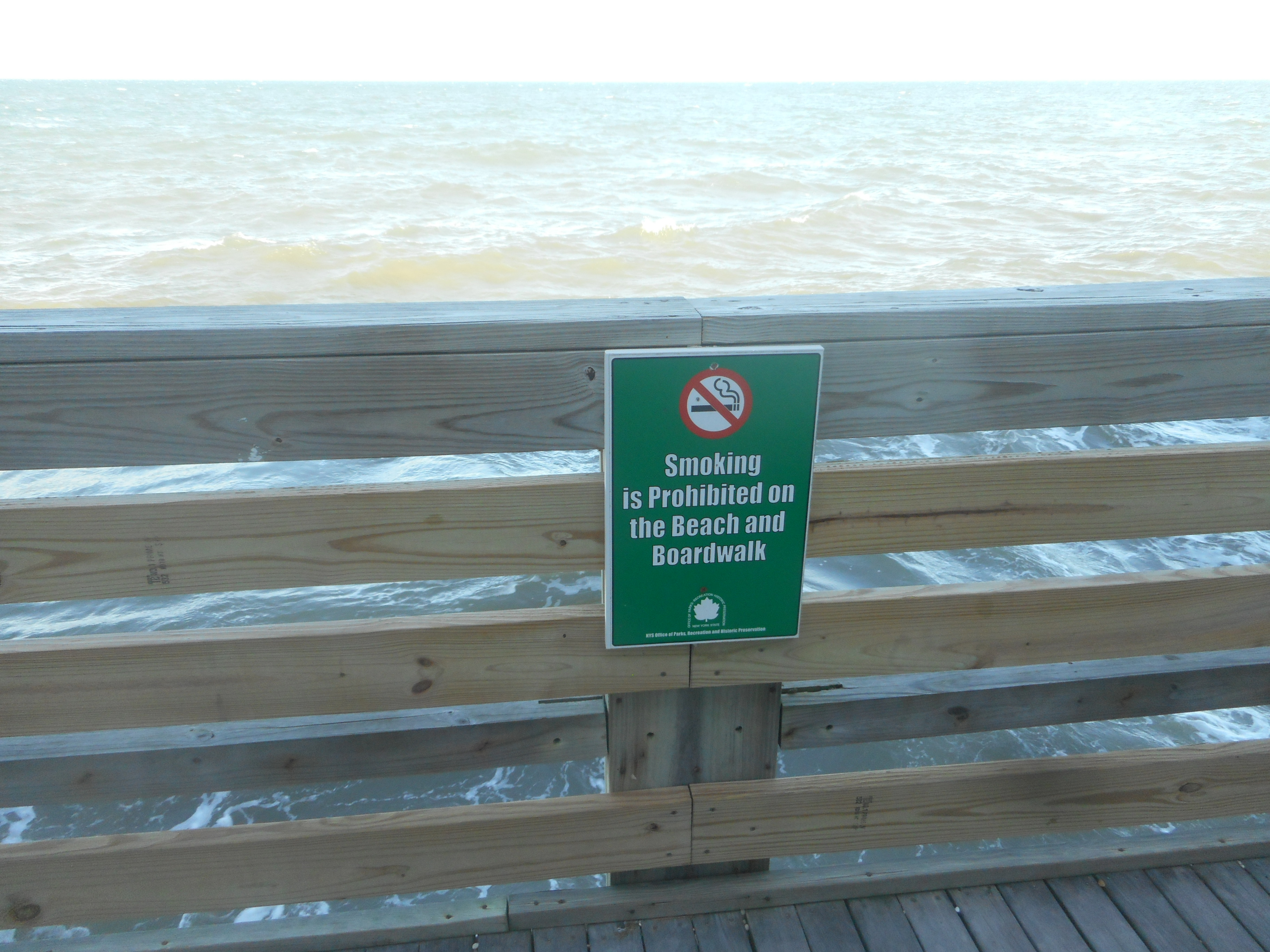
No Smoking sign on the boardwalk of Wildwood State Park

- Statewide smoking ban: On April 15, 2006, the New Jersey Smoke-Free Air Act went into effect, banning smoking statewide in all enclosed workplaces in New Jersey, including all bars and restaurants, strip clubs, hospitals, psychiatric facilities, as well as outside portions of school grounds. The Act exempts cigar bars, tobacco retail stores, tobacco manufacturing facilities, private residences and private automobiles, off-track betting parlors, and designated hotel/motel smoking rooms. Local governments may regulate smoking more stringently than the Act. On January 16, 2019, smoking was outlawed on all public beaches and in state parks. Violating the Act can result in a fine of between $250 and $1,000, depending how many violations one has incurred within a year.
- Atlantic City, banned on 75% of casino gaming floors.
- Pequannock, banned in public parks with ball-fields or playgrounds in July 2011 through ordinance introduced by Mayor Rich Phelan.

=== New Mexico ===
Sign outside DeVargas Center describing Santa Fe, New Mexico's smoking ordinance

- Statewide smoking ban: On June 15, 2007, the Dee Johnson Clean Indoor Air Act went into effect, banning smoking statewide in all enclosed workplaces in New Mexico, including all bars and restaurants, as well as within a "reasonable distance" of the entrances to those places. The Act exempts (1) private residences except when being used to provide commercial childcare, adult care, or healthcare, (2) retail tobacco stores, (3) cigar bars, (4) tobacco manufacturing facilities, (5) casinos, (6) quit-smoking programs, (7) designated outdoor smoking areas, (8) private clubs, (9) limousines under private hire, (10) designated hotel/motel smoking rooms, (11) enclosed areas within restaurants, bars, and hotel/motel conference/meeting rooms that are being used for private functions, (12) cultural or ceremonial activities by American Indians, (13) non-bar/restaurant businesses with fewer than two employees that is not usually accessible to the public and all employees agree to allow smoking, and (14) stage, motion picture, or television productions involving smoking as part of the production. Penalties are $100 for a first violation, $200 for a second violation within 12 months and $500 for the third and subsequent violations. Local governments may regulate smoking more stringently than the Act.

=== New York ===
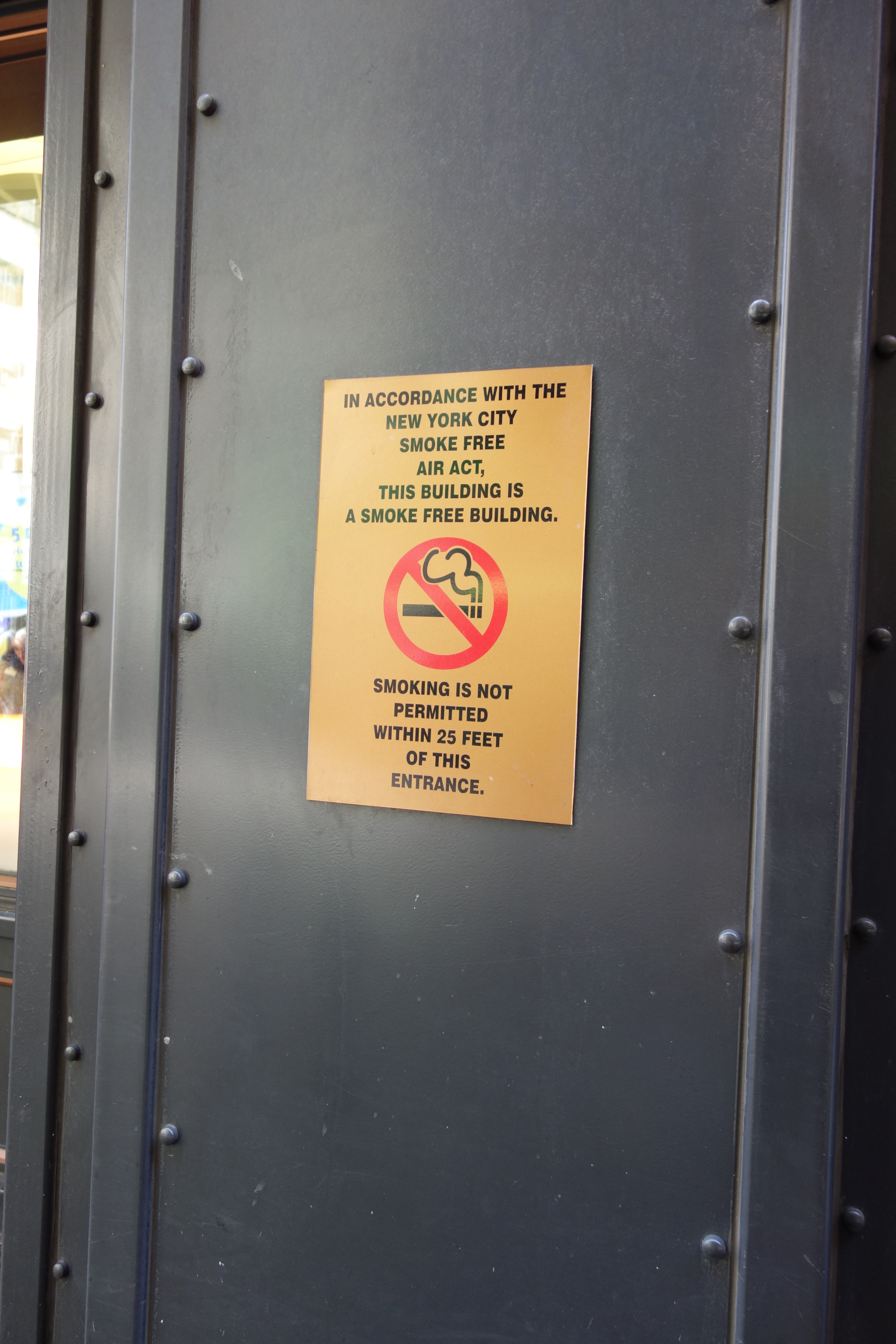
Sign outside the Corbin Building describing New York City's smoking ban

- Statewide smoking ban: Effective July 24, 2003, smoking is banned statewide in all enclosed workplaces in New York, including all bars and restaurants and construction sites. The law exempts (1) private homes and automobiles, (2) hotel/motel rooms, (3) retail tobacco businesses, (4) private clubs, (5) cigar bars (A cigar bar that makes 10 percent of its gross income from the on-site sale of tobacco products and the rental of on-site humidors, not including vending machines sales are exempt from the ban), (6) outdoor areas of bars and restaurants, and (7) enclosed rooms in restaurants, bars, convention halls, etc., when hosting private functions organized for the promotion and sampling of tobacco products. Local governments may regulate smoking more stringently than the state law. Breaking the state law can result in a fine of between $200 and $2,000, depending how many violations one has had within a year.
  - Albany, On January 1, 2015, the following ordinance took effect. "No person shall smoke within the City's parks, sport fields, swimming pools, or playgrounds. For purposes of this section, to 'smoke' means to burn a lighted cigar, cigarette, or pipe or to use any other substance which contains tobacco."
  - Great Neck, Adopted January 4, 2011, smoking was banned on sidewalks in front of commercial buildings, Village Green park, and the Housing Authority.
  - New York City, Effective May 23, 2011, smoking was banned in all parks, boardwalks, beaches, recreation centers, swimming pools and pedestrian plazas. On March 30, 2003, smoking was banned in all enclosed workplaces, including bars and restaurants; exempts tobacco bars, owner-operated bars, separately ventilated smoking rooms in bars, private clubs with no employees, private functions organized for the promotion and sampling of tobacco products, and retail tobacco shops. Shortly after, on July 24, 2003, the statewide smoking ban came into effect. New York City may suspend or revoke a business's license if it has been found guilty of violating this law three times within 12 months. In 2021, the New York State Clean Indoor Air Act was amended to include the prohibition of smoking and vaping cannabis in all locations where smoking and vaping tobacco products are prohibited.

=== North Carolina ===
- Statewide smoking ban in bars and restaurants: On January 2, 2010, after being signed into law by Governor Bev Perdue on May 19, 2009, North Carolina Session Law 2009-27 went into effect, banning smoking statewide in all bars and restaurants in North Carolina, as well as in government buildings and vehicles. The law exempts cigar bars, private clubs that are not-for-profit (including country clubs), designated hotel/motel smoking areas, offices, retail stores not subjected to state sanitation codes, and medical research facilities studying tobacco. The law generally allows local governments to regulate smoking more strictly beginning July 5, 2009 (as long as it is approved by the county, too), but preempts local governments from regulating smoking in cigar bars, retail tobacco shops, tobacco manufacturer facilities, designated hotel/motel smoking rooms, private clubs (including country clubs), theatrical productions involving smoking, private residences, or private vehicles.
- Other local smoking regulations in North Carolina:
  - North Carolina Department of Correction, January 2006, banned in all state prisons.
  - Orange County, January 1, 2012, banned on all sidewalks owned, operated, or maintained by the municipalities incorporated within the county.
  - UNC Hospitals, August 2007, banned on all hospital grounds.
  - Waynesville, May 23, 2015, banned on sidewalks, public parks, parking lots, greenways, city vehicles and the area in and surrounding town buildings
  - Durham County, January 1, 2016, ban on smoking, including the use of e-cigarettes in public outdoor spaces.
    - Includes Parks, Trails, Public Sidewalks, Bus stops, Public areas of retail establishments, and childcare facilities.
  - Duke University Health System, July 2007, banned on all hospital grounds.
    - As of July 1, 2020, smoke free policy expanded to include the use of all tobacco products, including cigarettes, cigars, hookah, e-cigarettes (vapes), chewing tobacco, snuff, snus, and IQOS.
    - This includes all employees, faculty, patients, visitors, volunteers, students, and vendors on any Duke owned or leased properties.
  - Duke University, July 1, 2020, ban on all tobacco products on campus, including in University residence halls. This includes cigarettes, hookahs, e-cigarettes (vapes), chewing tobacco, snuff, snus, etc.

=== North Dakota ===
- Statewide smoking ban: On November 6, 2012, by a vote of 66%–34%, North Dakota voters ratified Initiative Measure Four, which, upon taking effect in December 2012, amends North Dakota's existing partial smoking ban so as to ban smoking statewide in all enclosed public places and places of employment, including all bars, restaurants, and tobacco stores. The ban exempts only (1) private residences except when operating as a childcare or adult day care facility, (2) outdoor areas except within 20 feet of the entrance to a public place or place of employment, (3) businesses not open to the public with no employees besides the owner, and (4) American Indian religious and cultural rituals. Local governments may regulate smoking more stringently than the state. As noted above, North Dakota is one of only six states that ban smoking in tobacco stores and is one of only four that prohibit hotels and motels from designating a certain percentage of rooms for smoking.

=== Northern Mariana Islands ===
- Partial territory-wide smoking ban. Since September 29, 2009, smoking has been banned for most workplaces and restaurants, but not bars.

=== Ohio ===
- Statewide smoking ban: On December 7, 2006, after passage by Ohio voters on November 7, 2006, Chapter 3794 (titled "Smoking Ban") of the Ohio Revised Code went into effect, banning smoking statewide in all enclosed workplaces in Ohio, including bars and restaurants. The law exempts (1) private residences except when being used as a business when employees other than the owner are present, (2) designated hotel/motel smoking rooms, (3) family-owned and operated businesses not open to the public where all employees are related to the owner, (4) designated smoking areas in nursing homes, (5) retail tobacco stores, (6) outdoor patios, (7) private clubs with no employees. The law is enforced by the Ohio Department of Health, which began enforcement on May 3, 2007. A business may be fined up to $2,500 and individuals $100 for violation of the ban. Local governments may regulate smoking more stringently than the state.
- North Royalton, April 16, 2008, passed Ordinance 08-69 banning smoking in public outdoor places owned by the city. Smoking areas may be designated at the mayor's discretion.
- Oberlin, June 2010, banned smoking and the use of smokeless tobacco in city parks.

=== Oklahoma ===
- No statewide smoking ban. Instead, Oklahoma's statewide smoking law prohibits smoking in any indoor workplaces – including restaurants and hotels – unless a separate ventilation system under negative pressure is installed for ventilating the smoking area, but permits smoking without limitation in bars, private clubs, bingo halls, retail tobacco stores, small family-owned workplaces, workplaces occupied exclusively by smokers, veterans' halls, and designated employee smoking areas. The Oklahoma law expressly preempts local governments from enacting any local smoking regulations that are not exactly the same as the state law.

=== Oregon ===
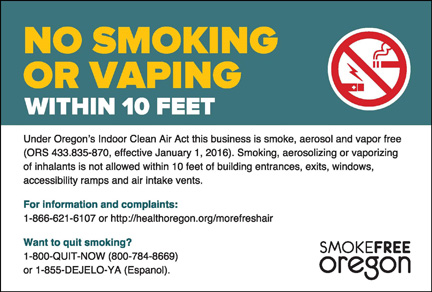
Sign describing the Oregon Indoor Clean Air Act, which is required to be posted at all entrances and exits in workplaces.

- Statewide smoking ban: Effective January 1, 2009, after being signed into law on June 26, 2007, the 1981 Oregon Indoor Clean Air Act (as previously amended in 2001) was amended to ban smoking statewide in all enclosed workplaces in Oregon, including bars and restaurants, as well as within 10 feet (3.0 m) of the entrances, exits, open windows, or intake vents of such places. The Act exempts (1) private residences except when serving as a childcare or adult care facility, (2) designated hotel/motel smoking rooms, (3) spaces designated for traditional American Indian religious and cultural ceremonies, (4) retail tobacco shops, and (5) cigar bars. Local governments may regulate smoking more stringently than the Act; and the Oregon Court of Appeals reiterated this in 2000. Effective January 1, 2014, smoking is banned in vehicles with passengers under 18 inside. Oregon requires signage explaining the law to be posted at the entrances and exits of all workplaces.

=== Pennsylvania ===
- Statewide smoking ban excluding some bars. Effective September 11, 2008, after being signed into law by Governor Ed Rendell on June 13, 2008, Pennsylvania's 1988 Clean Indoor Air Act was amended to ban smoking statewide in all restaurants and other enclosed workplaces in Pennsylvania, except as exempted. The Act exempts (1) eating/drinking establishments where 20% or less of sales come from food AND persons under 18 are not allowed, (2) private homes and vehicles, except those used as a child daycare or adult care facility, (3) designated hotel/motel smoking rooms, (4) full service truck stops, (5) retail tobacco shops, (6) workplaces of tobacco manufacturers and wholesalers, (7) nursing homes, (8) designated smoking areas in day treatment facilities, psychiatric facilities, and healthcare facilities, (9) private clubs when public events are not being held, including volunteer fire, ambulance, and rescue stations, (10) tobacco-related fundraisers, (11) places rented for tobacco exhibitions, (12) cigar bars, (13) 25% of a casino gaming floor, and (14) outdoor areas. Local governments except Philadelphia are preempted from regulating smoking more stringently than the Act. However, exempt drinking establishments, cigar bars, and such must apply for an exemption with documentation and be approved before allowing smoking. As a result, most bars are not exempt and smoking is banned in most bars and restaurants in Pennsylvania and almost all bars in Philadelphia by local ordinance. From 2009 to 2019, the number of exempt drinking establishments in the state dropped from 2,900 to 1,200.

Philadelphia's smoking ordinance, which went into effect on January 8, 2007, bans smoking in all restaurants, exempting bars where food accounts for less than 10% of sales and alcohol accounts for more than 90% of sales, and persons under 18 are prohibited. As with the state ban, to receive exemption bars must apply for and receive the exemption. Philadelphia's ordinance is the only local smoking ban in Pennsylvania. On April 29, 2014, Mayor Michael Nutter passed an executive order banning smoking in all city parks.

- 'Smoke-Free Beaches' Program: Pennsylvania's 'Smoke-Free Beaches' program was initiated by the Pennsylvania Department of Conservation and Natural Resources. This program places smoking constraints at designated parks to eliminate smoking on beaches and swimming areas. For visitors who smoke and still want to use these beaches, designated areas adjacent to the beach are provided. The restriction includes cigarettes, pipes, cigars and the increasingly popular e-cigarettes. Staff at newly affected parks have been preparing for the change by purchasing and installing butt disposal units; installing new signage; establishing designated smoking areas with seating; and informing park user and support groups.
  - In 2016, 12 state parks initiated new "Smoke Free Beaches". They were: Hills Creek, Tioga County; Lyman Run, Potter County; R.B. Winter, Union; Presque Isle, Erie; Pymatuning, Crawford, Laurel Hill, Somerset County; Whipple Dam, Huntingdon County; Gifford Pinchot, York County; Cowans Gap, Fulton County; Gouldsboro, Monroe County; Ricketts Glen, Luzerne County; and Worlds End, Sullivan.

=== Puerto Rico ===
- Territory-wide smoking ban: Effective March 2, 2007, smoking is banned territory-wide in all enclosed workplaces in Puerto Rico, including bars and restaurants, as well as private vehicles when either a minor in a car seat or a child under 13 is present. The law exempts (1) retail tobacco stores, (2) theater and film productions and presentations in which actors smoke as part of their character, (3) private homes except when serving as a workplace, and (4) designated hotel/motel smoking rooms.

=== Rhode Island ===
- Statewide smoking ban: On March 1, 2005, the Public Health and Workplace Safety Act went into effect, banning smoking statewide in all enclosed workplaces in Rhode Island, including bars and restaurants. The Act exempts (1) smoking bars (income over 50% tobacco products), (2) outdoor areas, (3) private and semiprivate rooms in nursing homes, (4) retail tobacco stores, (5) stage performances involving smoking, (6) hotel and motel rooms designated as smoking rooms, (7) private residences, except used as a licensed child care, adult daycare, or healthcare facility, and (8) the two state-licensed gambling facilities, Newport Grand and Twin River Casino. Local governments may regulate smoking more strictly than the Act, though as of April 2009 none have chosen to do so.

=== South Carolina ===
- No statewide smoking ban. Instead, South Carolina's 1990 statewide smoking law, the Clean Indoor Air Law, generally prohibits smoking only in (1) public schools, excluding offices and teacher lounges (unless a local school board says otherwise), (2) childcare facilities, (3) healthcare facilities, except in designated employee smoking areas (unless the facilities chooses to be smoke-free), (4) government buildings, except in designated employee smoking areas (and except the State Capitol and legislative office buildings), (5) elevators, (6) public transportation vehicles, and (7) public theatres and arenas, except in designated smoking areas in common areas, and in any such designated smoking area warning signs must be appropriately posted. The Act covers no other places. On March 31, 2008, the South Carolina Supreme Court ruled that local governments generally may regulate smoking more stringently than the Act. On September 8, 2008, the South Carolina Supreme Court ruled that the maximum fine a city or town constitutionally can impose for breaking a local smoking ban is $25.
- Localities in South Carolina with smoking bans that include all bars and restaurants (63 total as of April 1, 2019):
  - Aiken, July 14, 2008, banned in all enclosed workplaces, including bars and restaurants
  - Aiken County, September 16, 2008, banned in all enclosed workplaces, including bars and restaurants
  - Atlantic Beach, May 2, 2011, prohibited in all bars and restaurants, but not in all other workplaces
  - Beaufort, May 27, 2008, prohibited in all enclosed workplaces, including bars and restaurants
  - Beaufort County, January 10, 2007, prohibited in all workplaces, including bars and restaurants, within unincorporated areas of Beaufort County
  - Blacksburg, September 12, 2017, banned in all enclosed workplaces, including bars and restaurants
  - Blackville, September 19, 2018, banned in all enclosed workplaces, including bars and restaurants
  - Camden, September 22, 2008, banned in all enclosed workplaces, including bars and restaurants
  - Cayce, June 1, 2010, banned in all enclosed workplaces, including bars and restaurants
  - Chapin, August 3, 2010, banned in all enclosed workplaces, including bars and restaurants
  - Charleston, July 23, 2007, banned in all enclosed workplaces, including bars and restaurants; exempts cigar bars, theatrical performances involving smoking, and 25% of designated hotel and motel smoking rooms
  - Charleston County, September 1, 2012, banned in all bars and restaurants, but not in all other workplaces
  - Chesnee, August 9, 2010, banned in all enclosed workplaces, including bars and restaurants
  - Clemson, July 1, 2008, banned in all bars and restaurants, but not in all other workplaces
  - Clinton, March 1, 2015, banned in all enclosed workplaces, including bars and restaurants
  - Colleton County, July 28, 2015, banned in all enclosed workplaces, including all bars and restaurants
  - Columbia, October 1, 2008, banned in all enclosed workplaces, including bars and restaurants
  - Denmark, August 18, 2014, banned in all enclosed workplaces, including bars and restaurants
  - Duncan, November 17, 2015, banned in all bars and restaurants, but not other workplaces
  - Easley, January 1, 2009, banned in all enclosed workplaces, including bars and restaurants
  - Edisto Beach, March 1, 2009, banned in all enclosed workplaces, including bars and restaurants
  - Estill, May 1, 2013, banned in all enclosed workplaces, including all bars and restaurants
  - Florence, November 1, 2011, banned in bars and restaurants but allows workplaces and other privately owned businesses to establish designated break rooms for smoking that are enclosed and separately ventilated from the rest of the establishment in order to be exempt from the law
  - Fort Mill, August 1, 2009, banned in all enclosed workplaces, including bars and restaurants
  - Goose Creek, July 1, 2013, banned in all enclosed workplaces, including all bars and restaurants
  - Greenville, January 1, 2007, banned in all enclosed workplaces, including bars and restaurants and has placed a ban for outdoor smoking within city limits
  - Hampton, January 1, 2012, banned in all enclosed workplaces, including bars and restaurants
  - Hartsville, October 10, 2012, banned in all enclosed workplaces, including bars and restaurants
  - Heath Springs, May 28, 2013, banned in all enclosed workplaces, including all bars and restaurants
  - Hilton Head Island, May 1, 2007, banned in all bars and restaurants, but not in all other workplaces
  - Hollywood, July 26, 2010, banned in all enclosed workplaces, including bars and restaurants
  - Inman, April 8, 2015, banned in all enclosed workplaces, including all bars and restaurants
  - Isle of Palms, January 1, 2009, banned in all bars and restaurants, but not in all other workplaces
  - Kershaw, March 18, 2013, banned in all enclosed workplaces, including all bars and restaurants
  - Lancaster, October 22, 2013, banned in all enclosed workplaces, including all bars and restaurants
  - Lancaster County, March 1, 2013, banned in all enclosed workplaces, including all bars and restaurants
  - Lexington, October 3, 2009, banned in all enclosed workplaces, including bars and restaurants
  - Lexington County, January 1, 2010, banned in all enclosed workplaces, including bars and restaurants
  - Mount Pleasant, September 1, 2007, banned in all bars, restaurants, and private clubs, but not in all other workplaces
  - North Augusta, August 1, 2009, banned in all enclosed workplaces, including bars and restaurants
  - North Myrtle Beach, March 7, 2012, banned in all enclosed workplaces, including bars and restaurants; theatrical performances and tobacco bars are exempt from the ordinance; further exempts use of e-cigarettes
  - Pendleton, February 1, 2012, banned in all bars and restaurants, but not in other workplaces
  - Pickens, May 1, 2009, banned in all enclosed workplaces, including bars and restaurants
  - Pine Ridge, January 1, 2010, banned in all enclosed workplaces, including bars and restaurants
  - Prosperity, January 16, 2018, banned in all enclosed workplaces, including bars and restaurants
  - Quinby, March 1, 2012, banned in bars and restaurants but allows workplaces and other privately owned businesses to establish designated break rooms for smoking that are enclosed and separately ventilated from the rest of the establishment in order to be exempt from the law
  - Ravenel, April 27, 2010, banned in all bars and restaurants, but not in all other workplaces
  - Richland County, October 1, 2009, banned in all enclosed workplaces, including bars and restaurants
  - Rock Hill, May 1, 2009, banned in all enclosed workplaces, including bars and restaurants
  - Simpsonville, September 1, 2012, banned in all enclosed workplaces, including bars and restaurants
  - South Congaree, May 18, 2010, banned in all enclosed workplaces, including bars and restaurants
  - Spartanburg, September 1, 2011, banned in all enclosed workplaces, including bars and restaurants as well as outdoor functions such as Spring Fling
  - Springdale, January 1, 2010, banned in all enclosed workplaces, including bars and restaurants
  - Sullivan's Island, July 20, 2006, banned in all bars and restaurants, but not in all other workplaces
  - Summerville, July 12, 2011, banned in bars and restaurants, but not in all other workplaces
  - Sumter, April 20, 2009, banned in all enclosed workplaces, including bars and restaurants
  - Surfside Beach, October 1, 2007, banned in all enclosed workplaces, including bars and restaurants
  - Timmonsville, March 1, 2012, banned in bars and restaurants but allows workplaces and other privately owned businesses to establish designated break rooms for smoking that are enclosed and separately ventilated from the rest of the establishment in order to be exempt from the law
  - Walterboro, August 1, 2008, banned in all enclosed workplaces, including bars and restaurants
  - West Columbia, June 1, 2010, banned in all enclosed workplaces, including bars and restaurants
  - West Pelzer, July 2, 2014, banned in all enclosed workplaces, including all bars and restaurants
  - Yemassee, August 9, 2013, banned in all enclosed workplaces, including all bars and restaurants
  - York County, May 1, 2009, banned in all enclosed workplaces, including bars and restaurants
- Localities in South Carolina with a smoking ban that does not include all bars and restaurants (1 total):
  - Liberty, October 9, 2006, banned in all restaurants, but not bars or other enclosed workplaces

=== South Dakota ===
- Statewide smoking ban: South Dakota voters passed 2009 H.B. 1240 on November 10, 2010. The bill bans smoking statewide in all enclosed workplaces in South Dakota, including bars and restaurants, exempting only private residences unless used for child daycare, cigar bars, retail tobacco shops, and a percentage of hotel and motel rooms. The bill was passed in the South Dakota State Legislature and signed into law by Governor Mike Rounds. It was scheduled to take effect in July 2009, but on June 22, 2009, a group of casino and video lottery operators presented the Secretary of State with a petition for a referendum over H.B. 1240 that they claimed to bear 25,000 valid signatures. On June 25, 2009, the Secretary of State certified that the petition indeed bore at least the required 16,776 valid signatures, putting H.B. 1240 to the November 2010 public referendum. On July 24, 2009, the Secretary of State declared that after further review, the number of valid signatures on the petition fell short of the required number to put the issue on the ballot. On November 13, 2009, however, Circuit Judge Kathleen Trandahl ruled that the petition did have enough valid signatures, and ordered the Secretary of State to put the issue to a public vote on November 2, 2010, which ultimately passed. H.B. 1240 is silent as to whether local governments may regulate smoking more stringently, though as of November 2010 no local governments in South Dakota have done so.

=== Tennessee ===
- Statewide smoking ban excluding bars and some restaurants. Tennessee's 2007 statewide smoking law, the Non-Smoker Protection Act, prohibits smoking statewide in all public places in Tennessee, except as exempted; (1) any business, including a bar or restaurant, that does not serve persons under 21, (2) designated hotel/motel smoking rooms, (3) tobacco industry-related facilities, (4) outdoor areas and areas with an open garage door, (5) nursing homes, (6) designated smoking areas not accessible to the general public in businesses with three or fewer employees, (7) private clubs, (8) private residences and vehicles unless it is being used for child care, daycare, or public transportation of children, (9) retail tobacco stores, and (10) commercial vehicles occupied solely by the operator. Local governments in counties with more than 180,000 residents may regulate smoking more strictly than the state.
- Nashville, March 1, 2023, banned in all enclosed workplaces, including bars and restaurants

=== Texas ===
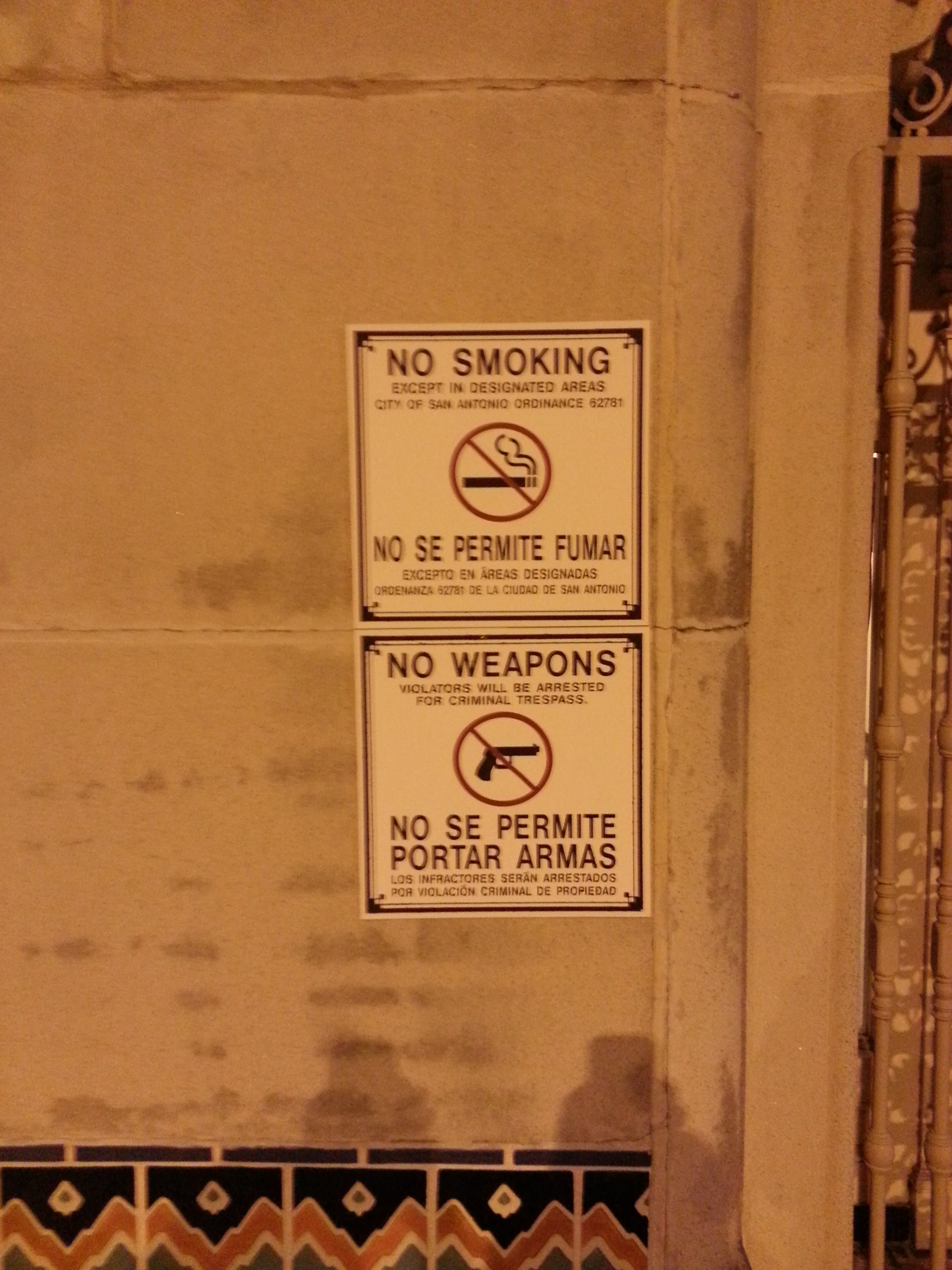
Sign in Downtown San Antonio communicating the city's smoking ordinance

- No statewide smoking ban. Instead, Texas' 1997 statewide smoking law only prohibits smoking in activities of public schools on or off school property, elevators, theatres, libraries, museums, hospitals, buses, airplanes, and trains, as long as these areas are open to the general public, unless the proprietor designates the place for smoking and posts appropriate warning signs. Violation of this law is a class C misdemeanor. Texas law is silent as to whether local governments may regulate smoking more stringently than the state, and on December 9, 2004, the Texas Court of Appeals upheld El Paso's municipal ban on smoking in all bars and restaurants. As of April 1, 2018, 133 cities in Texas have enacted local smoking bans to varying degrees.
- Localities in Texas with a smoking ban including all bars and restaurants (112 total):
  - Abilene, January 3, 2007, banned in all enclosed workplaces, including bars and restaurants
  - Alamo, August 10, 2017, banned in all enclosed workplaces, including bars and restaurants
  - Alton, April 1, 2008, banned in all enclosed workplaces, including bars and restaurants
  - Anthony, October 23, 2017, banned in all enclosed workplaces, including bars and restaurants
  - Arlington, May 19, 2017, banned in all enclosed workplaces, including bars and restaurants
  - Austin, September 1, 2005, after passage by 52% of voters, banned in all enclosed workplaces, including bars and restaurants; exempts bingo halls, fraternities, designated hotel/motel smoking rooms, separately ventilated smoking rooms in bars and restaurants constructed before September 2005, and nursing homes. Struck down as unconstitutionally vague by the United States District Court for the Western District of Texas in 2006, but reinstated on appeal by the United States Court of Appeals for the Fifth Circuit in March 2008.
  - Baytown, November 20, 2006, banned in all enclosed workplaces, including bars and restaurants
  - Beaumont, August 1, 2006, banned in all enclosed workplaces, including bars and restaurants
  - Beeville, February 22, 2018, banned in all enclosed workplaces, including bars and restaurants
  - Benbrook, November 1, 2006, banned in all enclosed workplaces, including bars and restaurants, as well as within 25 feet (7.6 m) of the entrances and exits of such places
  - Bonham, May 11, 2015, banned in bars and restaurants, but not other workplaces
  - Brookshire, June 1, 2017, banned in all enclosed workplaces, including bars and restaurants
  - Brownsville, December 5, 2012, banned in all enclosed workplaces, including bars and restaurants
  - Bryan, May 14, 2019, banned in all enclosed workplaces, including bars and restaurants
  - Burkburnett, May 21, 2015, banned in all enclosed workplaces, including bars and restaurants
  - Burnet, January 15, 2015, banned in bars and restaurants, but not other workplaces
  - College Station, February 1, 2009, banned in all enclosed workplaces including bars, restaurants, and within a 20-foot (6.1 m) radius of entryways except in theater performances or tobacco shop.
  - Combes, May 16, 2018, banned in all enclosed workplaces, including bars and restaurants
  - Copperas Cove, May 18, 2004, banned in all enclosed workplaces, including bars and restaurants; exempts bingo halls (if enclosed non-smoking area is provided), fraternal organizations, designated hotel/motel smoking rooms, and private and semi-private rooms in nursing homes
  - Corpus Christi, April 14, 2009, banned in all enclosed workplaces, including bars and restaurants
  - Dallas, April 10, 2009, banned in all enclosed workplaces, including bars and restaurants
  - Del Rio, June 13, 2017, banned in all enclosed workplaces, including bars and restaurants
  - Denison, July 1, 2017, banned in all enclosed workplaces, including bars and restaurants
  - Denton, August 19, 2015, banned in all enclosed workplaces, including bars and restaurants
  - Desoto, January 1, 2016, banned in all enclosed workplaces, including bars and restaurants
  - Donna, January 3, 2017, banned in all enclosed workplaces, including bars and restaurants
  - Duncanville, May 1, 2016, banned in all enclosed workplaces, including bars and restaurants
  - Eagle Pass, September 28, 2010, banned in all enclosed workplaces, including bars and restaurants
  - Edcouch, January 18, 2018, banned in all enclosed workplaces, including bars and restaurants
  - Edinburg, December 1, 2015, banned in all enclosed workplaces, including bars and restaurants
  - El Cenizo, March 22, 2018, banned in all enclosed workplaces, including bars and restaurants
  - El Lago, January 19, 2009, banned in all bars and restaurants, but not in all other workplaces
  - El Paso, January 2, 2002, banned in all enclosed workplaces, including bars and restaurants
  - Elsa, October 27, 2017, banned in all enclosed workplaces, including bars and restaurants
  - Ennis, June 21, 2010, banned in all enclosed workplaces, including bars and restaurants
  - Escobares, July 9, 2018, banned in all enclosed workplaces, including bars and restaurants
  - Falfurrias, July 6, 2018, banned in all enclosed workplaces, including bars and restaurants
  - Flower Mound, January 1, 2009, banned in all enclosed workplaces, including bars and restaurants
  - Fort Worth, December 12, 2017, banned in all enclosed workplaces, including bars and restaurants
  - Frisco, November 17, 2011, banned in all enclosed workplaces, including bars and restaurants and within 20 feet of entrances to places where smoking is prohibited; exempts hotels/motels that have designated smoking rooms, and retail tobacco stores that have an enclosed, separately ventilated smoking room that exhausts directly to the outside environment
  - Garland, April 3, 2018, banned in all enclosed workplaces, including bars and restaurants
  - Granbury, April 15, 2008, banned in all enclosed workplaces, including bars and restaurants
  - Harlingen, March 23, 2005, banned in all enclosed workplaces, including bars and restaurants
  - Hidalgo, September 10, 2017, banned in all enclosed workplaces, including bars and restaurants
  - Highland Village, June 1, 2011, banned in all enclosed public places as well as restaurants; this municipality is dry
  - Horseshoe Bay, August 25, 2009, banned in all enclosed workplaces, including bars and restaurants
  - Houston, September 1, 2007, banned in all enclosed workplaces, including bars and restaurants; exempts retail tobacco shops, cigar bars, and private function events not open to the public
  - Huntsville, May 12, 2017, banned in all enclosed workplaces, including bars and restaurants
  - Joshua, August 21, 2014, banned in all enclosed public places as well as restaurants; this municipality is dry
  - La Grulla, January 4, 2018, banned in all enclosed workplaces, including bars and restaurants
  - La Joya, August 12, 2017, banned in all enclosed workplaces, including bars and restaurants
  - Lancaster, July 23, 2017, banned in all enclosed workplaces, including bars and restaurants
  - Laredo, July 3, 2006, banned in all enclosed workplaces, including bars and restaurants
  - Lewisville, October 1, 2012, banned in bars and restaurants, but not other workplaces
  - Little Elm, June 17, 2014, banned in all enclosed workplaces, including bars and restaurants
  - Lufkin, April 16, 2013, banned in all enclosed workplaces, including bars and restaurants
  - Lyford, March 24, 2017, banned in all enclosed workplaces, including bars and restaurants
  - Manor, January 3, 2018, banned in bars and restaurants, but not other workplaces
  - Marshall, August 1, 2007, banned in all enclosed workplaces, including bars and restaurants
  - McAllen, January 1, 2018, banned in all enclosed workplaces, including bars and restaurants
  - McKinney, September 4, 2008, banned in all enclosed workplaces, including bars and restaurants; exempts retail tobacco shops and country club smoking rooms, but includes all outdoor areas of parks with the exception of parking lots
  - Mercedes, February 21, 2017, banned in all enclosed workplaces, including bars and restaurants
  - Mesquite, June 14, 2009, banned in bars and restaurants but not other workplaces
  - Mission, September 25, 2016, banned in all enclosed workplaces, including bars and restaurants
  - Missouri City, October 1, 2010, banned in all enclosed workplaces, including bars and restaurants and within 25 feet of entrances to public places; smoking is also prohibited at youth sporting events at city parks as well as within 20 feet
  - Mont Belvieu, October 8, 2018, banned in all enclosed workplaces, including bars and restaurants
  - Nacogdoches, August 27, 2008, banned in all enclosed workplaces, including bars and restaurants
  - New Braunfels, March 13, 2017, banned in all enclosed workplaces, including bars and restaurants; also includes private clubs
  - Nolanville, November 24, 2018, banned in all enclosed workplaces, including bars and restaurants
  - Palmhurst, June 30, 2017, banned in all enclosed workplaces, including bars and restaurants
  - Palmview, May 4, 2017, banned in all enclosed workplaces, including bars and restaurants
  - Panorama Village, January 26, 2010, banned in bars and restaurants, but not other workplaces
  - Patton Village, November 20, 2014, banned in all enclosed public places as well as restaurants; this municipality is dry
  - Pearland, November 30, 2007, banned in all enclosed workplaces, including bars and restaurants; includes city-owned parks and playgrounds and within 25 feet (7.6 m) of entrances, operable windows and ventilation systems of places where smoking is banned
  - Peñitas, April 30, 2017, banned in all enclosed workplaces, including bars and restaurants
  - Pharr, September 13, 2006, banned in all enclosed workplaces, including bars and restaurants
  - Plano, June 1, 2007, banned in all enclosed workplaces, including bars and restaurants
  - Portland, October 3, 2006, banned in all enclosed public places as well as restaurants; this municipality is dry
  - Port Isabel, August 9, 2018, banned in all enclosed workplaces, including bars and restaurants
  - Port Lavaca, November 3, 2015, banned in bars and restaurants, but not other workplaces
  - Prairie View, March 15, 2017, banned in all enclosed workplaces, including bars and restaurants
  - Progreso, June 13, 2018, banned in all enclosed workplaces, including bars and restaurants
  - Raymondville, April 7, 2017, banned in all enclosed workplaces, including bars and restaurants
  - Red Oak, December 14, 2015, banned in all enclosed workplaces, including bars and restaurants
  - Richardson, September 1, 2008, banned in all enclosed workplaces, including bars and restaurants
  - Rio Grande City, August 17, 2018, banned in all enclosed workplaces, including bars and restaurants
  - Rio Hondo, June 24, 2017, banned in all enclosed workplaces, including bars and restaurants
  - Robinson, November 11, 2008, banned in all enclosed workplaces, including bars and restaurants
  - Rollingwood, June 4, 2001, banned in all bars and restaurants, but not in all other workplaces
  - Rowlett, May 1, 2009, banned in all enclosed workplaces, including bars and restaurants
  - San Angelo, December 2, 2010, banned in all enclosed workplaces, including bars and restaurants.
  - San Antonio, August 19, 2011, banned in all enclosed workplaces, including bars and restaurants; exempts cigar bars, outdoor restaurants and bar patio areas, the River Walk, Alamo Plaza, and Main Plaza
  - San Benito, October 21, 2017, banned in all enclosed workplaces, including bars and restaurants
  - San Elizario, June 26, 2018, banned in all enclosed workplaces, including bars and restaurants
  - San Juan, March 16, 2017, banned in all enclosed workplaces, including bars and restaurants
  - San Marcos, January 1, 2015, banned in all enclosed workplaces, including bars and restaurants
  - Seagoville, March 3, 2016, banned in all enclosed workplaces, including bars and restaurants
  - Sherman, July 20, 2015, banned in bars and restaurants, but not other workplaces
  - Socorro, December 8, 2006, banned in all enclosed workplaces, including bars and restaurants
  - Southlake, June 1, 2007, banned in all enclosed workplaces, including bars and restaurants; does not exempt hotel/motel rooms
  - Spring Valley, November 14, 2006, banned in all enclosed workplaces, including bars and restaurants
  - Sullivan City, April 19, 2018, banned in all enclosed workplaces, including bars and restaurants
  - Tyler, June 1, 2008, banned in all enclosed workplaces, including bars and restaurants
  - Universal City, September 16, 2016, banned in all enclosed workplaces, including bars and restaurants
  - University Park, February 16, 2010, banned in bars and restaurants, but not other workplaces
  - Vernon, July 1, 2006, banned in all enclosed workplaces, including bars and restaurants
  - Victoria, June 21, 2006, banned in all enclosed workplaces, including bars and restaurants
  - Waco, January 1, 2016, banned in all enclosed workplaces, including bars and restaurants
  - Waxahachie, September 18, 2014, banned in all enclosed workplaces, including bars and restaurants
  - Weslaco, May 3, 2017, banned in all enclosed workplaces, including bars and restaurants
  - Wichita Falls, June 17, 2016, banned in all enclosed workplaces, including bars and restaurants
  - Woodway, August 14, 2004, banned in all enclosed workplaces, including bars and restaurants
- Localities in Texas with a smoking ban that does not include all bars and restaurants (37 total):
  - Alpine, July 12, 2010, banned in bars, but not restaurants or other enclosed workplaces
  - Angleton, March 1, 2007, banned in all restaurants, but not bars or all other workplaces
  - Athens, April 23, 2012, banned in all enclosed workplaces, exempting bars and restaurants
  - Bedford, January 1, 2015, banned in all restaurants, but not bars or other enclosed workplaces
  - Boerne, March 27, 2007, banned in all restaurants, but not bars or all other workplaces
  - Brenham, July 20, 2007, banned in all restaurants, but not bars or all other workplaces; exempts manufacturing facilities
  - Caldwell, June 1, 2007, banned in all enclosed workplaces, exempting bars and restaurants
  - Conroe, March 1, 2010, banned in all enclosed workplaces, including restaurants but exempting bars
  - Coppell, September 13, 2016, banned in all enclosed workplaces except bars and restaurants
  - Forney, January 31, 2013, banned in restaurants, but not bars or other enclosed workplaces
  - Gainesville, June 6, 2013, banned in all enclosed workplaces, exempting bars and restaurants
  - Galveston, January 1, 2010, banned by City Council in all enclosed workplaces; but on September 23, 2010, City Council repealed smoking ban on bars, private clubs, fraternal organizations, and restaurants. The ban that took effect in 2010 originally included such places.
  - Grand Prairie, January 21, 2014, banned in all restaurants, but not bars or other enclosed workplaces
  - Harlingen, April 2, 2005, banned in all enclosed workplaces, including restaurants but exempting bars
  - Hewitt, November 14, 2010, banned in all enclosed workplaces, exempting bars and restaurants
  - Humble, February 23, 2012, banned in all enclosed workplaces, including restaurants but exempting bars
  - Irving, August 19, 2015, banned in all enclosed workplaces except bars and restaurants
  - Kaufman, October 8, 2007, banned in all enclosed workplaces except bars and restaurants
  - Kerrville, June 24, 2008, banned in bars, but not restaurants or other enclosed workplaces
  - Kilgore, July 9, 2009, banned in all enclosed workplaces, including bars and restaurants that make more than 50% of annual revenue from alcohol sales; also prohibits smoking within 30 feet of places where smoking is prohibited, and provides no exceptions for outdoor patios within bars and restaurants that are non-smoking
  - Killeen, June 1, 2009, banned in all enclosed workplaces, including restaurants but exempting bars
  - North Richland Hills, January 1, 2014, banned in all enclosed workplaces except bars and restaurants
  - Leander, June 1, 2001, banned in all enclosed workplaces except bars and restaurants
  - Palestine, October 26, 2009, banned in all enclosed workplaces, but exempting bars, restaurants, private clubs, designated hotel/motel smoking rooms, bingo halls, and fraternal organizations
  - Paris, March 24, 2014, banned in all enclosed workplaces, including restaurants but exempting bars
  - Pasadena, January 2, 2008, banned in all enclosed workplaces, including restaurants but exempting bars
  - Port Arthur, May 9, 2016, banned in all enclosed workplaces, including restaurants but exempting bars
  - Prosper, September 20, 2007, banned in all restaurants, but not bars or all other workplaces
  - Richardson, September 1, 2008, banned in all enclosed workplaces, exempting bars and restaurants
  - Rockwall, May 1, 2007, banned in all restaurants, but not bars or all other workplaces
  - Rosenberg, April 5, 2011, banned in all enclosed workplaces, including restaurants but exempting bars
  - Round Rock, February 1, 2003, banned in all enclosed workplaces, including restaurants but exempting bars
  - Stafford, August 1, 2013, banned in all enclosed workplaces, exempting bars and restaurants
  - Sugar Land, January 1, 2008, banned in all enclosed workplaces, including restaurants but exempting bars
  - Sweeny, January 1, 2008, banned in all restaurants, but not in bars or all other enclosed workplaces
  - Yoakum, May 12, 2007, voters approved a referendum banning smoking in all enclosed workplaces, exempting bars and restaurants
  - Weatherford, April 26, 2014, banned in all restaurants, but not bars or other enclosed workplaces

=== United States Virgin Islands ===
- Territory-wide smoking ban: Effective February 10, 2011, smoking is banned in all enclosed workplaces, including bars and restaurants, and in outdoor service lines.

=== Utah ===
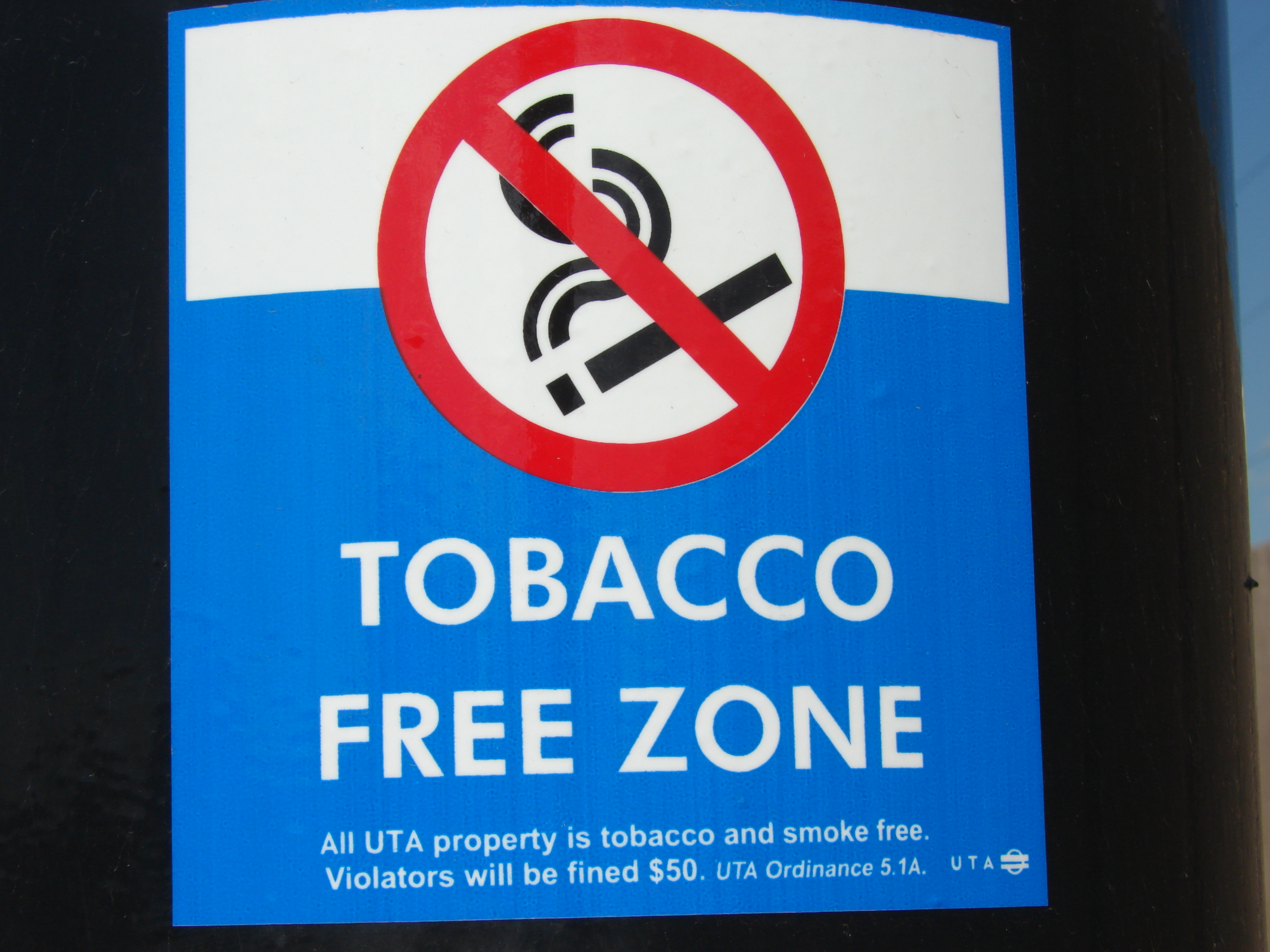
Sign informing patrons of Utah Transit Authority's tobacco-free policy

- Statewide smoking ban: Effective January 1, 2007, as passed in March 2006 (amended in 2012), Utah's 1995 Indoor Clean Air Act was expanded to ban smoking statewide in all enclosed workplaces in Utah, including bars and restaurants (bars and private clubs were exempt until January 1, 2009), exempting only (1) designated hotel/motel smoking rooms, (2) areas of owner-operated businesses with no employees besides the owner, and (3) American Indian religious and cultural ceremonies. Since the state law supersedes any ordinances passed by political subdivisions of the state (i.e., cities, counties, school districts, agencies, etc.), such political subdivisions are preempted from regulating indoor smoking any more or less stringently than the Act. Utah is one of the few states with a statewide smoking ban that does not exempt tobacconists.
  - Local outdoor smoking bans: Notwithstanding the preemption against political subdivisions modifying the restrictions on indoor smoking, the Act expressly allows such political subdivisions to regulate "smoking in outdoor places of public access which are owned or operated by" (emphasis added) a political subdivision (specifically including state institutions of public or higher education). Accordingly, some political subdivisions have enacted local ordinances prohibiting smoking in certain outdoor areas such as schools, parks, and public transit facilities.

=== Vermont ===
- Statewide smoking ban: Effective September 1, 2005, smoking is banned in all enclosed workplaces in Vermont, including all bars and restaurants, except in private residences (unless if it is being used as a childcare facility or it smoking is banned under the landlord's request) as well as areas of owner-operated businesses with no employees that are not open to the public, although separately ventilated designated smoking areas in businesses where employees are not required to be were exempt until July 1, 2009. Designated unenclosed smoking areas in businesses where the layout of the workplace is such that smoking would not be a physical irritation to any nonsmoking employee and three-fourths of the employees agreed were also exempt until July 1, 2009. The Vermont Veterans Home in Bennington is the only non-owner-operated workplace in the state permitted to allow smoking. Vermont is one of the few states with a statewide smoking ban that does not expressly exempt tobacconists, and is one of four states that does not allow the designation of hotel/motel smoking rooms. Local governments may regulate smoking more stringently than the state law.

=== Virginia ===
- No statewide smoking ban. Instead, Virginia's 2009 statewide smoking law, the 2009 Indoor Clean Air Act prohibits smoking statewide in enclosed public elevators, public school buses, primary and secondary schools, hospital emergency rooms, health department offices, polling places, indoor service lines and cashier lines, public restrooms in government buildings and hospitals, child daycare centers except where located in a private home, and public restrooms of health care facilities, and relegating smoking in restaurants (including bars) to separately ventilated designated smoking rooms that are structurally separated from the rest of the establishment. The Act exempts private clubs, retail tobacco stores, tobacco warehouses, tobacco manufacturing facilities, prisons, designated smoking areas in government offices, food preparation facilities for catering services, restaurants located on the premises of tobacco manufacturers, rented private rooms in restaurants; requires the reasonable designation of non-smoking areas in educational facilities where smoking is not banned, hospitals, retail stores bigger than 15,000 square feet (1,400 m^{2}), and recreational facilities.

Local governments are preempted from regulating smoking more stringently than the Act. Since 2006, smoking in state offices, vehicles, and buildings (except for correctional facilities) has been banned by executive order issued by the Governor of Virginia. A law which came into effect on July 1, 2016, banned smoking in private cars with any occupants who are 8 years or younger.

=== Washington ===
- Statewide smoking ban: On December 8, 2005, after ratification by a majority of Washington voters in a statewide initiative referendum, an amendment to Washington's 1985 Clean Indoor Air Act became effective banning smoking statewide in all public places and places of employment in Washington (except 25% of hotel/motel rooms), as well as within 25 feet (7.6 m) of doors, windows, or ventilation intakes to such places. The act exempts private enclosed workplaces and private residences except when being used to provide licensed childcare, foster care, adult care, or other similar social service care. Washington does not provide exemptions for tobacconists or businesses whose sole purpose is to provide an environment for smoking (e.g. hookah lounges, cigar bars). However, private clubs in enclosed spaces with no employees, and businesses on tribal lands, are exempt. Local governments may regulate smoking more stringently than the act, and local health boards are authorized to enforce the act locally.

=== West Virginia ===
- No statewide smoking ban. Instead, West Virginia's statewide smoking laws generally prohibit smoking in (1) public transportation vehicles where a "no smoking" sign is posted, (2) areas of public school except teacher's lounges not accessible to students (unless a local education board rules differently), (3) workplaces where a "no smoking" sign is posted, (4) areas near surface magazines for explosives used in mining, (5) mines and structures around mines, (6) nonsmoking sections in bingo halls, and (7) nonsmoking areas in nursing homes. No West Virginia law requires the designation of nonsmoking areas generally in enclosed workplaces. In 2003, the Supreme Court of Appeals of West Virginia ruled that county health boards may regulate smoking more stringently than the state, except in bingo halls and retirement homes. As of April 2009, 51 of the 55 counties and two cities in West Virginia have enacted local smoking bans to varying degrees.
- Localities in West Virginia with a smoking ban that includes all bars and restaurants (37 total):
  - Barbour County, October 1, 2014, banned in all enclosed workplaces, including bars and restaurants
  - Berkeley County, July 1, 2014, banned in all enclosed workplaces, including bars and restaurants
  - Braxton County, July 1, 2004, banned in all enclosed workplaces, including bars and restaurants
  - Brooke County, July 1, 2015, banned in all enclosed workplaces, including bars and restaurants
  - Cabell County, October 1, 2008, banned in all enclosed workplaces including bars and restaurants
  - Calhoun County, October 1, 2008, banned in all enclosed workplaces, including bars and restaurants
  - Doddridge County, September 29, 2009, banned in all enclosed workplaces, including bars and restaurants
  - Grant County, September 1, 2009, banned in all enclosed workplaces, including bars and restaurants
  - Greenbrier County, September 1, 2012, banned in all enclosed workplaces, including bars and restaurants
  - Hampshire County, January 1, 2016, banned in all enclosed workplaces, including bars and restaurants
  - Hancock County, July 1, 2015, banned in all enclosed workplaces, including bars and restaurants
  - Harrison County, January 1, 2009, banned in all enclosed workplaces, including bars and restaurants
  - Jackson County, July 1, 2008, banned in all enclosed workplaces, including bars and restaurants
  - Kanawha County, July 1, 2008, banned in all enclosed workplaces, including bars and restaurants
  - Lewis County, July 1, 2013, banned in all enclosed workplaces, including bars and restaurants
  - Lincoln County, September 29, 2002, banned in all enclosed workplaces, including bars and restaurants
  - Marlinton, November 8, 2006, banned in all enclosed workplaces, including bars and restaurants
  - Mason County, July 1, 2016, banned in all enclosed workplaces, including bars and restaurants
  - Mineral County, January 2, 2014, banned in all enclosed workplaces including bars and restaurants
  - Monongalia County, March 9, 2012, banned in all enclosed workplaces, including bars and restaurants
  - Monroe County, January 1, 2015, banned in all enclosed workplaces, including bars and restaurants
  - Morgantown, January 1, 2012, banned in all enclosed workplaces, including bars and restaurants
  - Nicholas County, August 15, 2014, banned in all enclosed workplaces, including bars and restaurants
  - Ohio County, June 26, 2005, banned in all enclosed workplaces, including bars and restaurants
  - Pendleton County, January 1, 2012, banned in all enclosed workplaces, including bars and restaurants
  - Pleasants County, October 1, 2008, banned in all enclosed workplaces, including bars and restaurants
  - Pocahontas County, August 1, 2007, banned in all enclosed workplaces, including bars and restaurants
  - Preston County, April 1, 2016, banned in all enclosed workplaces, including bars and restaurants
  - Randolph County, September 30, 2007, banned in all enclosed workplaces, including bars and restaurants
  - Ritchie County, October 1, 2008, banned in all enclosed workplaces, including bars and restaurants
  - Roane County, October 1, 2008, banned in all enclosed workplaces, including bars and restaurants
  - Summers County, January 1, 2008, banned in all enclosed workplaces, including bars and restaurants
  - Taylor County, July 22, 2012, banned in all enclosed workplaces, including bars and restaurants
  - Tucker County, May 30, 2003, banned in all enclosed workplaces, including bars and restaurants
  - Upshur County, September 9, 2007, banned in all enclosed workplaces, including bars and restaurants
  - Wirt County, October 1, 2008, banned in all enclosed workplaces, including bars and restaurants
  - Wood County, October 1, 2008, banned in all enclosed workplaces, including bars and restaurants
- Localities in West Virginia with a smoking ban that does not include all bars and restaurants (15 total):
  - Boone County, August 31, 2005, banned in all enclosed workplaces except bars and restaurants
  - Clay County, June 17, 2005, banned in all enclosed workplaces, including restaurants but exempting bars
  - Fayette County, May 31, 2005, banned in all enclosed workplaces, including restaurants but exempting bars
  - Hardy County, April 1, 2000, banned in all enclosed workplaces except bars and restaurants
  - Jefferson County, October 31, 2003, banned in all enclosed workplaces except bars and restaurants
  - Marion County, July 30, 2004, banned in all enclosed workplaces, including restaurants but exempting bars
  - Marshall County, April 1, 2013, banned in all enclosed workplaces except bars and restaurants
  - McDowell County, July 1, 2006, banned in all restaurants, but not bars or all other workplaces
  - Mercer County, December 30, 2005, banned in all enclosed workplaces, including restaurants but exempting bars
  - Mingo County, July 1, 2006, banned in all enclosed workplaces except bars and restaurants
  - Morgan County, July 30, 2007, banned in all enclosed workplaces, including restaurants but exempting bars
  - Raleigh County, February 22, 2005, banned in all enclosed workplaces except bars and restaurants
  - Wayne County, December 9, 2004, banned in all enclosed workplaces except bars and restaurants
  - Webster County, October 13, 2004, banned in all enclosed workplaces, including restaurants but exempting bars
  - Wyoming County, January 31, 1998, banned in all enclosed workplaces except bars and restaurants

=== Wisconsin ===
- Statewide smoking ban: On July 5, 2010, after being signed into law by Governor Jim Doyle on May 18, 2009, S.B. 181 (2009 Wisconsin Act 12) took effect, banning smoking statewide in all enclosed workplaces in Wisconsin, including bars, restaurants, lodging establishments, and private clubs, as well as outdoors within a "reasonable distance" of any such place, except in bar/restaurant patios. The Act exempts cigar bars or retail tobacco stores already in existence, private homes, and rooms in nursing homes where occupants agree to allow smoking. It also exempts bars and restaurants consisting of two or more walls with openings that allow air in from the outside and cover at least 25% of each wall's surface area. It does not include casinos run by American Indian tribes, as those casinos are in the tribes' sovereign territory. Local governments may not regulate smoking more strictly than the Act. Prior to this law taking effect, several localities in Wisconsin had local smoking bans in effect.

=== Wyoming ===
- No statewide smoking ban. Instead, Wyoming state law only prohibits smoking where it could cause an explosion and in underground mines. Wyoming has no state laws concerning indoor smoking in general, and thus local governments can regulate general indoor smoking as they see fit. As of July 2017, seven cities in Wyoming have enacted local smoking bans, all covering restaurants, but varying otherwise.
- Localities in Wyoming with a smoking ban that includes all bars and restaurants (6 total):
  - Burlington, October 9, 2008, banned in all enclosed workplaces, including bars and restaurants
  - Casper, November 4, 2015, banned in bars and restaurants, but not other workplaces
  - Cheyenne, August 15, 2006, banned in all bars and restaurants, but not in all other workplaces; ban includes private clubs
  - Evanston, September 4, 2007, banned in all bars and restaurants, but not in all other workplaces
  - Laramie, April 6, 2005, banned in all bars and restaurants, but not in all other workplaces; ban includes private clubs
  - Mountain View, June 1, 2011, banned in all enclosed workplaces, including bars and restaurants
- Localities in Wyoming with a smoking ban that does not include all bars and restaurants (1 total):
  - Rock Springs, March 1, 2008, banned in all restaurants, but not bars, private clubs, and other workplaces

== See also ==
- Alcohol laws of the United States by state
- Electronic cigarette
- List of smoke-free colleges and universities
- List of smoking bans worldwide
- List of vaping bans in the United States
- Smokeasy
- Smoking ban
- Smoking in the United States
- Tobacco control
