= History of cardiopulmonary resuscitation =

The history of cardiopulmonary resuscitation (CPR) can be traced as far back as the literary works of ancient Egypt (c. 2686 – c. 2181 BC). However, it was not until the 18th century that credible reports of cardiopulmonary resuscitation began to appear in the medical literature.

Mouth-to-mouth ventilation has been used for centuries as an element of CPR, but it fell out of favor in the late 19th century with the widespread adoption of manual resuscitative techniques such as the Marshall Hall method, Silvester's method, the Schafer method and the Holger Nielsen technique. The technique of mouth-to-mouth ventilation would not come back into favor until the late 1950s, after its "accidental rediscovery" by James Elam.

The modern elements of resuscitation for sudden cardiac arrest include CPR (consisting of ventilation of the lungs and chest compressions), defibrillation and emergency medical services (the means to bring these techniques to the patient quickly).

== Renaissance ==
Burhan-ud-din Kermani, a physician in 15th century Persia, described his approach to the treatment of ghashy (cardiac and respiratory insufficiency), which involved moving the victim's arms and expanding and compressing the left side of the chest.

In 1667, Robert Hooke performed an experiment that refuted Galen's hypothesis that death would ensue if the lungs ceased to expand and contract. His test subject was a dog in which he made cuts in the chest wall, diaphragm, and pericardium. He determined that "the motion of the lungs without fresh air" contributed nothing to the life of the animal, but rather it was the continuous supply of fresh air that was necessary to preserve life.

== 18th century ==
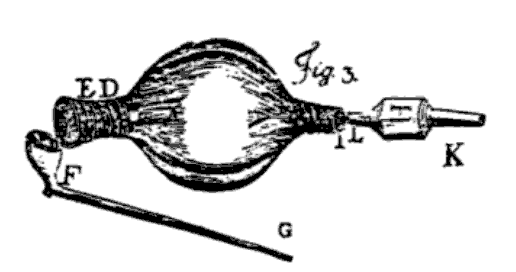
A device for the administration of a tobacco smoke enema, consisting of a smoking pipe attached to a pig's bladder, with a cone for insertion into the rectum

=== Artificial ventilation ===
Significant advances in resuscitation were made in Europe during the Age of Enlightenment. For example, in 1732, Scottish surgeon William A. Tossach used mouth-to-mouth resuscitation to resuscitate James Blair, a coal miner in Alloa, Scotland who had been apparently dead for 30 to 45 minutes. The patient recovered and returned to work a few days later. This case – which was witnessed by a crowd of nearly 400 people – is considered to be the first modern documented account of successful CPR in an adult. Tossach published an account of this case in 1744. English physician John Fothergill (1712–1780) discussed Tossach’s experience in a paper he published the following year.

The first organized effort to respond to sudden death was in 1767, when a group of citizens in Amsterdam formed the Society for the Recovery of Drowned Persons (SRDP). The SRDP recommended a range of resuscitation techniques, including mouth-to-mouth ventilation, warming the victim, removing water from the lungs by positioning the victim's head at a lower position than the feet and applying manual pressure to the abdomen, stimulating the victim by means such as rectal fumigation with tobacco smoke, and bloodletting. Within four years of its founding, the SRDP claimed to have saved over 150 patients by using these methods. By 1773, similar organizations had been formed in Hamburg, Venice, Milan, Padua, Vienna, and Paris. In Hamburg, an ordinance was passed in 1769 which allowed notices to be read in churches describing how to use these methods to rescue people who were drowned, strangled, frozen, or overcome by noxious gases.

English physician Thomas Cogan (1736–1818) was living and practicing in the Dutch Republic at that time, having just earned his medical degree from Leiden University in 1767. Impressed by the accomplishments of these organizations, he returned to London where in 1774 he and a group of prominent citizens (including William Hawes and Frederick Bull) founded the Society for the Recovery of Persons Apparently Drowned (which later became the Royal Humane Society). Following the successes of these organizations, similar organizations soon sprang up in many large cities in Europe and the United States, all with the goal of successfully resuscitating victims of sudden death or cardiac arrest. These rescue societies of the 18th century were the precursors of today's emergency medical services.

=== Defibrillation ===
In 1775, Danish physician Peter Christian Abildgaard conducted experiments on electrical shock on animals. He found that applying an electric shock to the head of a hen rendered it apparently lifeless, but that it could be revived by applying another shock to the chest. He repeated this experiment several times on the same test subject, successfully resuscitating it each time. The hen even laid an egg a couple of days later.

In 1792, English physician James Curry (1763–1819) noted that the important difference between absolute death and apparent death was that in the former, "the vital principle is completely extinguished", while in the latter "it only lies dormant, and may again be roused into action, and the person thereby completely restored to life and health". Curry performed experimental work on external defibrillation in small animals, and even described two successful cases of human resuscitation by this means. He used two electrodes – one above the right clavicle and the other over the lower left chest.

== 19th century ==
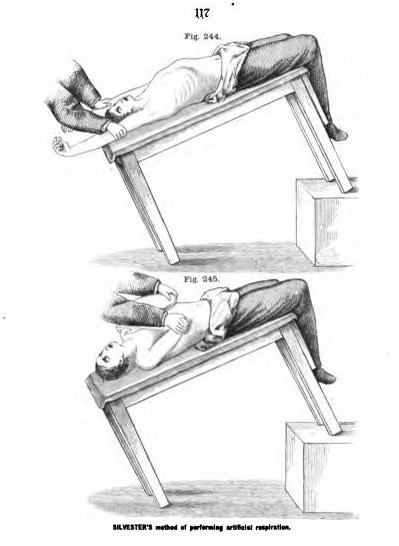
Illustration of Silvester's method of performing artificial respiration. From The surgeon's handbook on the treatment of wounded in war, by Friedrich von Esmarch, 1878.

=== Artificial ventilation ===
In 1856, English physician Marshall Hall (1790–1857) described a new method of providing artificial ventilation of the lungs, which involved rolling the victim from the prone (inspiratory) to the lateral (expiratory) position at a rate of sixteen times per minute. Henry Robert Silvester (1828–1908) soon noted several important shortcomings inherent in Hall's technique. Chief among these were 1) that the resulting inspiratory and expiratory volumes were quite small, 2) that repeatedly rolling a lifeless body from prone to lateral was likely to cause significant injury to the cervical spine and face, and finally 3) that the risk of pulmonary aspiration of gastric contents was unacceptably high using Hall's method.

In 1858, Silvester proposed a new method of artificial ventilation in which the victim is laid in the supine position, and their arms are raised above their head to aid inhalation and then pressed against their chest to aid exhalation, with this sequence repeated several times per minute. Silvester's method received a great deal of attention, and was advocated by many prominent physicians of that era, including Friedrich von Esmarch.

=== Chest compressions ===
In 1868, John D. Hill of the Royal Free Hospital described the use of sternal compression at a rate of twelve times a minute to successfully resuscitate three patients who had no carotid pulse and no audible heart sounds. In these three cases, the chest compressions appear to have served primarily as a means for the inhalation of ammonia from a sponge held close to the nostrils of the patient.

In 1877, Rudolph Boehm at the University of Dorpat reported the use of external cardiac massage to resuscitate cats after chloroform-induced cardiac arrest.

In 1892, Friedrich Maass – a surgical resident at the University of Göttingen – was the first to describe the successful resuscitation of a patient using external cardiac massage. Maass became the first proponent of external chest compression as an effective means of assisting circulation, rather than ventilation alone.

== 20th century ==
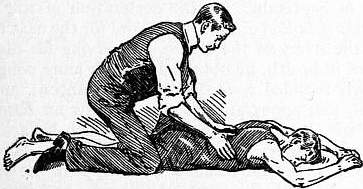
Illustration of the Schäfer method of resuscitation, from Encyclopædia Britannica, 1911

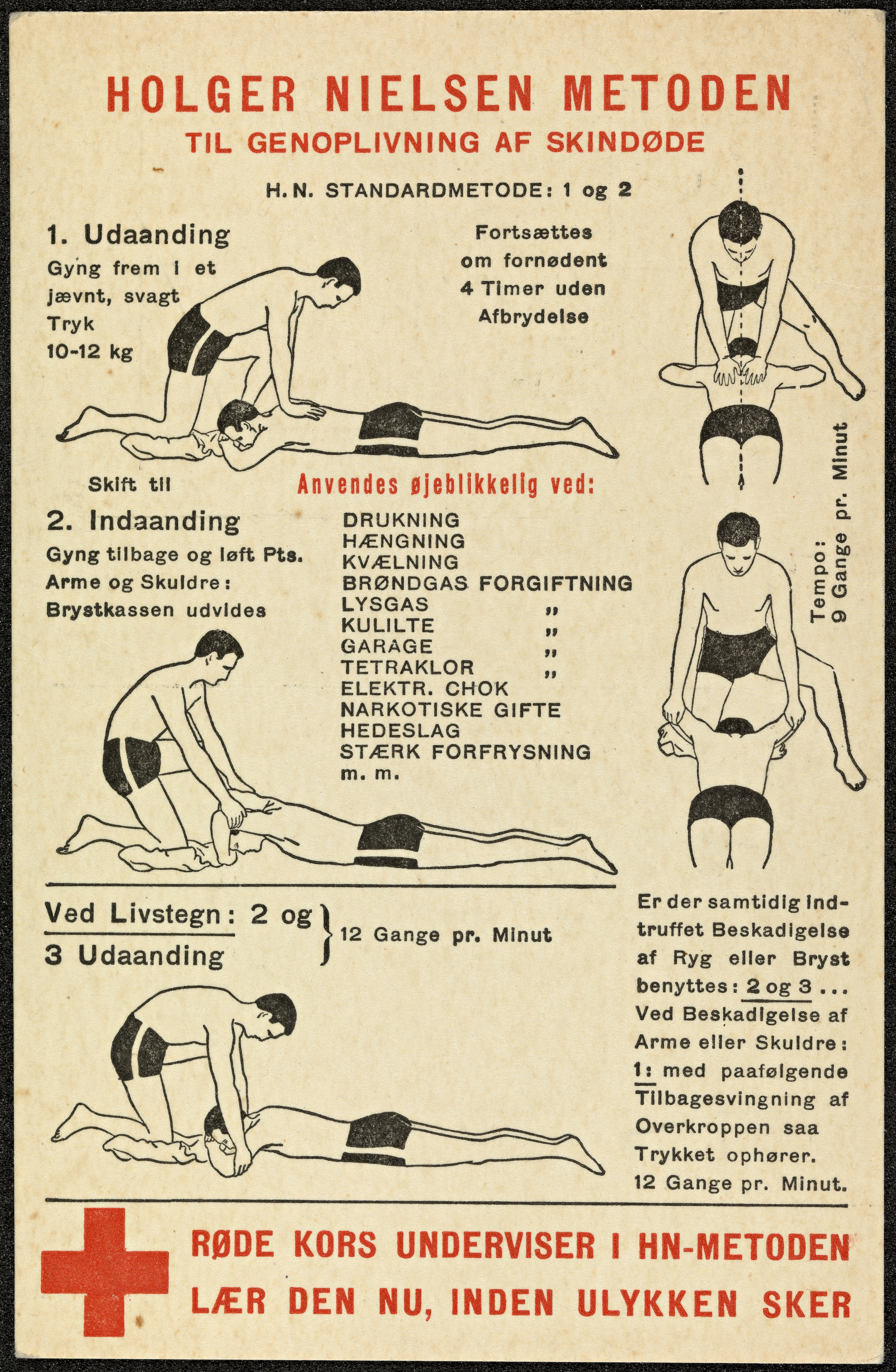
Illustration of the Holger Nielsen method of resuscitation. Denmark, c. 1955

=== Artificial ventilation ===
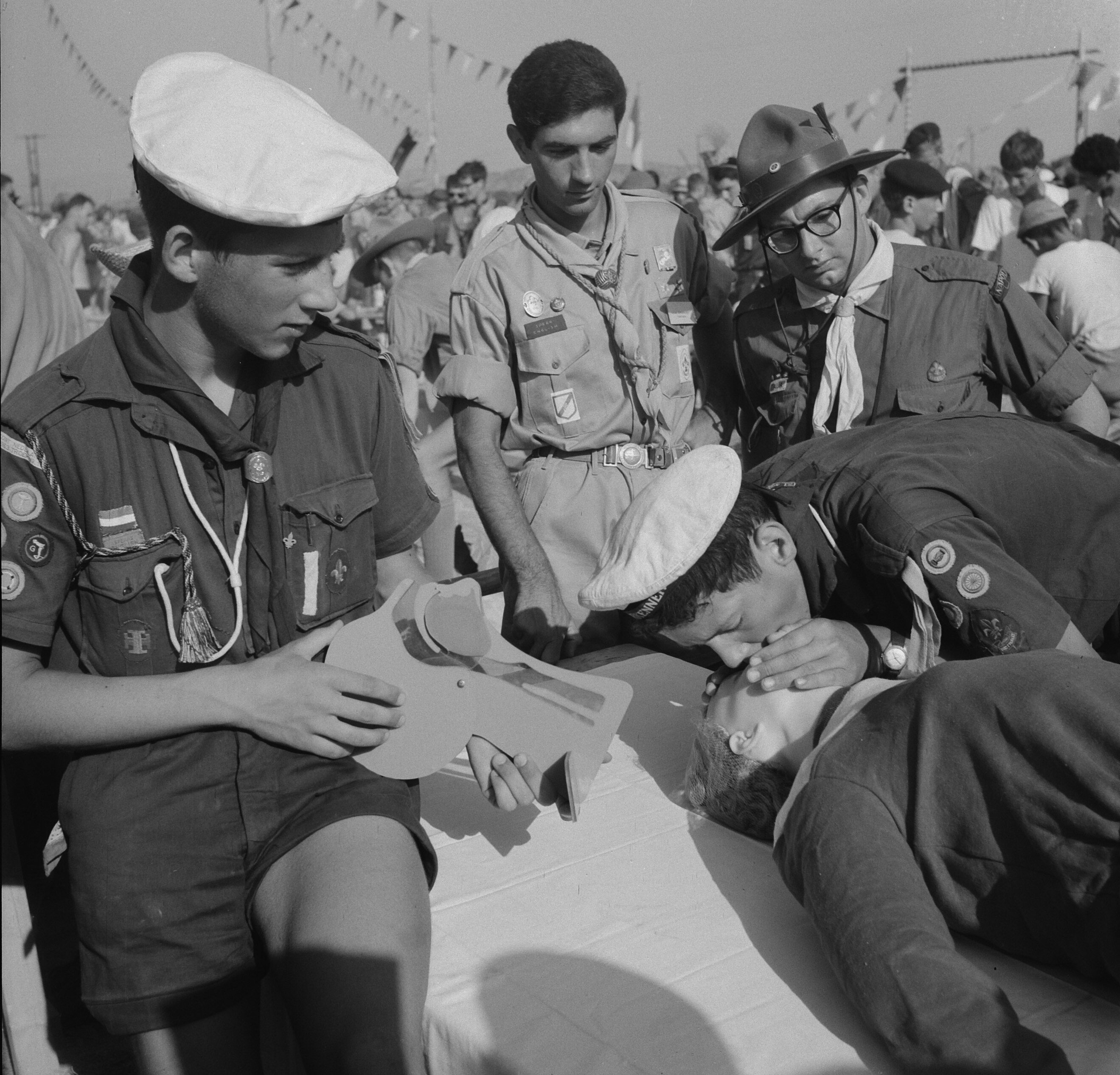
Demonstration of mouth-to-mouth ventilation by Dutch Boy Scouts at the 11th World Scout Jamboree, 1963

Although the use of mouth-to-mouth ventilation as a resuscitative technique dates back virtually to the beginning of recorded history, it seems to have fallen out of favor in the late 19th century with the widespread adoption of Silvester's method (the chest-pressure and arm-lift technique). Silvester's method remained the most widespread method of resuscitation from its description in 1858 until the first decade of the 20th century, when some other innovative approaches to the problem of sudden death gained some recognition. For example, certain jujutsu techniques (referred to as kuatsu) were being used with some degree of success in Japan at that time.

The Shafer method became popular after it was described by Edward Albert Sharpey-Schafer (1850–1935) in 1904. That in turn was replaced by the Holger Nielsen technique, first described in 1932 by Danish triple Olympic medallist Holger Nielsen (1866–1955). The Shafer method and the Holger Nielsen technique were both manual methods, similar to Silvester's method except that the victim was laid in the prone instead of the supine position.

The mostly forgotten technique of mouth-to-mouth ventilation finally came back into favor in the mid-20th century, beginning with its "accidental rediscovery" by James Elam (1918–1995). In 1946, during a poliomyelitis epidemic in Minnesota, Elam – an anesthesiologist – resorted to mouth-to-mouth ventilation on many occasions to successfully rescue paralyzed patients when their mechanical ventilators failed. Based on this experience, Elam and his team performed a series of experiments in the early 1950s using pharmacologically paralyzed human volunteers to demonstrate that this technique could effectively maintain adequate levels of oxygen and carbon dioxide in the blood.

In 1956, Elam met Peter Safar (1924–2003) – also an anesthesiologist – and persuaded him to join the effort to convince the world that ventilating the lungs with expired air was effective as part of a resuscitative technique. Safar performed further experiments on human volunteers, comparing Silvester's method with the Holger Nielsen method and the mouth-to-mouth method of artificial ventilation. By 1957, the experiments of Elam and Safar had conclusively demonstrated that the mouth-to-mouth method was superior to these older methods of artificial ventilation.

An ad hoc panel comprising many eminent authorities on methods of artificial respiration was convened on March 8, 1957. After carefully considering the evidence available at that time, the opinion of the panel was unanimous that – for infants and small children – the mouth-to-mouth method was preferable to the rocking method, back-pressure arm-lift, and other manual methods. Based on this recommendation, the mouth-to-mouth ventilation technique was endorsed that year by the National Research Council, United States Armed Forces, and the American Red Cross. The American Medical Association followed suit in 1958. That year, Elam served as a medical adviser on the instructional film Rescue Breathing, which demonstrated and publicized this new life-saving technique.

In 1959, Elam (together with Danish anaesthetist Henning Ruben, the co-inventor of the Ambu bag) wrote an instructional booklet entitled Rescue Breathing, which was distributed throughout the United States. Organizations such as the American Red Cross began to provide training at local chapters in the proper administration of artificial respiration. The familiar "Resusci Anne" training mannequin was introduced in Norway and the United States in 1961. Designed by Norwegian doll maker Asmund S. Laerdal, "Resusci Anne" featured a lifelike face that was based on the death mask of a French girl who drowned in the Seine River in the late 1880s.

=== Chest compressions ===
While the cessation of respiration is an obvious sign of sudden death, the cessation of circulation – and particularly the rhythm of the heart – is not as easy to detect. For this reason, the appreciation of artificial circulation as a key factor in resuscitation lagged considerably behind the obvious need for artificial respiration. Although closed chest massage had been described in 1892 by Friedrich Maass, its benefit was not widely recognized until the 1960s.

In 1958, a team of researchers at Johns Hopkins University (who were unaware of Maass' experience and publication) made an accidental discovery while studying cardiac defibrillation in dogs. The team – which included William Kouwenhoven, Guy Knickerbocker, and James Jude – noticed that by forcefully applying the paddles to the chest of the canine test subject, they could achieve a pulse in the femoral artery. Further experimentation on dogs addressed such questions as the ideal location, rate, and force of chest compressions. Armed with this information, the group began human trials.

The first person successfully resuscitated using this technique was recalled by Jude: "She was rather an obese female who … went into cardiac arrest as a result of flurothane [sic] anesthetic. This woman had no blood pressure, no pulse, and ordinarily, we would have opened up her chest. Instead, since we weren’t in the operating room, we applied external cardiac massage. Her blood pressure and pulse came back at once. We didn’t have to open her chest. They went ahead and did the operation on her, and she recovered completely."

In a 1960 landmark article in The Journal of the American Medical Association, the Johns Hopkins team reported their findings on 20 cases of in-hospital cardiac arrest. Many of these patients had experienced cardiac arrest as a result of general anesthesia, and three patients were documented to be in ventricular fibrillation. The duration of chest compressions varied from less than 1 minute to 65 minutes. Fourteen of the 20 patients (70%) survived and were discharged from the hospital. The authors concluded that chest compression can be useful as a bridge therapy until an external defibrillator can be brought to the scene.

=== The combined use of ventilation and chest compressions ===
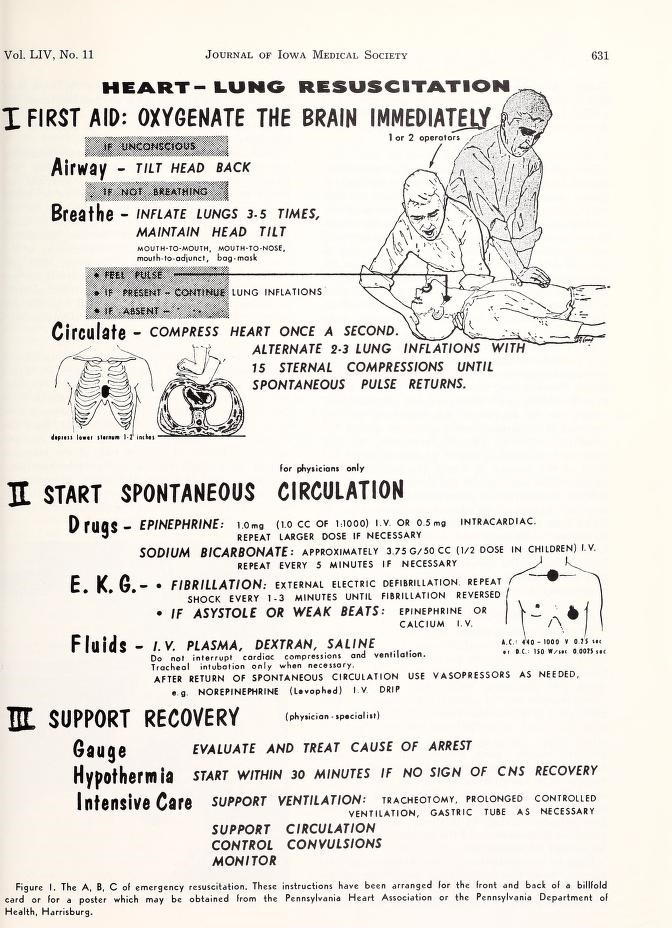
1964 illustration of the ABCs of CPR. Note that even at that time, therapeutic hypothermia was recommended within 30 minutes for victims that show signs of cerebral hypoxia.

CPR as it is practiced today (the combination of ventilation with chest compressions) made its debut in September 1960, when the two teams of researchers (Kouwenhoven/Jude/Knickerbocker, and Safar/Elam/Escarraga) presented their findings at the annual meeting of the Maryland Medical Society in Ocean City, Maryland. They presented convincing data to show that chest compression alone did not provide effective ventilation; it was necessary to include mouth-to-mouth ventilation.

The use of mouth-to-mouth ventilation (rescue breathing) had been taught to laypeople as early as 1958, but many physicians felt that closed-chest cardiac resuscitation (chest compressions) should only be taught to physicians, dentists, nurses and emergency rescue squads. In 1962, CPR was formally endorsed by the American Heart Association, American Red Cross, and the Industrial Medical Association, but with the caveat that it should be applied only by carefully trained personnel, and training should not at that time be extended to the general public. In 1965, these organizations issued a revised statement reaffirming this view.

The Kouwenhoven/Jude/Knickerbocker team however believed that not only rescue breathing but also closed-chest cardiac resuscitation could and should be taught to laypeople. They produced an 11-minute training film called Life in Your Hands in 1961, in which they demonstrated the new technique of CPR in various settings and stressed the importance of "Air and Circulation". The following year, Archer Gordon and David Adams produced a 26-minute training film called The Pulse of Life. For the film, Gordon and Adams devised the easy-to-remember mnemonic of A, B & C, which represented the sequence of steps in CPR: Airway, Breathing, and Circulation. These films were used in CPR classes and viewed by millions of students, many of whom were laypeople.

By 1964, Safar had expanded the "A-B-C" mnemonic to include:

- Phase I
  - A—Airway (open the airway)
  - B—Breathing (provide rescue breathing)
  - C—Circulation (administer chest compressions)
- Phase II
  - D—Drugs (administer epinephrine, sodium bicarbonate, calcium chloride, and/or norepinephrine as necessary)
  - E—EKG (administer external defibrillation if necessary)
  - F—Fluids (administer intravenous fluids as necessary)
- Phase III
  - G—Gauge (evaluate and treat the underlying cause of the cardiac arrest)
  - H—Hypothermia (begin therapeutic hypothermia within 30 minutes for victims that show signs of cerebral hypoxia)
  - I—Intensive Care Unit (administer chest compressions)

By 1966, CPR was being taught to laypeople as well as professionals, but with disappointing results. Fewer than 50% of people were able to pass a CPR performance evaluation three months after receiving standardized training in CPR, and the results of cardiac resuscitation attempts initiated outside of hospitals were dismal. In response to requests from the American Red Cross for the establishment of better training methods for CPR, the National Research Council of the National Academy of Sciences convened another ad hoc conference on CPR in 1966. Over 30 national organizations were represented at this conference. The 1966 conference resulted in the formulation of the first national guidelines for the implementation of CPR. Safar's mnemonic was trimmed back to "A-B-C-D", with "D" representing "Definitive therapy". Other recommendations that emerged from this conference encouraged practice with training mannequins, but continued to discourage the teaching of CPR to laypeople. Of interest, both Silvester's and Holger Nielsen's methods were still recommended as alternatives to mouth-to-mouth ventilation.

=== Defibrillation ===
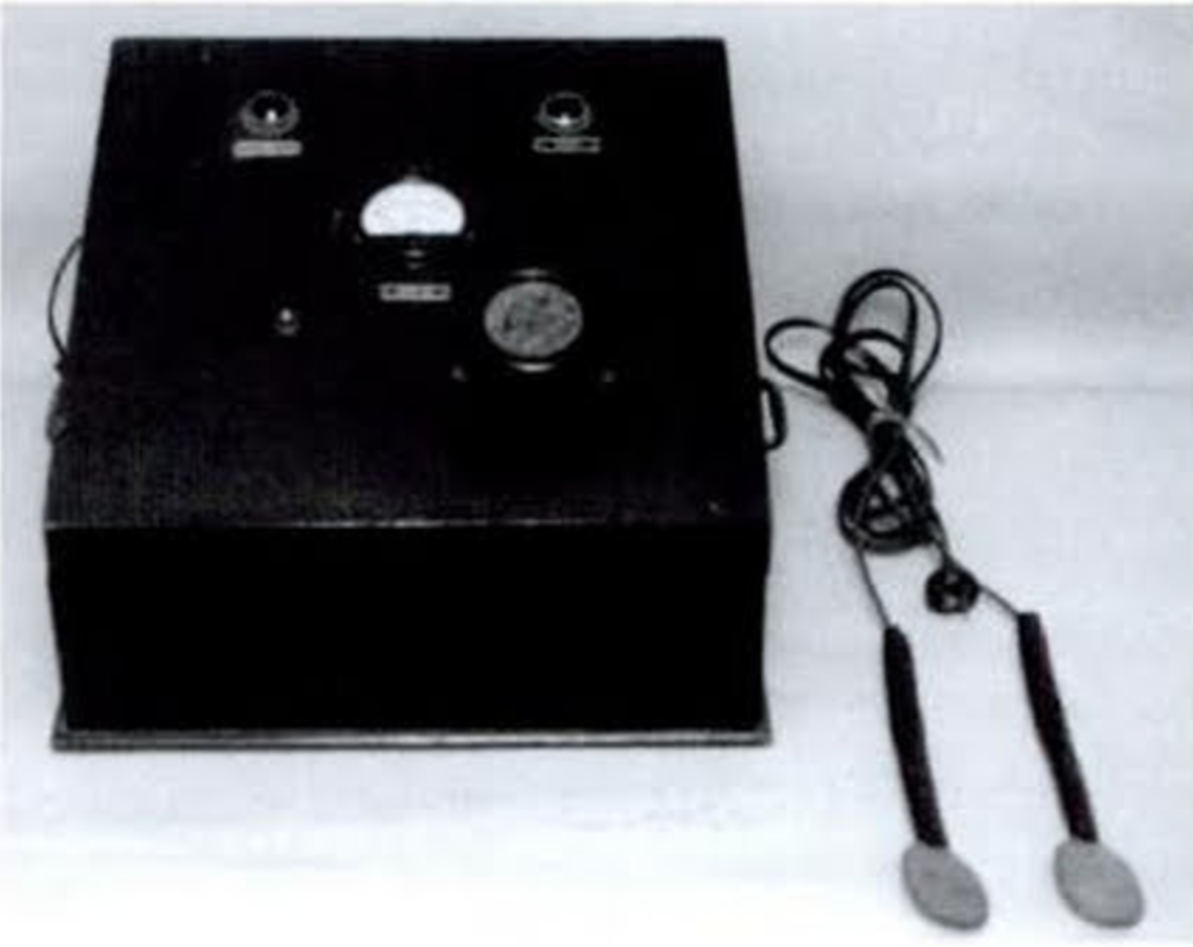
Defibrillator used by Claude Beck in 1947

As early as the 1930s, it was known that small electric shocks could induce fibrillation in the ventricles of the heart, and that more powerful shocks could reverse this fibrillation. In 1947, Claude Beck (1894–1971) reported the first successful internal defibrillation of the human heart. To accomplish this, the chest had to be surgically opened and the defibrillator paddles placed directly on the heart.

Beck's groundbreaking work was eclipsed in 1955, with the development by Paul Zoll (1911–1999) of the external defibrillator – a device that could externally defibrillate the heart through the closed chest. Zoll published a report of his experience in The New England Journal of Medicine in 1956, in which his external defibrillator was employed to successfully stop ventricular fibrillation eleven times in four different patients. Since direct current batteries and capacitor technology both powerful enough to do the job and portable enough for practical use did not exist at that time, the earliest external defibrillators utilized alternating current and were run from line voltage. These AC defibrillators were very large and heavy, primarily because they contained a transformer to step up the line voltage from 110 volts to 500 or 1000 volts. They were mounted on wheels and pushed down the hallway from one part of the hospital to another.

The portability problem was solved by Bernard Lown (1921–2021). Lown devised a defibrillator that utilized direct current instead of alternating current. A capacitor stored the energy until it was released in one massive jolt to the chest wall. The availability of new, small capacitors considerably reduced the size and weight of external defibrillators, which could now be easily brought to victims in a wide range of environments. By 1963, hospitals were beginning to design mobile resuscitation carts equipped with these portable external defibrillators.

The idea for an automated external defibrillator was first advanced in the 1970s by Archibald Diack (1907–1993), a surgeon in Portland, Oregon. Diack and his team developed a portable unit that could diagnose an abnormal heart rhythm and deliver either a defibrillatory current or a pacing pulse, as indicated by the internal logic circuit. The device was produced by the Cardiac Resuscitator Corporation and marketed as the "Heart-Aid". It was designed for temporary use by laypeople in emergency situations before professional care could be administered. The Heart-Aid utilized a plastic airway with an embedded electrode. An electrical current was transmitted from the capacitor, through the plastic airway device, to an electrode placed over the sternum. There was also a breath detector, which was a safeguard to prevent shocking people who were breathing. It included printed instructions and diagrams for the rescuer to properly apply the electrodes, as well as a speech synthesis chip to give verbal instructions to the rescuer. By the late 1980s, the small company had been purchased by Emerson Radio Corporation, and other manufacturers soon entered the field. Current models use electrode pads attached to the chest.

== Recent developments in CPR ==
In 1965, Frank Pantridge turned his attention to this vexing problem of heart attacks and sudden cardiac death. He believed the problem of death from acute myocardial infarction had to be solved outside the hospital, not in the emergency room or the coronary care unit. Pantridge's solution was to develop the world's first mobile coronary care unit, or MCCU. He staffed it with an ambulance driver, a physician, and a nurse.

The team reported the initial results of their program in the August 5, 1967 issue of The Lancet; their findings on 312 patients covered a 15-month period. Half the patients had myocardial infarction and there were no deaths during transportation. Of ground-breaking importance was the information on 10 patients who had cardiac arrest. All had ventricular fibrillation; six arrests occurred after the arrival of the MCCU, and four occurred shortly before arrival of the ambulance. All 10 patients were resuscitated and admitted to the hospital. Five were subsequently discharged alive. The article has historical importance because it served to stimulate pre-hospital emergency cardiac care programs throughout the world.

By the early 1970s CPR, defibrillation, and a rapid means to provide prehospital care were all in place. The structure to resuscitate sudden death victims had been built and was proving successful. That most of the world did not have this structure in place in the 1970s was largely due to lack of diffusion and spread of the ideas, rather than the impossibility of carrying them out. However, the story of resuscitation does not stop in the early 1970s. Major advances have continued. In 1980 the first program to train EMTs to perform defibrillation began in King County, Washington, and similar programs spread throughout the United States. This training required 10 hours, and in the first demonstration project, survival from ventricular fibrillation increased from 7% to 26%. In 1984 the first program with fire fighter EMTs using automated external defibrillators (AEDs) also began in King County, Washington. The use of AEDs simplified the training of EMTs and thus allowed the procedure to spread more rapidly throughout communities. Automated external defibrillators require considerably less training time compared to manual defibrillators since the EMT does not have to interpret the cardiac rhythm.

In 1981 a program to provide telephone instructions in CPR began in King County, Washington. This program used the emergency dispatchers to give instant directions while the fire department EMT personnel were in route to the scene. This demonstration project increased the rate of bystander-provided CPR by 50%. Dispatcher-assisted CPR is now standard care for dispatcher centers throughout the United States and in other countries such as Israel, Great Britain, Sweden, and Norway.

The American Heart Association uses a metaphor of four links in a chain to describe the elements of successful resuscitation. These links are early access (recognizing cardiac arrest and calling 911), early CPR, early defibrillation, and early advanced care (such as medications, endotracheal intubation) The early paramedic programs were all designed to provide CPR, defibrillation, and advanced care quickly enough to resuscitate patients in cardiac arrest.

Further advanced technologies to supplement CPR are being tested. These include the use of drones to deliver defibrillators to patients undergoing CPR outside hospital, as well as placing patients in whom CPR is ongoing but cardiac rhythm cannot be restored onto heart-lung bypass (ECMO) machines. This then allows them to be transported to specialist centres where the cause of their cardiac arrest (a blocked coronary artery for example) can be addressed. So called 'ECMO-CPR' may yet further revolutionize the way in which CPR is delivered. Trials of pre-hospital ECMO-CPR in France and Australia have been promising.
