= Harvey mannequin =

Medical simulator

Harvey
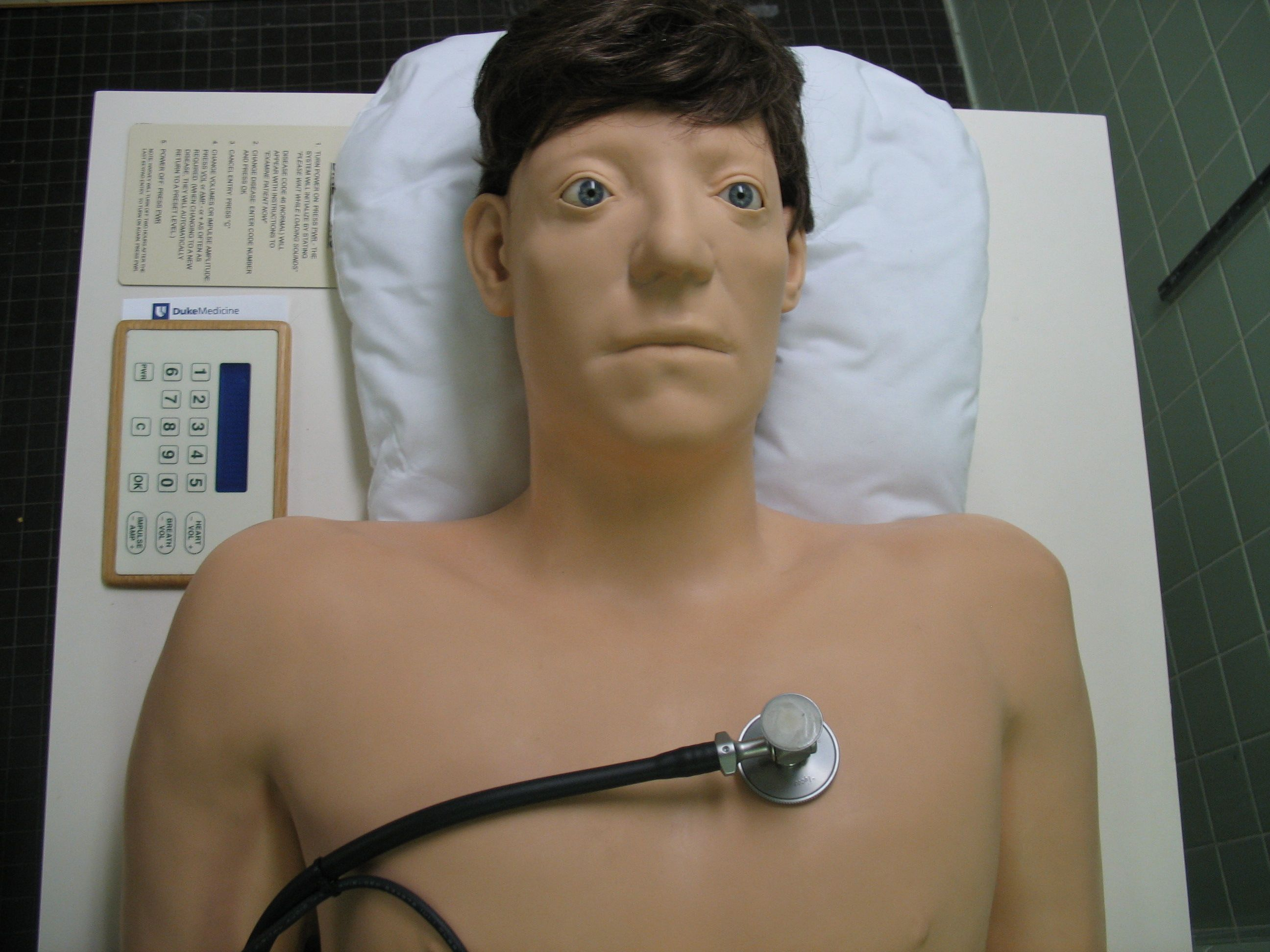
- Harvey medical simulator
- Inventor: Michael Gordon MD
- Inception: 1968
- Manufacturer: University of Miami
- Available: Currently available
- Current supplier: Laerdal Corporation
- Website: https://gordoncenter.miami.edu/Harvey/

Harvey was one of the earliest medical simulators available for training of health care professionals. Harvey was created in 1968 by Dr. Michael S. Gordon at the University of Miami. Harvey is currently sold by the Laerdal Corporation.

== Background ==
Considered one of the groundbreaking products in medical simulation, the cardiopulmonary patient simulator Harvey provides a method of standardized testing for real-time procedures, and skills of the trainee, usually a medical student or resident.

First demonstrated in 1968, the Harvey simulator is a mannequin that performs more than 25 different cardiac functions of the human body, varying blood pressure, breathing, pulse, heart sounds and heart murmurs. As years have passed, Harvey has been upgraded with the addition of more advanced cardiac functions, with the intention of creating a general and also in-depth program in cardiology.

Harvey is used to teach all levels of medical education. For beginners, the simulator is used to teach blood pressure measurement techniques and help students recognize a heart murmur. For more senior level medical students, Harvey can mimic heart sound variation with respiration, along with a variety of cardiac issues, such as carotid or jugular venous pulsations.

Medical students and cardiologists are not the only people who use mannequins such as Harvey to learn bedside techniques. Other specialties, such as anesthesiology, internal medicine, and Emergency Medicine, have also seen benefit from the trainer. Combat medics and other military personnel also use this technology to improve their skills.

== Educational rationale ==
The Harvey Simulator is a tool for medical education. Harvey was created mainly to improve cardiovascular bedside skills in medical personnel. By mimicking the basic cardiac functions of the human body, Harvey provides a much more realistic training exercise than a traditional classroom lecture. By removing the risk of working on a real patient, simulators prepare medical students, or anyone else who uses the device, for real-world situations.

As the medical world becomes more complex, more demand is placed on the need for training techniques that do not rely upon living patients, and Harvey is one of the answers to this demand. It and other similar simulators are considered effective teaching tools, since medical students are more willing to attempt to learn on a mannequin than on a patient volunteer, and this saves both the teacher and the student valuable time.

Studies with medical students have shown a significant difference between cardiology elective scores for students who used Harvey and students who did not.

== History ==
The Harvey mannequin was named after W. Proctor Harvey, a physician at Georgetown University and mentor of the Mannequin's creator, Dr. Michael Gordon.

Before the Harvey simulator, there were other models such as Resusci Anne, designed to teach mouth-to-mouth ventilation, which did not actually simulate much of anything, and the lesser known Sim One, one of the first computer-driven simulators designed to simulate an entire human patient.

Originally, three Harvey simulators were created, each representing a different disease. Since then, Harvey has been advanced to the point where it can simulate multiple diseases.

Harvey's inner functions went through three main stages of development. The prototype used telephone relays and a four track tape to create heart movement and sounds, respectively. The first commercial model used a series of cams and levers instead of telephone relays, but kept the 4-track tape recordings for sound. When the manufacturer of the tape recorder (Ampro Corp) went out of business, a sound card was integrated to mimic heart sounds. The third and current version of this simulator uses a servo motor and a sound card to mimic the cardiovascular functions of the human body.

The first version of Harvey cost around $100,000, but the upgrades of a sound card and a servo motor cut the cost to around $50,000.

Along with the second version of Harvey came a set of slides to show images of echoes and other medical imaging pieces helpful when diagnosing the disease. These slide programs were around 1998 replaced with software that allowed for video recordings. This software came in 1985, around the time of the first aortic stenosis, and was designed around that case. Part of diagnosing aortic stenosis is listening to sounds in the neck, which in the first Harvey version was not possible because it had no neck sounds. The software also contains the images and videos from the original slide programs, along with the history of the patient.

== Description ==
The current version of the Harvey simulator can mimic six different breath sounds, nine different cardiac auscultation areas, 30 different cardiac diseases, and 12 digitally driven impulses. The amplitude and intensity of the heartbeat is changeable. The trainees utilize a built-in stethoscope to listen to the sounds. Trainees may also manually palpate the pulses.

When using Harvey, trainees also use the slide programs, which provide additional sources of instruction by giving patient history, examples of laboratory findings from real patients who had the disease, as well as therapeutic decisions, pathologic data, and epidemiological data. Slide programs have since been replaced with computer programs that provide video instead of still pictures.

Both the hardware and the software for this simulator were developed at the Medical Training and Simulation Laboratory at the University of Miami School of Medicine.

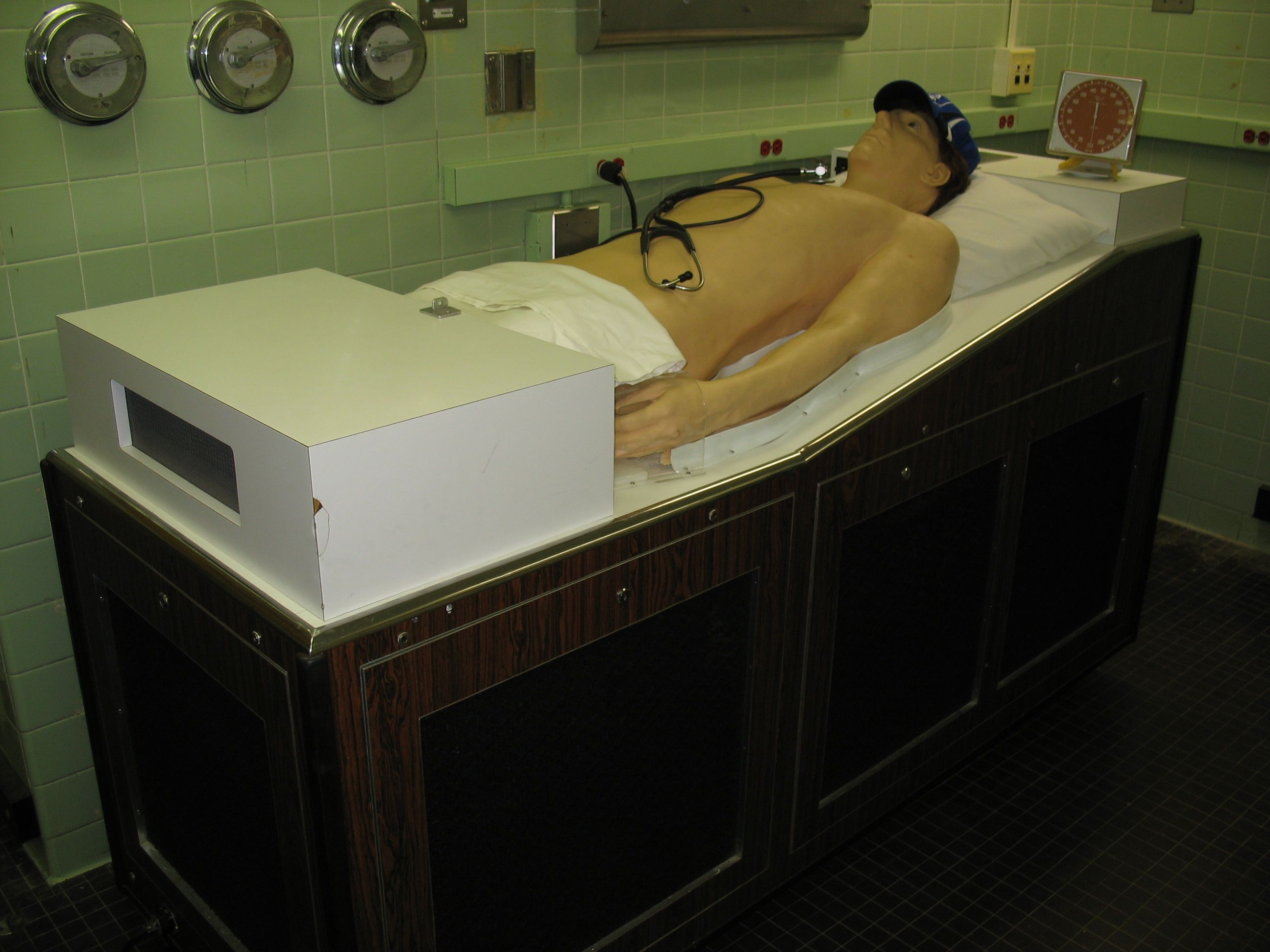
Older version of Harvey Cardiovascular Patient Simulator

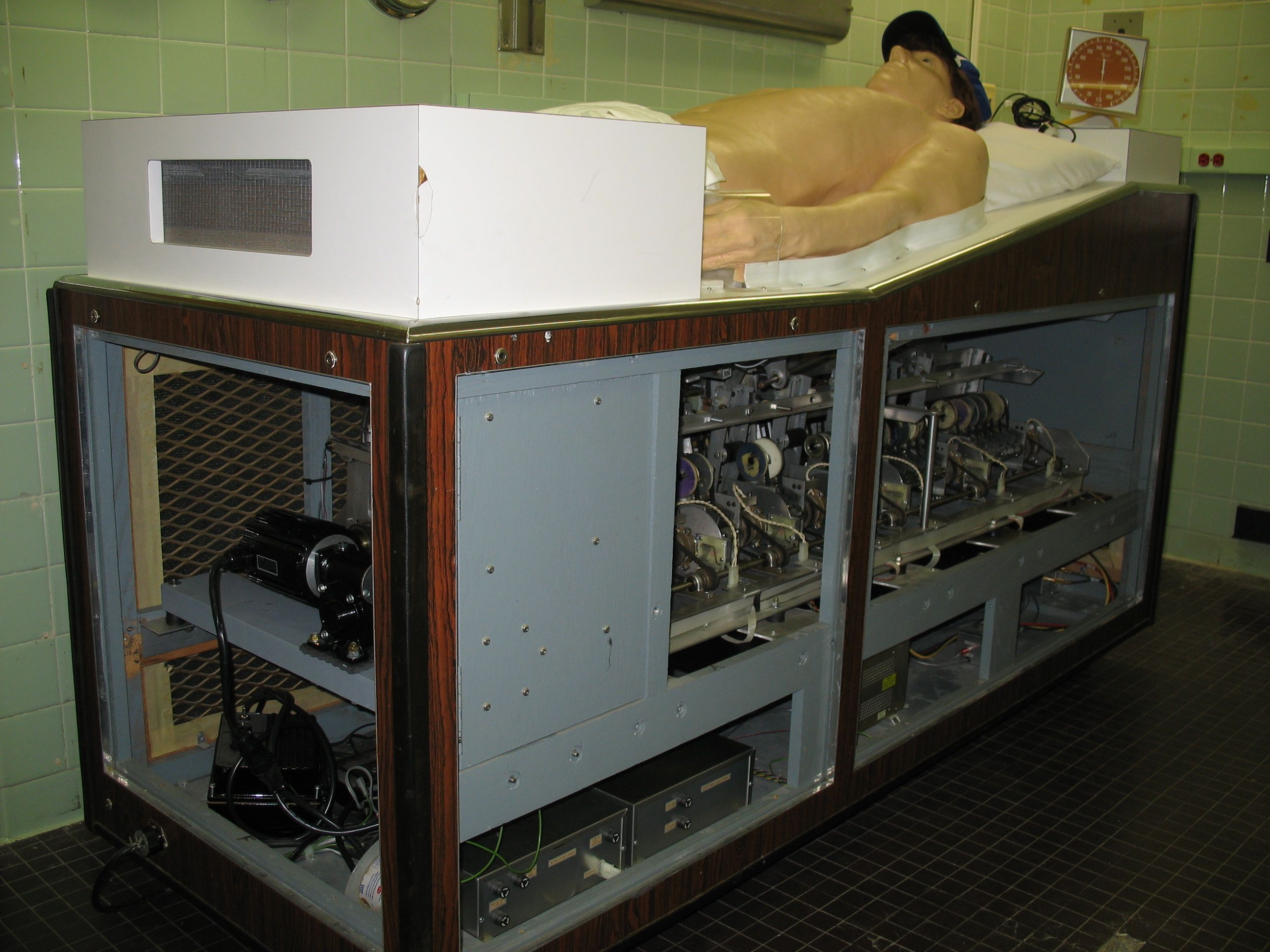
Removing panels on sides of older version of Harvey shows internal structure.

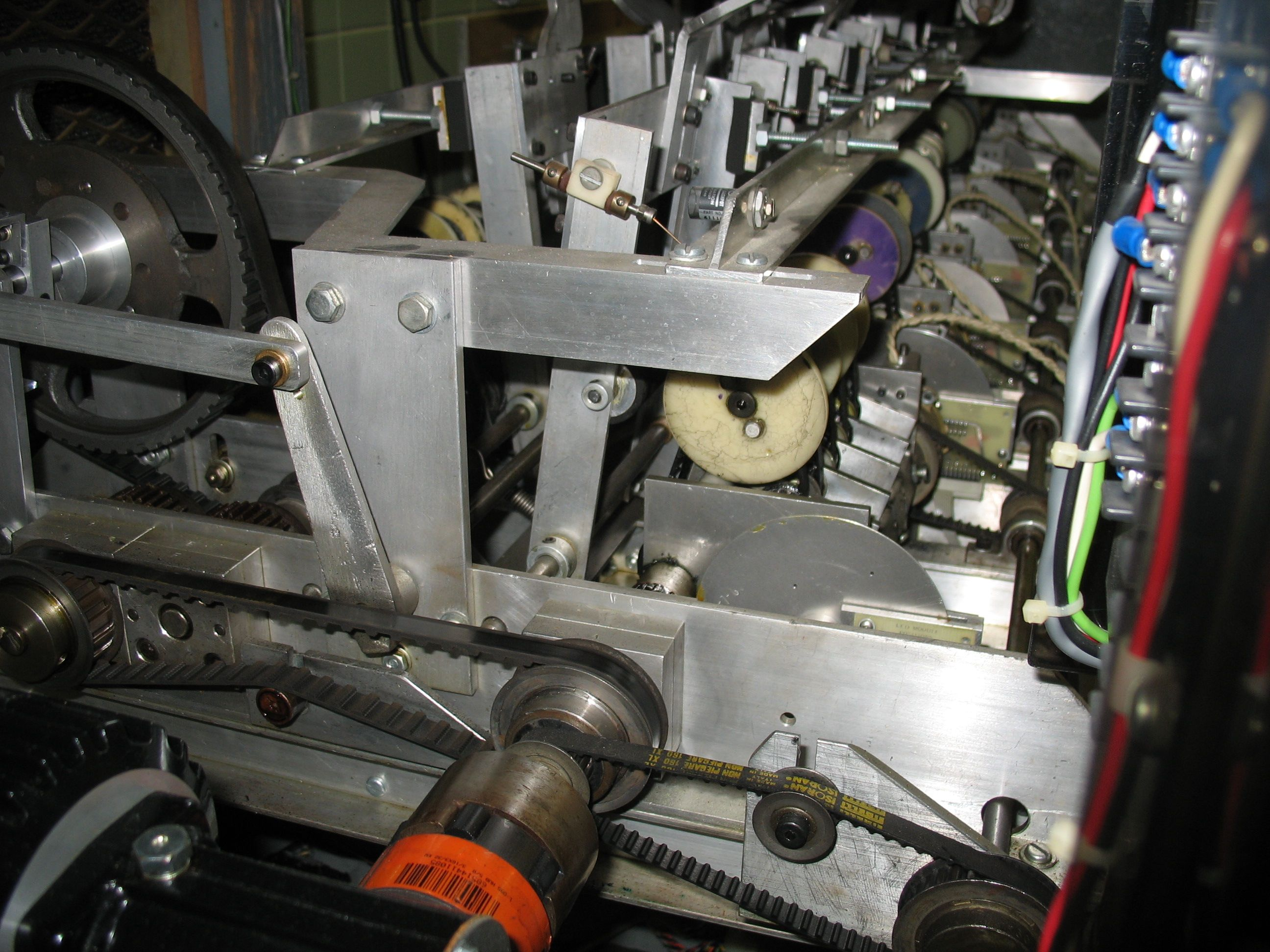
View of internal structure of older version of Harvey. Motor, shown near bottom of image, drives cam shaft shown.

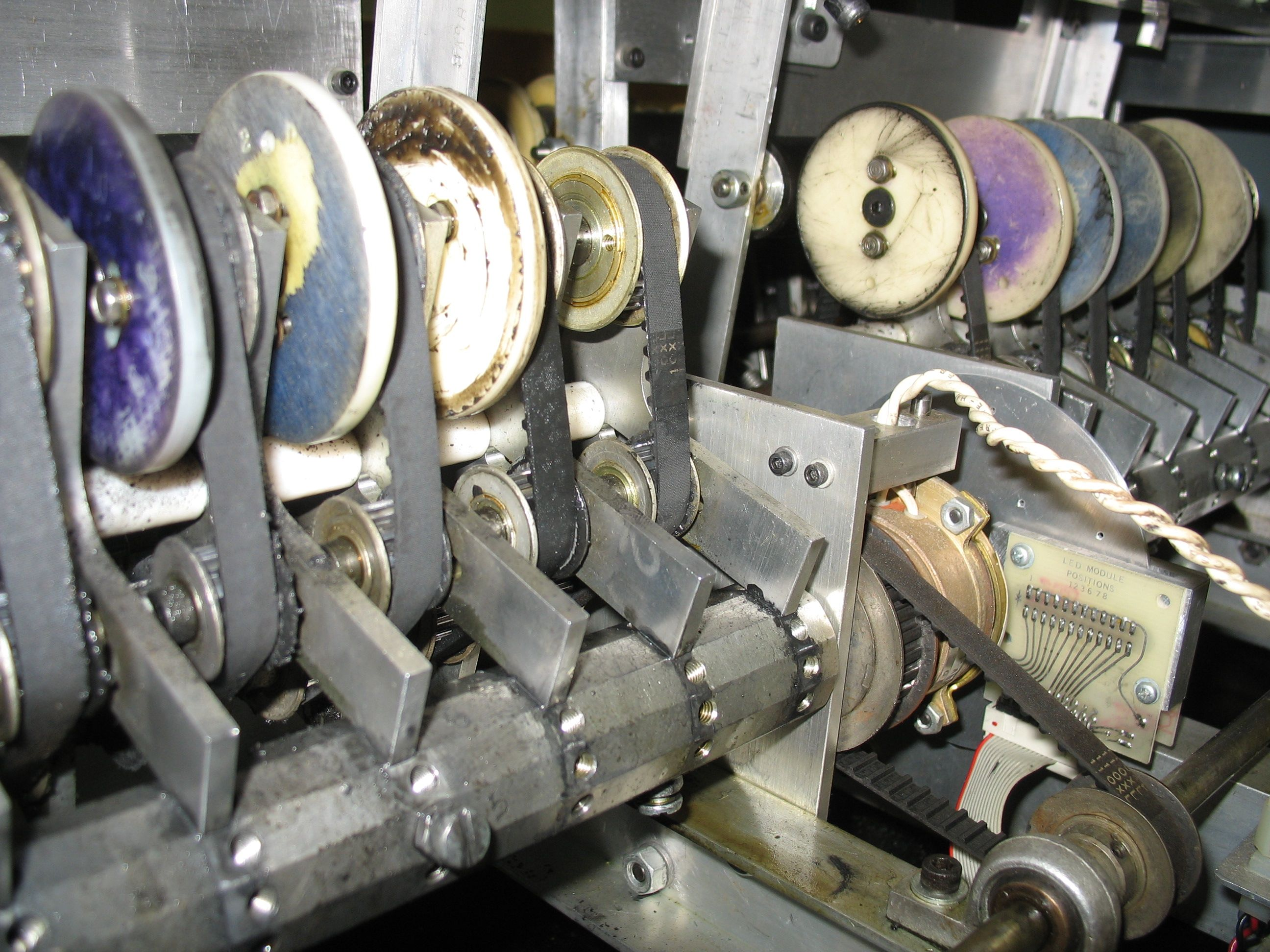
Lever guides along cam shaft have more elliptical shape to create movement needed.

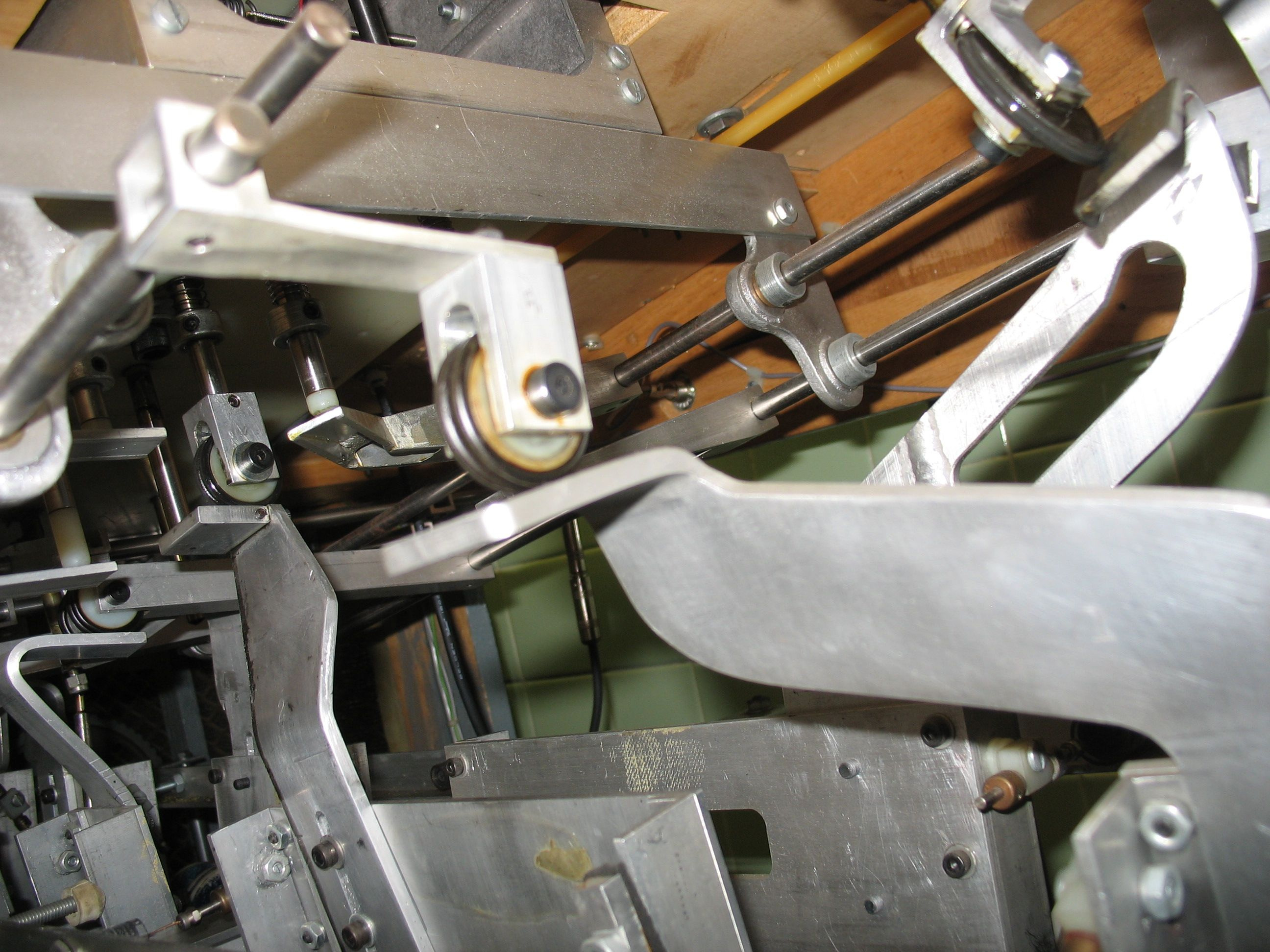
Guides move levers. Plungers are attached to roller mechanism shown here to create movement of pulses and heart.

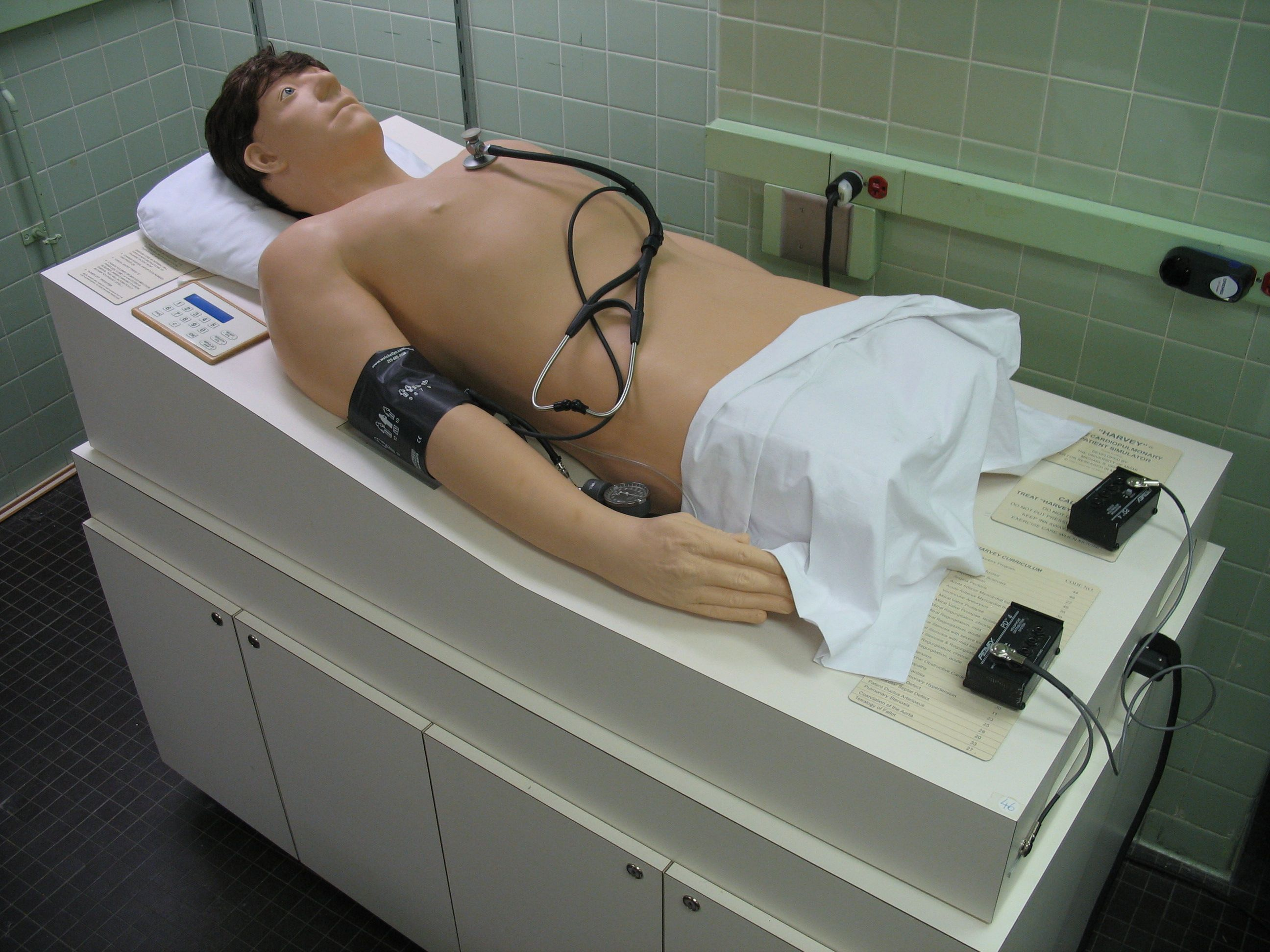
Current version of Harvey along with its base. Black boxes at bottom allow for sound to be transmitted to multiple users.

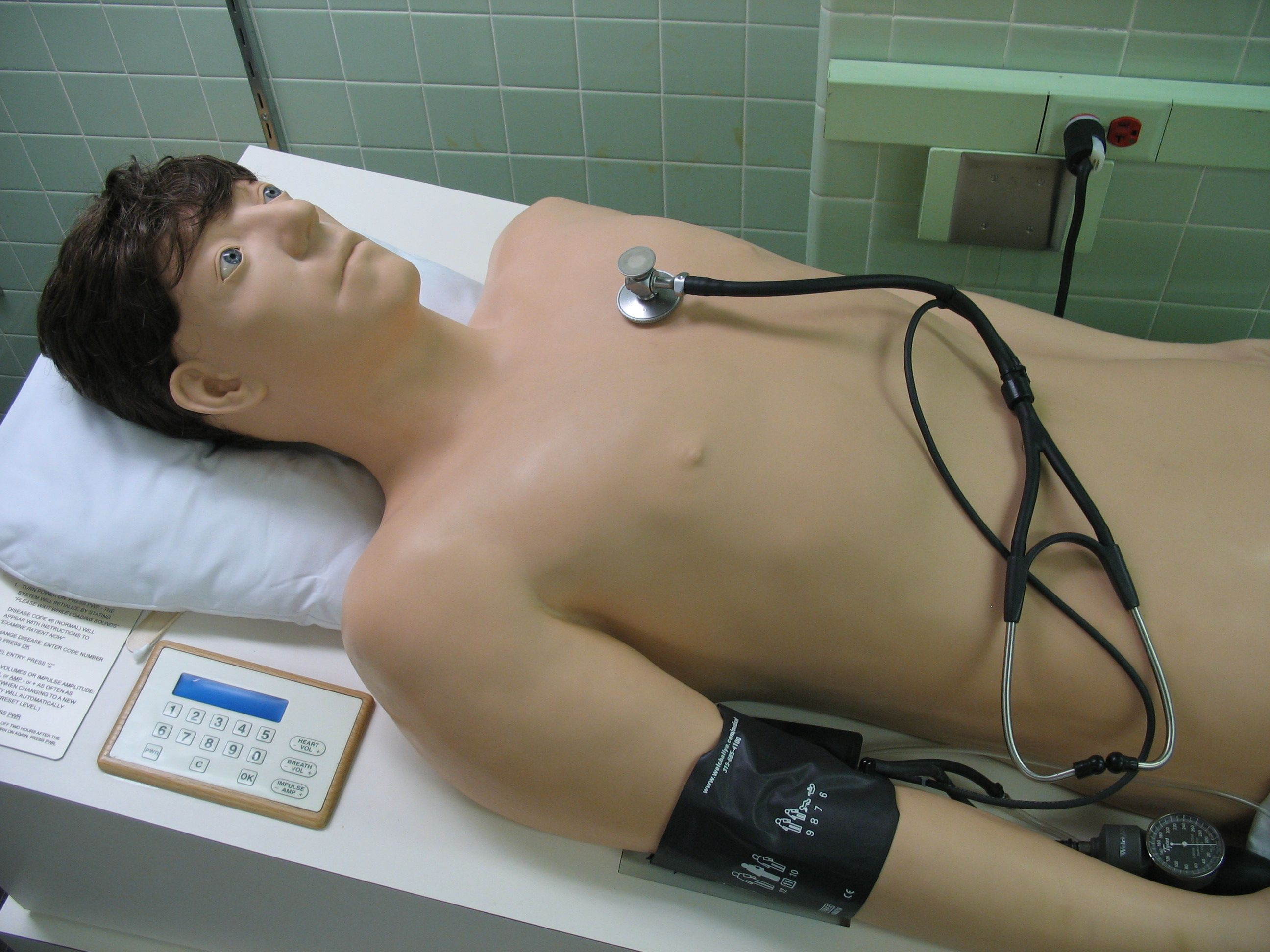
Current version of Harvey showing stethoscope and control interface.

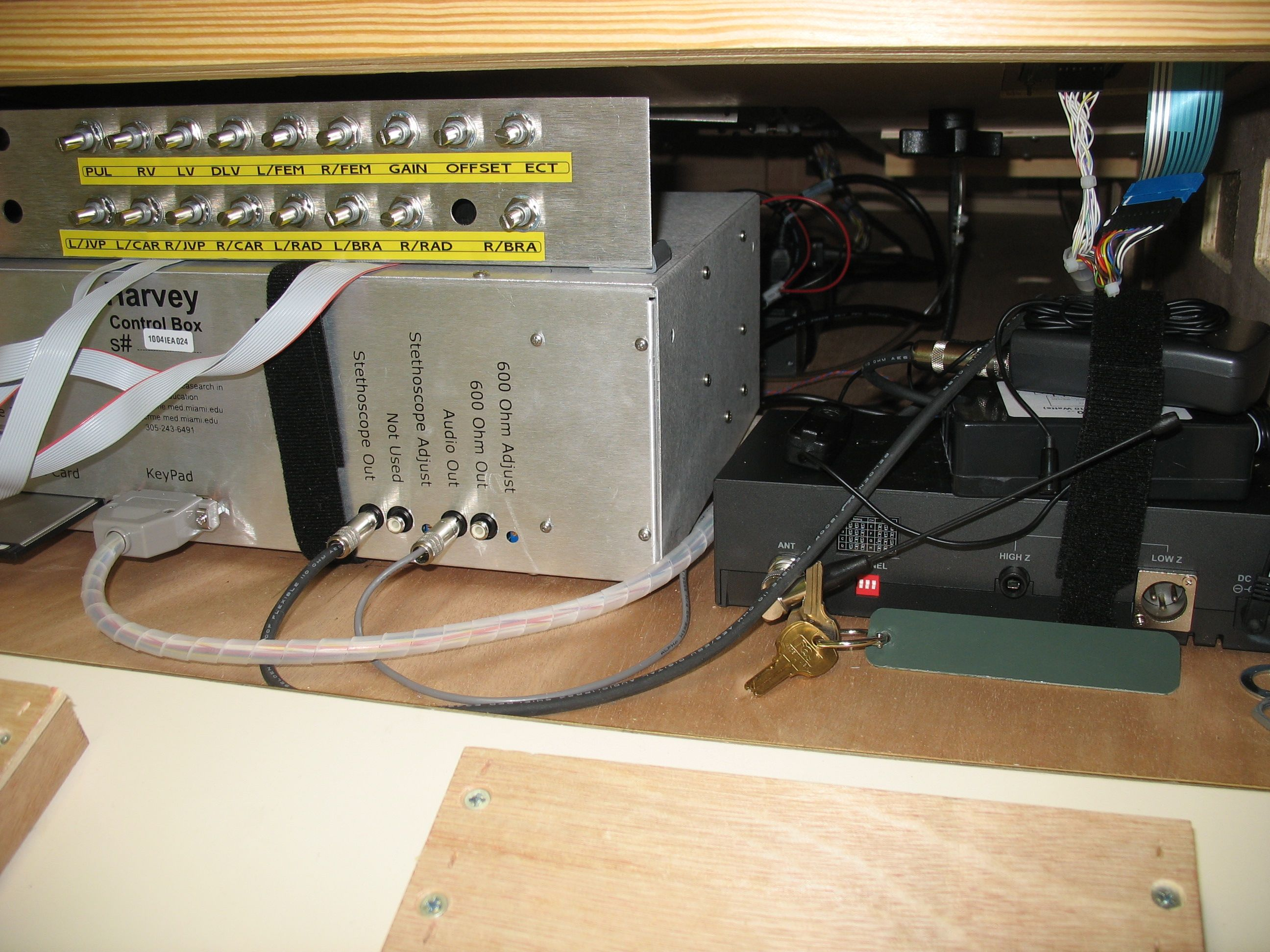
Internal control box is on left with potentiometers to control movement and sounds for current version of Harvey.
