= CXL =

CXL may refer to:

== Science and technology ==
- Compute Express Link, a computer processor interface
- Corneal cross-linking, an eye surgery treatment
- CXL 1020, an experimental heart drug

== Other uses ==
- 140 (number), in Roman numerals
- Calexico International Airport (IATA and FAA LID codes), California, US
