= James Elam (physician) =

American physician (1918–1995)

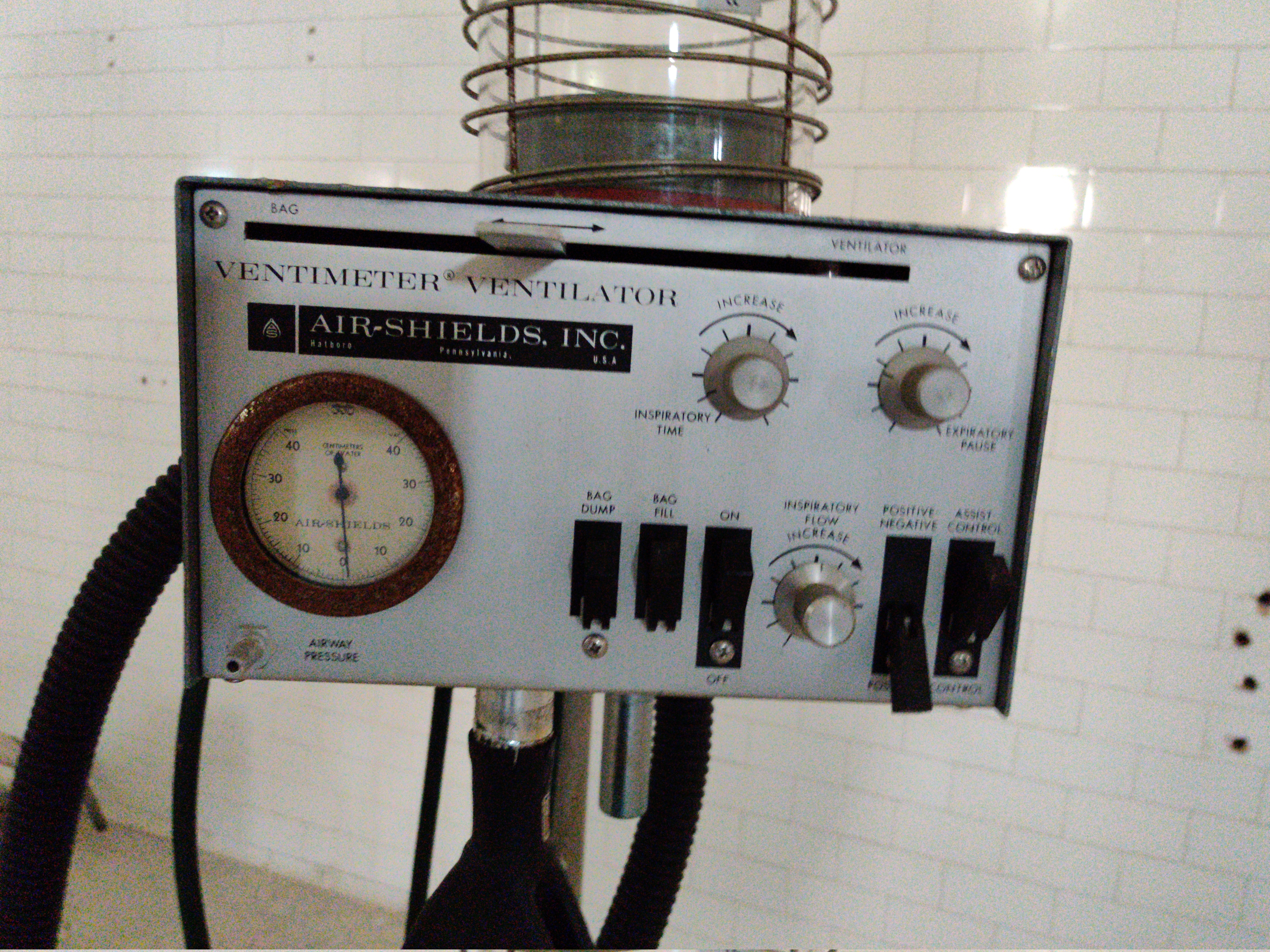
Ventimeter ventilator by Air-Shields, Inc

James Otis Elam (May 31, 1918 – July 10, 1995) was an American physician and respiratory researcher.

Elam was born in Austin, Texas. He completed his undergraduate education at the University of Texas at Austin in 1942. He then studied at Johns Hopkins University School of Medicine. After doing an internship at Bethesdal Naval Hospital in 1945-1946 Elam went to the University of Minnesota for advanced studies.

Based on his research at Roswell Park Comprehensive Cancer Center in Buffalo, New York for understanding carbon dioxide absorption, he developed a prototype ventilator device that efficiently could absorb carbon dioxide during surgery, dubbed the Roswell Park ventilator. This was further developed into the Air-Shields Ventimeter ventilator that were used for a period of almost 50 years.

Elam contributed significantly to the development and understanding of modern rescue breathing, cardiopulmonary resuscitation (CPR), and brought it to the attention of the medical community and the general public. In 1954, Elam was the first to demonstrate experimentally that cardiopulmonary resuscitation (CPR) was a sound technique, and together with Dr. Peter Safar he demonstrated its superiority to previous methods.

Elam wrote the instructional booklet Rescue Breathing, which was distributed throughout the U.S. in 1959. He also participated in producing films demonstrating the life-saving technique and contributed with Peter Safar in the development of a mannequin called Resusci Anne, produced by Laerdal of Norway, that allowed the public to learn the technique in a safe manner.

Elam received his medical doctorate from Johns Hopkins School of Medicine in 1945. For his achievements in emergency medicine, Elam received a United States Army Certificate of Achievement, and in 1962, the Albion O. Bernstein Award, the Medical Society of the state of New York's highest honor.

In 1968, Elam, together with Robert Bauer, founded of the Society for Obstetric Anesthesia and Perinatology (SOAP).

== See also ==
- History of cardiopulmonary resuscitation
- Mechanical ventilation
