= Disc biacuplasty =

Medical procedure to ablate pain-inducing neurons in disk annuli

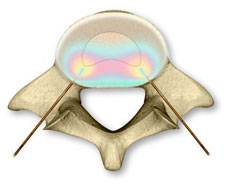
- Placement of radio frequency-generated heat probes during a disc biacuplasty
- Specialty: Orthopedic

Disk biacuplasty is a medical procedure that applies heat to the annulus of disks that separate the vertebra of the back with the goal of ablating the neurons that generate pain sensations. The procedure is designed to reduce chronic back pain caused by the intervertebral discs. The procedure is in the early stages of testing with some evidence of efficacy.

As possible advantages to conventional techniques, the developers of the procedure cite its ease of use and a lack of artificial concentric fissures. The procedure may destroy pain nerves without damaging nearby tissues, though evidence for this comes only from studies with cadavers. Testing on pigs suggested it heats the desired area without damaging the dorsal root ganglia or spinal nerve roots, though the cells of the disc demonstrate histological changes.

== See also ==
- Intervertebral disc annuloplasty
