= CXL 1020 =

Experimental drug

CXL 1020 is an experimental drug that is being investigated as a treatment for acute decompensated heart failure. CXL 1020 functions as a nitroxyl donor; nitroxyl is the reduced, protonated version of nitric oxide. Nitroxyl is capable of enhancing left ventricular contractility without increasing heart rate by modifying normal Ca^{2+} cycling through the sarcoplasmic reticulum as well as increasing the sensitivity of cardiac myofilaments to Ca^{2+}.

== Acute decompensated heart failure ==
Patients with acute decompensated heart failure have diminished left ventricular systolic and/or diastolic functioning. Impaired ventricular function can be a consequence of decreased sarcoplasmic reticulum Ca^{2+} cycling and a corresponding decline in cardiomyocyte contraction. Reduced ventricular functioning limits the ability of the ventricles to fill with blood and pump blood to the rest of the body.

== Sarcoplasmic reticulum Ca^{2+} Cycling ==
There are two mechanisms through which CXL 1020 is able to enhance the movement of Ca^{2+} in and out of the sarcoplasmic reticulum. Sarcoplasmic reticulum CaATPase (SERCA) is an energy-dependent ion pump found the sarcoplasmic reticulum of cardiac myocytes that is responsible for transporting Ca^{2+} within the cytosol back in to the lumen of the sarcoplasmic reticulum. The nitroxyl group that is donated by CXL 1020 initiates glutathiolation of SERCA at the cysteine 674 site, which in turn activates ATP-dependent Ca2+ transport. Therefore, stimulation of SERCA leads to accelerated uptake of Ca^{2+} from the cytosol of the cardiac myocyte.

Secondly, the nitroxyl group from CXL 1020 interacts with ryanodine receptors (RyR), specifically RyR2, which is the predominant form found in cardiac tissue. Ryanodine receptors are located within the membrane of the sarcoplasmic reticulum and function to release Ca^{2+} required for myofilament activation (Guyton, 2006). Nitroxyl interacts with RyR2 to increase the probability of Ryanodine receptor opening, thereby enhancing Ca^{2+} release from the sarcoplasmic reticulum. It is thought that nitroxyl modifies RyR2 function through its interaction with thiol groups present in the receptor, although the exact mechanism is unknown.

== Cardiac myocyte contractility ==
Nitroxyl has also been shown to increase the sensitivity to cardiac myocytes to Ca^{2+}, which in turn enhances the force of contraction. Its hypothesized that nitroxyl interacts with thiol groups present in myofilament proteins to increase the maximal Ca^{2+} activated force of the myofilament, although the exact effect of nitroxyl on the myofilament is unknown.
