= Intervertebral disc annuloplasty =

- Specialty: Neurosurgery
- ICD-9-CM: 80.5

The term intervertebral disc annuloplasty indicates any procedure aimed at repairing the annulus of a bulging intervertebral disc before it herniates.

== Intradiscal electrothermal annuloplasty ==
IDET (intradiscal electrothermal annuloplasty) is a minimally invasive form of annuloplasty consisting of the insertion of a hollow needle into the affected disc. Through this needle, a heating wire is passed. Once the wire has reached the disc, it is heated to 90 °C for approximately fifteen minutes. The heat is intended to seal any ruptures in the disc wall and may also burn nerve endings, which can make the area less sensitive to pain.

== See also ==
- Disc biacuplasty
