= Peter Safar =

Austrian physician (1924–2003)

- Born: 12 April 1924; Vienna, Austria
- Died: 3 August 2003 (aged 79); Mount Lebanon, Pennsylvania, U.S.
- Education: University of Vienna, Yale University, University of Pennsylvania
- Known for: Cardiopulmonary resuscitation
- Scientific career
- Fields: Anesthesiology

Peter Safar (12 April 1924 – 3 August 2003) was an Austrian anesthesiologist of Czech Jewish descent. He is credited with pioneering cardiopulmonary resuscitation (CPR).

== Early life ==
Safar was born in Vienna, Austria, in 1924 into a prominent Jewish medical family. His father, Karl Safar, was an ophthalmologist, and his mother, Vinca Safar-Landauer, was a pediatrician. Both were fired from their jobs under the Nuremberg Laws after the Anschluss, and Safar was not allowed to register for university. However, Safar ultimately escaped the Holocaust and graduated from the University of Vienna in 1948. He married Eva Kyzivat, of Czech descent, and moved from Vienna to Hartford, Connecticut, in 1949 for surgical training at Yale University. He completed training in anesthesiology at the University of Pennsylvania in 1952.

== Career ==
In 1952 Safar worked in Lima, Peru, and founded the first academic anesthesiology department in the country. In 1954, he became chief of the department of anesthesiology at Baltimore City Hospital.

=== Development of CPR techniques ===
Together with James Elam, he rediscovered the initial steps in CPR. These included the head tilt and chin lift maneuver to open the airway of an unconscious victim, as well as the mouth-to-mouth breathing. He influenced Norwegian doll maker Asmund Laerdal of Laerdal company to design and manufacture mannequins for CPR training called Resusci Anne. Safar, who began to work on CPR in 1956 at Baltimore City Hospital, demonstrated in a series of experiments on paralyzed human volunteers that rescuer exhaled-air mouth-to-mouth breathing could maintain satisfactory oxygen levels in the non-spontaneously breathing victim, and showed that even laypeople could effectively perform mouth-to-mouth breathing to save lives. He combined the A (Airway) and B (Breathing) components of CPR with the C (chest compressions). He wrote the book ABC of Resuscitation in 1957, which established the basis for mass training of CPR. This A-B-C system for CPR training of the public was later adopted by the American Heart Association, which promulgated standards for CPR in 1973.

=== Other achievements and contributions ===
Safar's other achievements included the establishment of the United States' first intensive-care unit in 1958, at Baltimore City Hospital. In 1961, he went to the University of Pittsburgh, where he established its notable academic anesthesiology department and the world's first intensive-care medicine training program. In 1966, he was deeply moved by the death of his daughter, Elizabeth, at the age of 12 from an acute asthmatic crisis. He initiated the Freedom House Enterprise Ambulance Service, one of the first prehospital emergency medical services in the United States in 1967 and together with Dr. Nancy Caroline, developed standards for emergency medical technician (EMT) education and training, as well as standards for mobile intensive-care ambulance design and equipment. Freedom House Ambulance service employed young African Americans who were deemed "unemployable". Several members of Freedom House went on to establish successful careers in EMS and public safety.

In 1970, Safar was among a group of 29 individuals meeting in Los Angeles, California who co-founded the Society of Critical Care Medicine. Dr. Safar served in 1971 as the Society's second president, following the founding president Dr. Max Harry Weil.

In 1976, Safar co-founded the World Association for Disaster and Emergency Medicine (WADEM), which is dedicated to saving lives in major disasters. He stepped down from the chairmanship of anesthesiology at the University of Pittsburgh and founded the International Resuscitation Research Center in 1979, dedicated to cardiopulmonary cerebral resuscitation (CPCR).

With Nicholas Bircher he published a textbook on CPCR that became the international standard. In March 1989, he assembled an interdisciplinary team of researchers – composed of the following individuals: Miroslav Klain, M.D. (Anesthesiologist), Edmund Ricci, Ph.D. (Evaluation research), Ernesto A. Pretto Jr., M.D. (Anesthesiologist), Joel Abrams, Ph.D. (Engineering), and Louise Comfort, Ph.D. (Social Science) – which became known as the University of Pittsburgh Disaster Reanimatology Study Group (DRSG). This research team in partnership with a team of Russian and Armenian physicians conducted the first international interdisciplinary disaster evaluation research field survey study of the earthquake in Armenia. The Armenia study led to a series of post-disaster field studies by the DRSG in Costa Rica (1991), Turkey (1993), and Japan (1994). These studies helped to establish the "Golden 24 Hours" of emergency response in disasters and inspired Norwegian anesthesiologist and humanitarian Dr. Knut Ole Sundnes to establish in 1995 the Task Force of Quality Control of Disaster Management (TFQCDM), under the auspices of the Nordic Society of Disaster Medicine and WADEM.

Safar practiced and taught clinical anesthesiology at Presbyterian University Hospital in Pittsburgh until the age of 65, but he continued his research activities until his death. His lifelong goal was to "save the hearts and brains of those too young to die" and to improve the life-saving potential in disasters, a field he called "Disaster Reanimatology." In 1990, he appointed Ernesto Pretto, M.D., as leader of the Disaster program.

== Honors and legacy ==
In 1999, Safar was awarded the Cross of Honor, Austria's highest civilian honor, for his services in the field of medicine. He was nominated three times for the Nobel Prize in Medicine. On 13 September 2014, the Alliance of Germanic Societies of Pittsburgh honored him, as well.

The University of Pittsburgh renamed the International Resuscitation Research Center after him in 1994 to honor his "innumerable contributions to the field of resuscitation medicine". Additionally, the chair of anesthesiology (now the Department of Anesthesiology & Perioperative Medicine) was named after him and his wife. Various medical organizations dedicated to the area of critical care medicine, such as the European Resuscitation Council and Society of Critical Care Medicine, have named lectures and awards after him.

== Death ==
Safar died on 3 August 2003 at his home in Mount Lebanon, Pennsylvania, from cancer.

== See also ==
- Mechanical ventilation
