= Resusci Anne =

Training mannequin used for teaching CPR

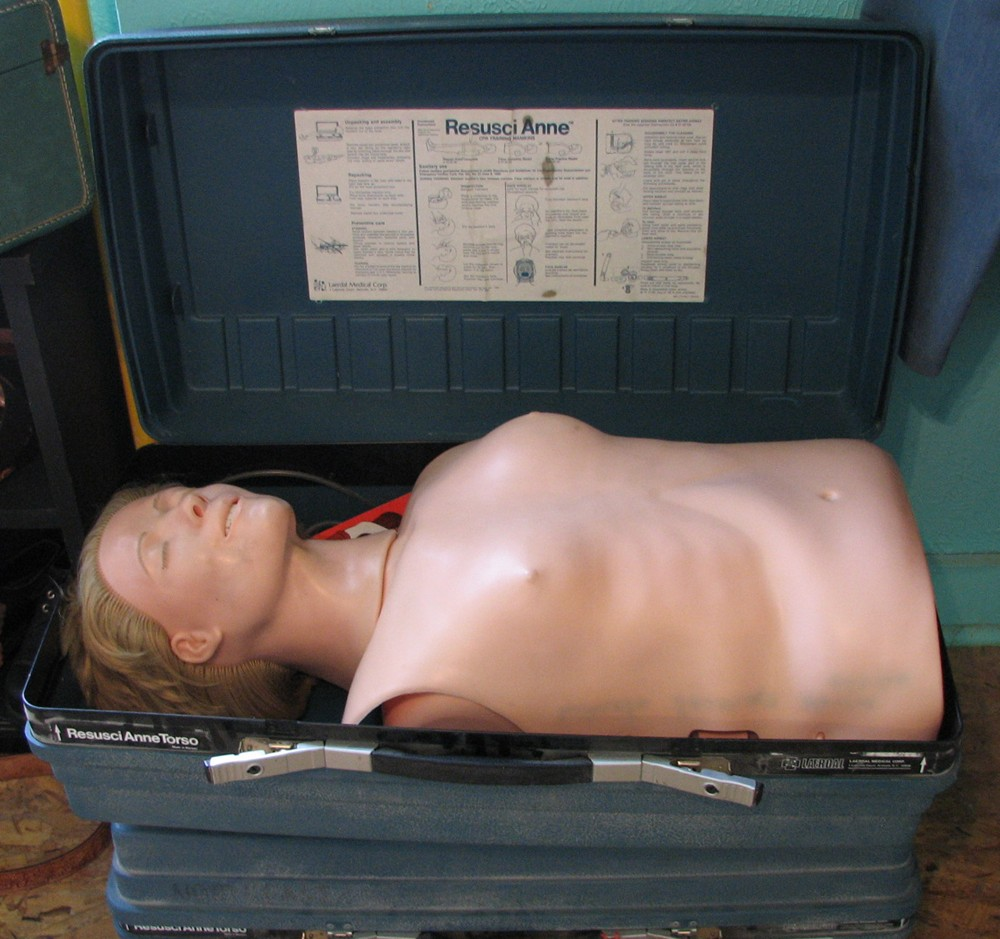
Resusci Anne in a storage case

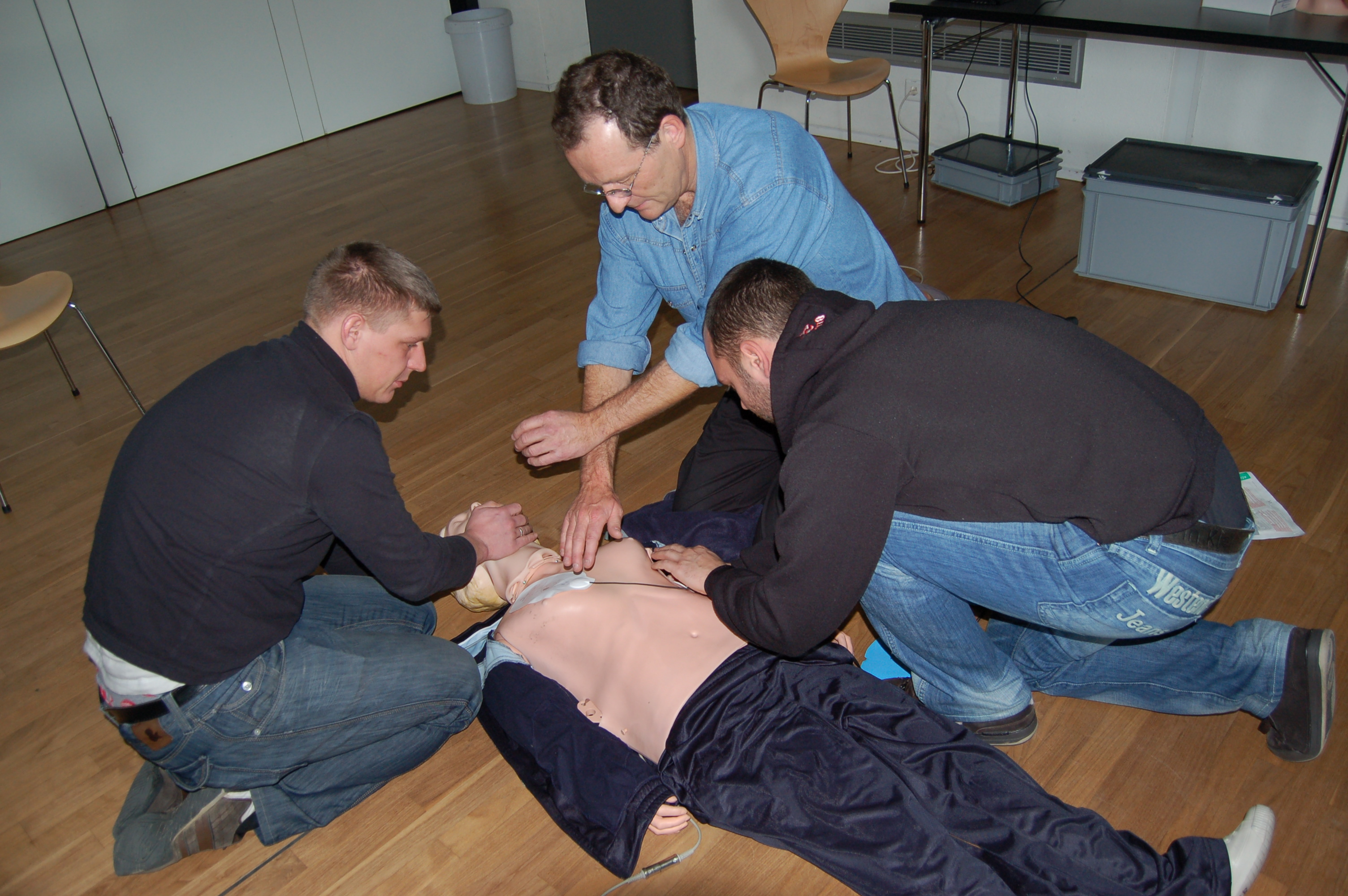
Rehearsing the use of an automated external defibrillator on a Resusci Anne

Resusci Anne, also known as Rescue Anne, Resusci Annie, CPR Annie, Resuscitation Annie, Little Annie, or CPR Doll is a model of medical simulator used for teaching both emergency workers and members of the general public. Resusci Anne was developed by Norwegian toy maker Åsmund S. Lærdal, Austrian-Czech medical doctor Peter Safar, and American medical doctor James Elam, and is produced by the company Laerdal Medical.

The distinctive face of Resusci Anne was based on L'Inconnue de la Seine (English: The unknown woman of Seine), the death mask of an unidentified young woman reputedly drowned in the River Seine around the late 1880s. Toymaker Åsmund S. Lærdal chose to use a woman's face on the mannequin as he thought male trainees might be reluctant to kiss a man's face. The face was sculpted by the Norwegian-Danish sculptor Emma Matthiasen.

The first version of Resusci-Annie was presented by Lærdal at the First International Symposium on Resuscitation at Stavanger, Norway, in 1960. Peter Safar and James Elam were attending the conference. Together they would join Lærdal in refining the design. Later versions included a simulated carotid pulse, eye-pupils that could dilate and constrict, and a system for recording the trainee's resuscitation performance on a paper tape.

== In popular culture ==
The chorus refrain, "Annie, are you OK?" in Michael Jackson's "Smooth Criminal" was inspired by Resusci Anne. Trainees learn to say, "Annie, are you OK?" while practicing resuscitation on the dummy.

Track 12 of Frank Turner's 2019 album, No Man's Land recounts the story of Rescue Annie.

Stanford University Professor Lochlann Jain has written on the role of the doll in relation to the history of drowning.
