= Laerdal =

Multinational healthcare technology company

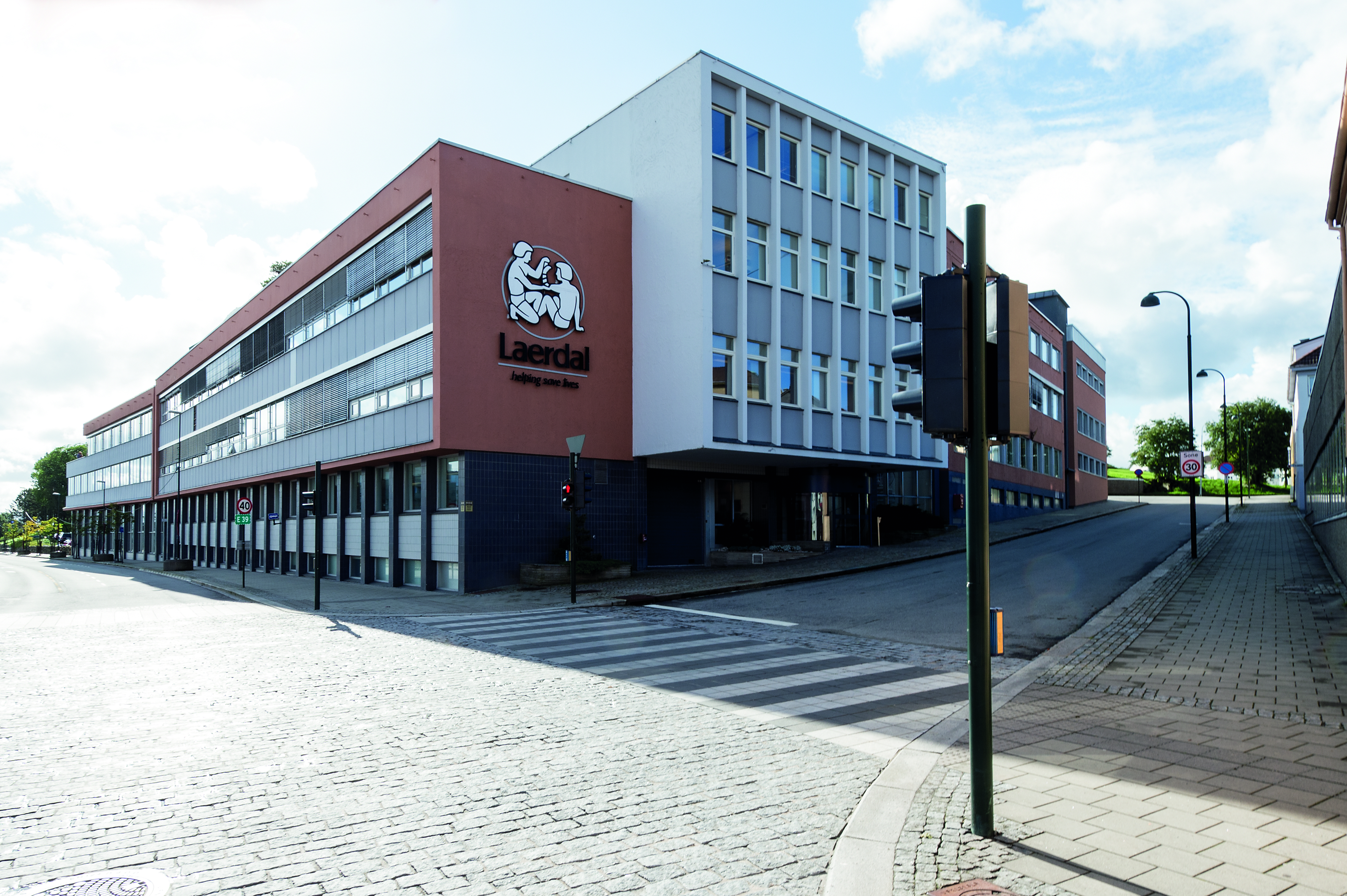
Laerdal Headquarters

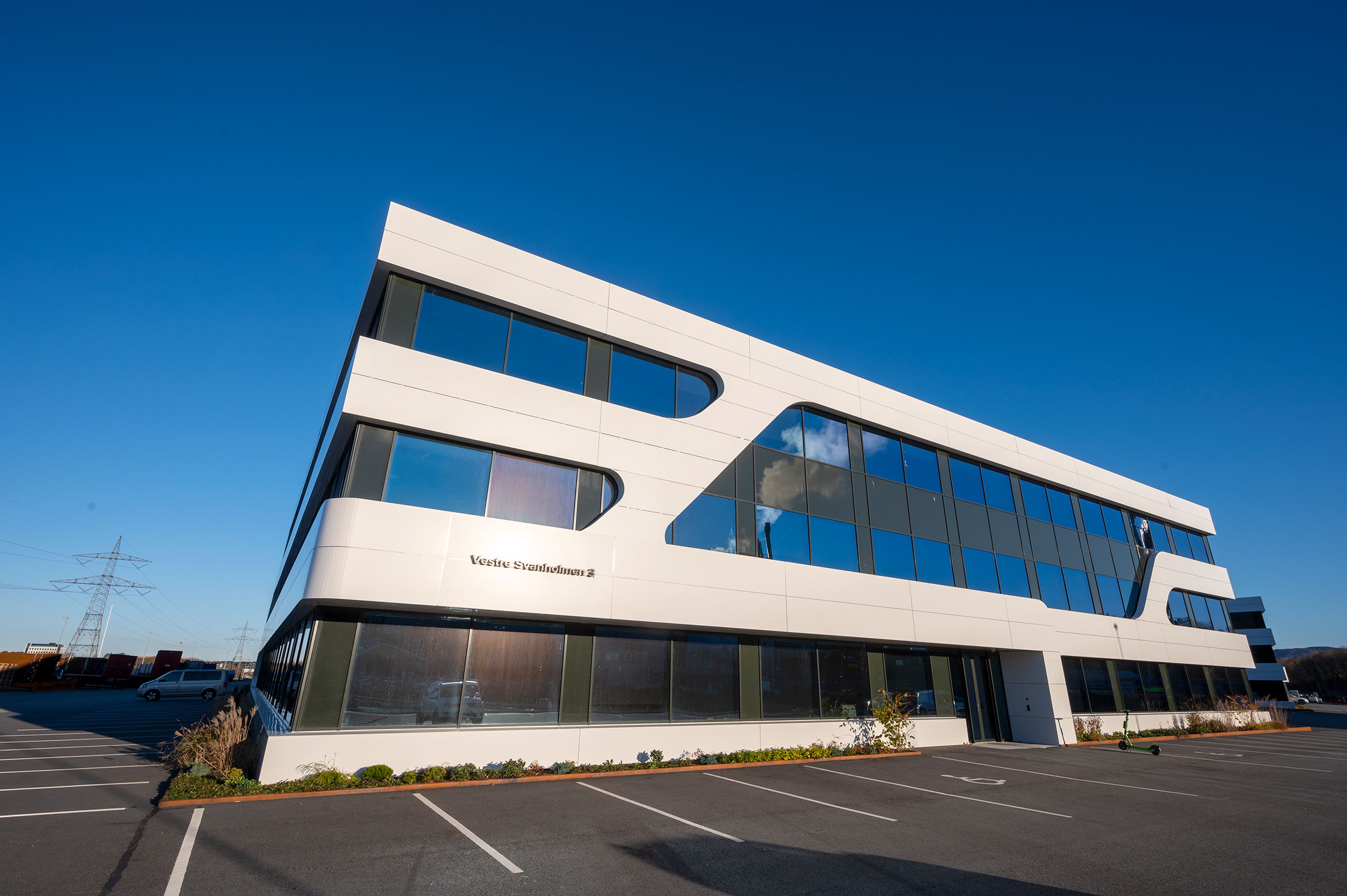
Laerdal Office in Forus

Laerdal is a multinational company that develops products and programs for healthcare providers, voluntary organizations, educational institutions, hospitals, and the military worldwide. Laerdal has over 2,000 employees in 26 countries. The headquarters is located in Stavanger, Norway.

== History ==
Laerdal was founded in 1940 by Åsmund S. Lærdal as a children's publishing and toy company. During the years as a toy developer, Lærdal learned about a synthetic plastic material, now known as PVC, that was suited for the casting of toys and dolls. The use of soft plastics revolutionized the toy industry and by 1960, more than 100 million toy cars, under the brand Tomte, had been sold in 100 countries. The Laerdal Anne doll was named "Toy of the Year" and became a bestseller throughout Europe. Due to this experience with soft plastics, The Norwegian Civil Defense called on Laerdal to design natural-looking imitation wounds for military training. In 1958, Laerdal was approached by Norwegian anesthesiologist Dr. Bjørn Lind after learning from Dr. Peter Safar about the need for a lifelike manikin to train the new concept of mouth-to-mouth ventilation. Together, Laerdal, Lind and Safar developed the world's first patient simulator, Resusci Anne, which was introduced in 1960.

The face of Resusci Anne was inspired by the death mask of an unidentified girl who was found drowned in the River Seine in Paris at the turn of the 19th century. Resusci Anne would become the predecessor of a series of manikins used to teach cardiopulmonary resuscitation (CPR).

== Resuscitation training ==
During the next 60 years, Laerdal resuscitation training manikins were developed to train both healthcare providers and the general population in the lifesaving skill of CPR. It is estimated by the American Heart Association that resuscitation training manikins have been used to train 500 million people worldwide saving an estimated 2.5 million lives. Laerdal's resuscitation training is used to strengthen the Chain of Survival. The Chain of Survival illustrates the sequence of interventions for cardiac arrest that have been shown to improve survival from sudden cardiac arrest.

== Healthcare simulation ==
Today, medical errors result in an estimated 4.1 million deaths globally, every year. The methodology of simulation training in healthcare education has gained widespread recognition within the field of healthcare as a tool for reinforcing clinical skills and knowledge. Laerdal was one of the first companies to develop products for medical simulation, introducing a series of realistic human patient simulators, to enable interactive training without risk to patient safety.

As technology developed, patient manikins evolved into advanced, realistic human-like simulators used for healthcare training and medical simulation. These simulators can be used to supplement clinical practice. In a large-scale study examining the use of simulation in nursing, it was found that high quality simulation can replace up to 50% of clinical training hours. Simulation training allows for skills training and performance measurement. Simulators transmit feedback – measuring performance in metrics including CPR, emergency cardiovascular care (ECC), automated external defibrillator (AED), arrhythmia, blood pressure, airway and ventilation management, ultrasound diagnostics, advanced critical care, endovascular procedures, neonatal, venous and arterial, and nursing and patient care. Education is hands-on with directive feedback in audio, visual or both, with apps for smartphones and tablets. Technology that offers objective feedback during and after simulation is used for debriefing and improving learner performance.

== Flagship products ==
The well-known Resusci Anne simulator has been updated to include variation with CPR metrics feedback technology, advanced skill training, and first aid. The newborn and pediatric simulators, Resusci Junior and Resusci Baby, also allow for CPR feedback technology. Laerdal's introduced its high-fidelity simulator, SimMan 3G, in 2009. Several iterations have followed that include Simman 3G Trauma, SimMan Essential, SimMan ALS, SimMan Vascular, SimMom, SimBaby and SimNewb. In 2019, Laerdal acquired the company B-Line Medical, a debriefing, assessment, and training management platform. After a partnership signed in 2018, Laerdal Medical now offers integrated simulators with B-Line Medical technology.

== Global partnerships ==
Laerdal works with global partners such as the British Heart Foundation on their Nation of Lifesavers project to train school children to perform CPR and AED use. From September 2020, first aid and CPR will be added to the primary and secondary school curriculum in England. Similarly, Laerdal supplies the American Heart Association (AHA) with CPR training kits for use with their CPR in schools program. In the United States, 38 states now require CPR training as part of the high school graduation requirement. Together with the AHA and the Global Resuscitation Alliance, Resuscitation Quality Improvement (RQI) programs are used at hospitals to refresh the CPR skills of healthcare providers using short, frequent training sessions. Laerdal is also a partner of the National League for Nursing for patient simulation training for nursing education and collaborates with the American Academy of Pediatrics to develop neonatal resuscitation education through education and technology.

== Not-for-profit initiatives ==
Laerdal Global Health (LGH) is the not-for-profit sister company established in 2010 to help save the lives of mothers and newborns in low-income countries. Laerdal and partners provide the tools and training for safer deliveries. One of these programs, Helping Babies Breathe, has been used to train 500,000 midwives in 80 low-income countries.

The Laerdal Foundation for Acute Medicine was established in 1980 to provide financial support to practically oriented research and development in acute medicine. In recent years there has also been an added focus on projects related to saving lives at birth in low-resource settings. The foundation has supported 1600 international research projects with more than 40 million dollars in funding.

The Laerdal Foundation facilitates an annual meeting for medical researchers from around the world at the Utstein Abbey outside of Stavanger, Norway, to make recommendations for how to implement best practices in topics including resuscitation, patient simulation, maternal and neonatal mortality. The widely accepted Utstein Formula for Survival is a model that employs three elements in hypothesizing potential survival rates: medical science, educational efficiency and local implementation. The Global Resuscitation Alliance was established at the Utstein meeting to promote best practices in resuscitation research.
