= Hoboken Volunteer Ambulance Corps =

911 EMS provider in New Jersey, US

Hoboken Volunteer Ambulance Corps, Inc.
- Abbreviation: HVAC
- Formation: 1971
- Purpose: City EMS
- Headquarters: 707 Clinton St., Hoboken, New Jersey
- Region served: Hoboken and nearby cities
- Members: Approximately 200 members, paid and volunteer
- President: Tommy Molta
- Website: hobokenems.com

The Hoboken Volunteer Ambulance Corps (HVAC or Hoboken EMS) is the primary 911 EMS provider in Hoboken, New Jersey. The corps responds to nearly 5000 calls for service yearly in Hoboken and, as needed, in neighboring areas.

== History ==
The Hoboken Volunteer Ambulance Corps was initially formed in the early 1970s to augment the existing emergency medical response, which involved a police officer picking up a doctor from then-St. Mary's Hospital and driving them to the location of the call. The corps was incorporated in 1971 with fourteen members and an ambulance purchased from Avenel Volunteer First Aid Squad. In the first year, the corps responded to 648 calls, in 2011, they responded to nearly 5000.

=== Hurricane Sandy ===
In late October 2012, when much of the Northeastern United States was devastated by Hurricane Sandy, the corps engaged in a multiple-week-long operation to support the city of Hoboken in its state of emergency. Despite widespread flooding leaving large parts of the city inaccessible even to the largest rescue vehicles, the corps coordinated an effort to evacuate the low-lying Hoboken University Medical Center of its 131 patients, was forced to evacuate its building and base of operations when threatened by flooding, established a field hospital in a gym on nearby Stevens Institute of Technology, and logged over 5,000 person-hours to respond to almost 600 calls for service in the initial eight-day period.

Due to extremely heavy call volume, the city of Hoboken was supported by its neighboring communities, by an ALS "strike team" consisting of five ambulances deployed from Pennsylvania, and by elements of the 2nd Battalion 113th Infantry New Jersey Army National Guard. The corps was initially forced to use front loaders to evacuate patients from flooded areas, and later used Army National Guard cargo trucks to transport patients to waiting ambulances.

Due to the storm and its aftereffects, the corps lost four vehicles to flooding, including two of its three front line ambulances, a special operations disaster support truck, and a mobile communications bus. The corps also suffered damage to their building and lost supplies and equipment.

=== Transition to Paid Division ===
Due to difficulty securing funding, rising costs, and declining volunteer hours, the corps moved to certify two ambulances under the New Jersey Department of Health such that they could bill patients for services. The corps currently performs in "soft billing" where costs not covered by the patient's insurance are written off so that the service remains free to patients.

Starting May 1, 2022 the corps began to pay EMTs between the hours of 7 a.m. and 7 p.m. Monday to Friday to staff an ambulance to ensure around the clock coverage. The corps also staffs a paid ambulance outside of those hours in the case that volunteers are not scheduled.

=== Controversies ===
In October of 2022 an anonymous complaint was filed under the Smoke Free Air Act with the local department claiming that administrators of the corps were smoking indoors even while children and pregnant women were in the building. It was alleged that the behavior had been occurring on a daily basis for "multiple years". The president acknowledged that the claim was true and stated that it would not occur going forward. It is unknown if the corps faced any penalties.

== Current Operations ==
The corps continues to staff BLS ambulances 24/7. ALS services are provided by Jersey City Medical Center. The corps also provides additional staff for special events and major emergencies, such as Hoboken's Italian Festival, major parades, and other days of expected major activity. The squad also supports and is supported by its neighbors through informal mutual aid agreements with neighboring Jersey City, Bayonne, Weehawken, and Union City.

=== Vehicles ===
The corps maintains four fully equipped BLS ambulances. Three vehicles are type III ambulances, with one type II ambulance These vehicles are rotated through for the day-to-day operations of the corps. These vehicles carry AEDs, LUCAS devices, oxygen, glucose, aspirin, naloxone, epinephrine auto injectors (more commonly known as EpiPens), bandaging and splinting supplies, and transportation equipment. The four ambulances carry the fleet numbers 921, 922, 923 and 618, however these vehicles are all marked as 134, the corps' radio call sign.

The corps also maintains a supervisor SUV, used for incident command staff as well as general corps business, several equipment trailers, two mass-casualty response units with specialized equipment for prolonged and mass-casualty incidents, a field communications truck, a golf cart with limited medical supplies, and several bicycles.

=== Communications ===
The corps uses the same frequencies as the Hoboken Police Department for their primary dispatch, however are also able to use their "D1" frequency for internal communications, contacting mutual aid, and for primary dispatch at major emergencies or incidents where the standard police frequency is congested with police traffic. To support major incidents, the corps' radio communication personnel are able to use the Field Communications bus or work with the city Emergency Operations Center to coordinate local Police, EMS, and Fire as well as outside agencies who may be responding to a major incident.

=== Special Operations ===
The corps provides a response to all fires and other major emergencies, including on-scene triage and multiple ambulances for transport. The corps will also mobilize for events such as the Mother's Day 2011 PATH train crash, the "Miracle on the Hudson", when a US Airways flight crash-landed into the Hudson River, the city's yearly St. Patrick's day festivities, the 2016 NJ Transit train crash and operated throughout Hurricane Sandy.
