= ITD =

ITD may refer to:

- Income Tax Department, Government of India's department for direct taxes
- Idaho Transportation Department
- Impedance threshold device, a valve used in cardiopulmonary resuscitation (CPR)
- Information Technology Directorate (formerly the Information Engineering Directorate) of the United Kingdom government Department of Trade and Industry
- Inter-type declaration, a feature of Aspect-oriented computer programming.
- Interaural time difference, the difference in arrival time of a sound between two ears
- Internal tandem duplication, a form of mutation (see gene duplication and tandem exon duplication)
- Italian-Thai Development, a Thai construction company
