= Cough CPR =

1999 medical hoax

Cough CPR is the subject of a hoax email that began circulating in 1999. It is described as a "resuscitation technique" in which through prolonged coughing and deep breathing every 2 seconds, a person suffering a cardiac dysrhythmia immediately before cardiac arrest can keep conscious until help arrives (or until the person can get to the nearest hospital). Neither the American Heart Association nor the American Red Cross endorses cough CPR during a heart attack.

This confusion appears to revolve primarily over the public's failure to discriminate between a heart attack, cardiac arrest, and cardiac dysrhythmias. A heart attack occurs when an occlusion (e.g. blood clot) of an artery in the heart slowly causes tissue to die. This can result in chest pain and discomfort, and requires immediate medical attention to resolve the occlusion by emergency surgery or cardiac clot-busting drugs. A cardiac dysrhythmia is primarily an electrical problem within the heart, and is sometimes treated with electrolytes, vagal maneuver, or electrical cardioversion.

== Chain E-mails ==
Cough CPR has been the subject of a series of chain email campaigns. These emails are typically of the following format: (See Snopes for this and other citation issues.)

HOW TO SURVIVE A HEART ATTACK WHEN ALONE

Since many people are alone when they suffer a heart attack, this article seemed in order. Without help the person whose heart stops beating properly and who begins to feel Faint, has only about 10 seconds left before losing consciousness. However, these victims can help themselves by coughing repeatedly and very vigorously. A deep breath should be taken before each cough, and the cough must be deep and prolonged, as when producing sputum from deep inside the chest. A breath and a cough must be repeated about every two seconds without let up until help arrives, or until the heart is felt to be beating normally again. Deep breaths get oxygen into the lungs and coughing movements squeeze the heart and keep the blood circulating.
