= AutoPulse =

Cardiopulmonary resuscitation device

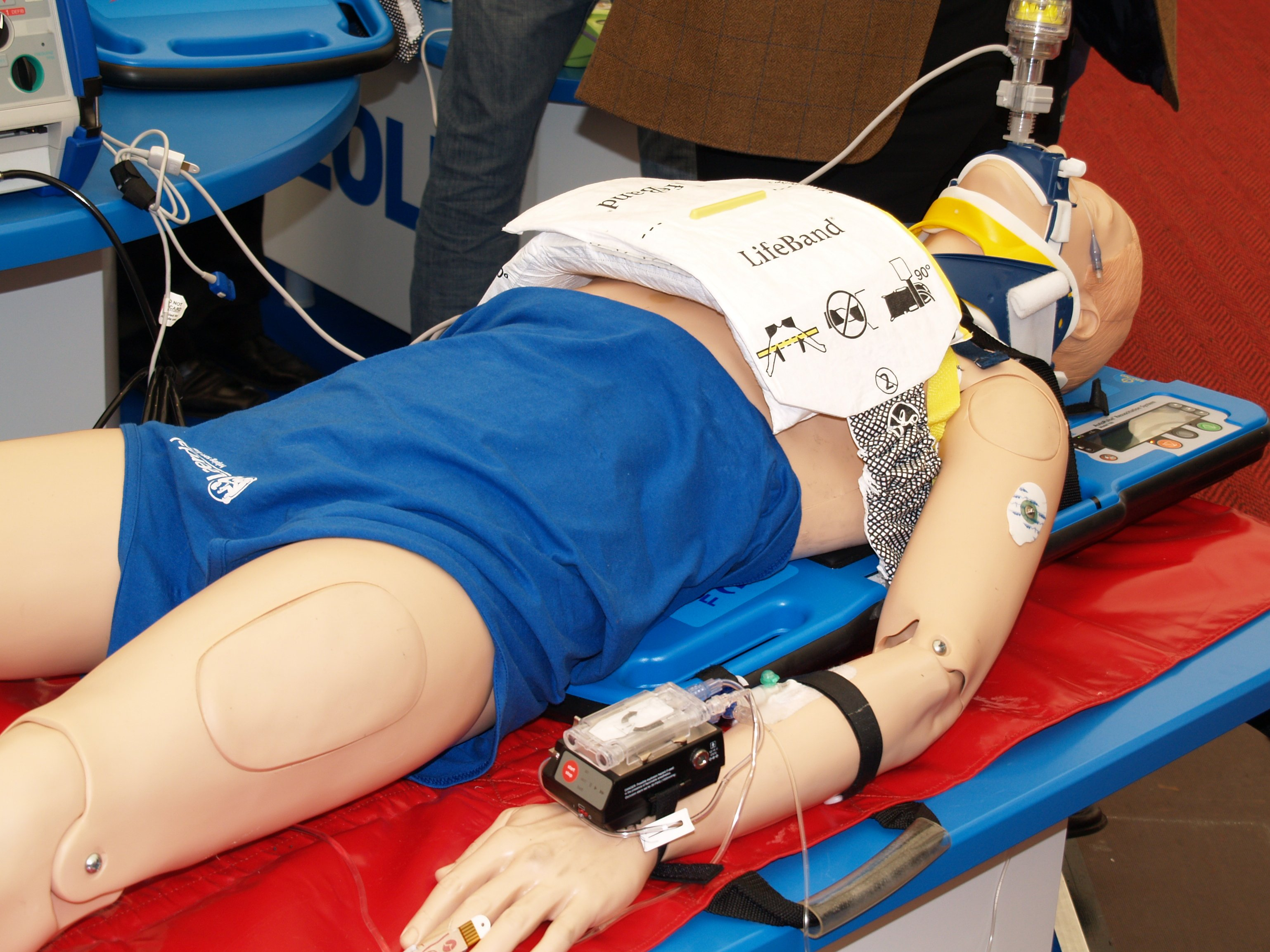
- AutoPulse on a dummy

The AutoPulse is an automated, portable, battery-powered cardiopulmonary resuscitation device created by Revivant, and subsequently purchased and currently manufactured by ZOLL Medical Corporation. It is a chest compression device composed of a constricting band and half backboard that is intended to be used as an adjunct to CPR during advanced cardiac life support by professional health care providers. The AutoPulse uses a distributing band to deliver the chest compressions. In literature it is also known as LDB-CPR (Load Distributing Band-CPR).

The AutoPulse measures chest size and resistance before it delivers the unique combination of thoracic and cardiac chest compressions. The compression depth and force varies per patient. The chest displacement equals a 20% reduction in the anterior-posterior chest depth. The physiological duty cycle is 50%, and it runs in a 30:2, 15:2 or continuous compression mode, which is user-selectable, at a rate of 80 compressions-per-minute.

== Device operation ==
The patient's head, shoulders and upper back lay upon the base unit, with the controls for the AutoPulse beside the patient's left ear. It can be augmented for cervical spinal support. The unit contains the control computer, the rechargeable battery, and the motors that operate the LifeBand. The LifeBand is an adjustable strap that covers the entire rib cage. When the patient is strapped in and the start button is pressed, the LifeBand pulls tight around the chest, determines the patient's chest size and resistance, and proceeds to rhythmically constrict the entire rib cage, pumping the heart at a rate of 80 compressions per minute. The LifeBand can be placed over defibrillation pads. The LifeBand is disposable, and designed to be used on a single patient for sanitary reasons.

== Mechanism of CPR blood flow ==
The load-distributing band system, employing thoracic compressions, produces higher blood flow compared to CPR consisting of sternal compressions only. The potential to produce blood flow for a sudden cardiac arrest victim is in large part determined by the peak power of the compression. Factors determining the power of the compression are the force of the compression, the depth of the compression, and the duration that the compression is held at maximum depth.

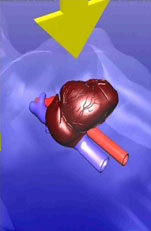
Cardiac pump - compresses mainly the heart

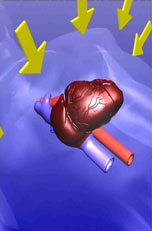
Thoracic pump - compresses the entire chest

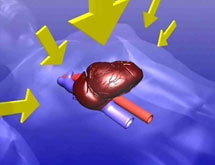
Thoracic and cardiac pump combined

== Research ==
The gold standard for resuscitation research is survival to hospital discharge. Although it may seem valuable to measure short-term and intermediate outcomes like return of spontaneous circulation (ROSC) or survival to hospital admission, anything less than neurologically intact survival and hospital discharge is ultimately irrelevant.

Several animal studies have shown that automated CPR machines are more effective at providing circulatory support than manual CPR. One study showed that use of the AutoPulse produced blood flow to the heart and brain that was comparable to pre-arrest levels. In another study, an adapted AutoPulse was shown to be highly effective in support of cardiac arrest in animals, whereas manual CPR was tenuous in its effectiveness. Pigs were used in the study, and were left in cardiac arrest for eight minutes to simulate average ambulance response time. 73% of the pigs that were put into the AutoPulse were revived, and 88% of the surviving pigs showed no neurological damage. None of the pigs that received manual CPR survived.

The Circulation Improving Resuscitation Care (CIRC) trial is the largest prospective randomized trial to date for mechanical chest compressions in out-of-hospital cardiac arrest (OHCA). The goal was to demonstrate that the AutoPulse Non-invasive Cardiac Support Pump is a safe and effective component of a system of care focusing on high-quality chest compressions. Compared to high-quality manual CPR, AutoPulse CPR resulted in statistically equivalent survival to hospital discharge and no difference in neurologic status at discharge in adults with out-of-hospital cardiac arrest of presumed cardiac etiology.

There are times when delivering high quality manual CPR isn't practical or even possible; the results of the CIRC trial confirm the important role the AutoPulse system can play in improving resuscitation outcomes.

In 2005, American Heart Association Guidelines for Cardiopulmonary Resuscitation gave load-distributing band CPR (LDB-CPR) a Class IIb recommendation. As of 2025, the American Heart Association recommends against the routine use of mechanical CPR devices, such as the AutoPulse.

Class I	Definitely recommended. Supported by excellent evidence.
Class IIa	Acceptable and useful. Good to very good evidence provides support.
Class IIb	Acceptable and useful. Fair to good evidence provides support.
Class III	Unacceptable, no documented benefit, may be harmful.

== Criticism ==
The AutoPulse has received criticism surrounding its battery life, bulk, and studies suggesting poor survival to hospital discharge. The most notable case of such issues can be found in the news reports of the resuscitation of Prince Friso after he and his companion were caught in an avalanche. In that case, the AutoPulse batteries failed after only 9 and 15 minutes.

Studies have also failed to show an increase in survival to hospital discharge. During the ASPIRE trial (the first multi-centered, randomized trial with large enrollment), the survival to hospital discharge rates decreased from 9.9% with manual CPR to approximately 5%. Because of these findings, the ethics review board terminated the study. However, some researchers question the validity of the ASPIRE protocol. The CIRC study results additionally indicate that the AutoPulse increases the time before first defibrillation and decrease the average compressions per minute in comparison with manual CPR. Overall, the study shows no improvement over high quality manual CPR.

Several cases have been reported where the AutoPulse has caused additional injury to patients receiving compressions from the device.

== See also ==
- LUCAS device
