= Cardiopulmonary resuscitation =

Emergency procedure after sudden cardiac arrest

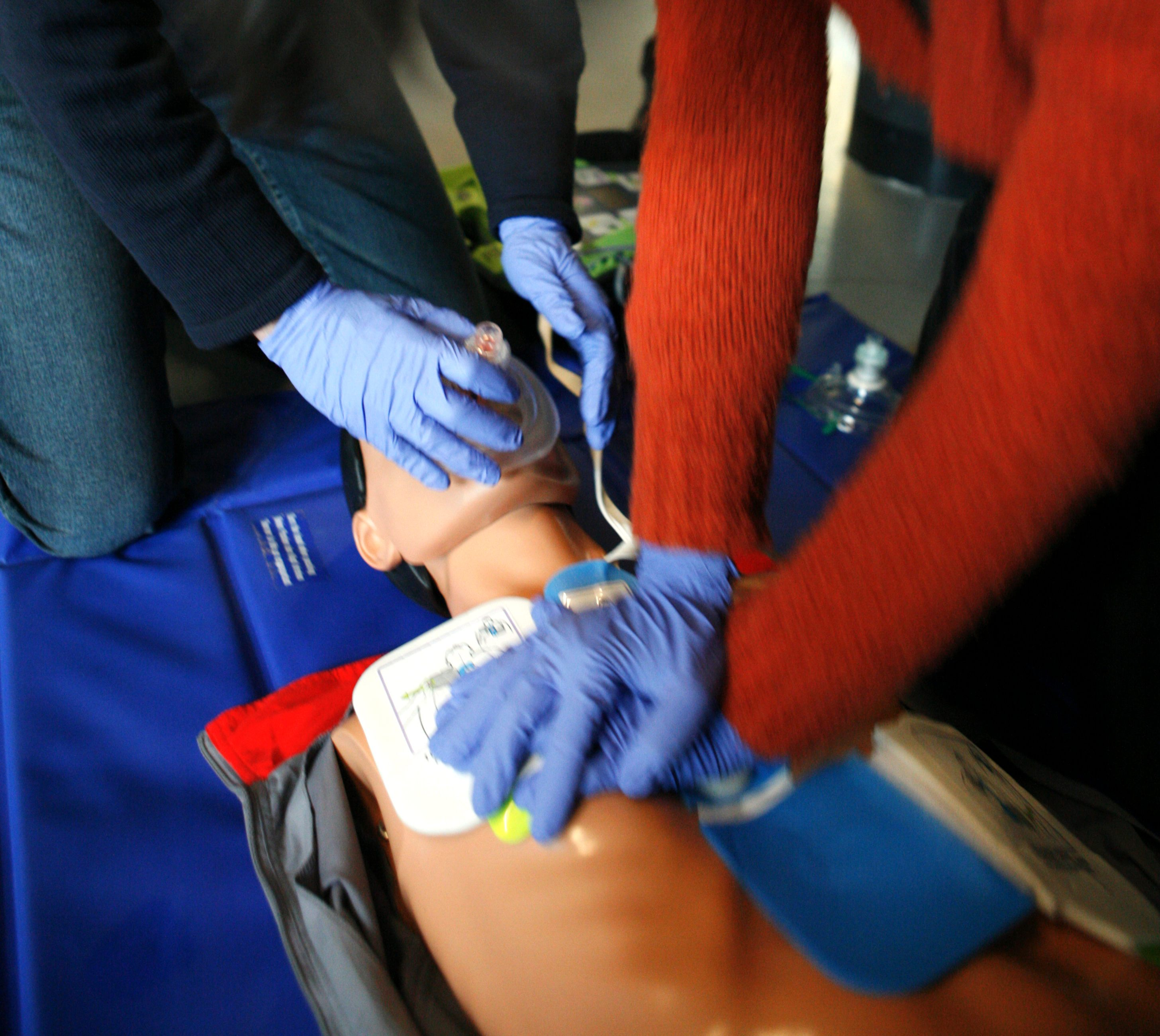
- CPR being performed on a medical-training mannequin
- Specialty: Cardiology, emergency medicine, critical care medicine
- ICD-9: 99.60
- MeSH: D016887
- OPS-301 code: 8-771
- MedlinePlus: 000010

Cardiopulmonary resuscitation (CPR) is an emergency procedure used during cardiac or respiratory arrest that involves chest compressions, often combined with artificial ventilation, to preserve brain function and maintain circulation until spontaneous breathing and heartbeat can be restored. It is recommended for those who are unresponsive with no breathing or abnormal breathing, for example, agonal respirations.

CPR involves chest compressions for adults between 5 cm (2.0 in) and 6 cm (2.4 in) deep and at a rate of at least 100 to 120 per minute. The rescuer may also provide artificial ventilation by either exhaling air into the subject's mouth or nose (mouth-to-mouth resuscitation) or using a device that pushes air into the subject's lungs (mechanical ventilation). Current recommendations emphasize early and high-quality chest compressions over artificial ventilation; a simplified CPR method involving only chest compressions is recommended for untrained rescuers. With children, however, 2015 American Heart Association guidelines indicate that doing only compressions may result in worse outcomes, because such problems in children normally arise from respiratory issues rather than from cardiac ones, given their young age. Chest compression to breathing ratios are set at 30 to 2 in adults.

CPR alone is unlikely to restart the heart. Its main purpose is to restore the partial flow of oxygenated blood to the brain and heart. The objective is to delay tissue death and to extend the brief window of opportunity for a successful resuscitation without permanent brain damage. Administration of an electric shock to the subject's heart, termed defibrillation, is usually needed to restore a viable, or "perfusing", heart rhythm. Defibrillation is effective only for certain heart rhythms, namely ventricular fibrillation or pulseless ventricular tachycardia, rather than asystole or pulseless electrical activity, which usually requires the treatment of underlying conditions to restore cardiac function. Early shock, when appropriate, is recommended. CPR may succeed in inducing a heart rhythm that may be shockable. In general, CPR is continued until the person has a return of spontaneous circulation (ROSC) or is declared dead.

Welsh Government training video of how to perform CPR on a person in cardiac arrest.

== Medical uses ==
CPR is indicated for any person unresponsive with no breathing or breathing only in occasional agonal gasps, as it is most likely that they are in cardiac arrest. If a person still has a pulse but is not breathing (respiratory arrest), artificial ventilations may be more appropriate, but due to the difficulty people have in accurately assessing the presence or absence of a pulse, CPR guidelines recommend that lay persons should not be instructed to check the pulse while giving healthcare professionals the option to check a pulse. In those with cardiac arrest due to trauma, CPR is considered futile but still recommended. Correcting the underlying cause such as a tension pneumothorax or pericardial tamponade may help.

== Pathophysiology ==
CPR is used on people in cardiac arrest to oxygenate the blood and maintain a cardiac output to keep vital organs alive. Blood circulation and oxygenation are required to transport oxygen to the tissues. The physiology of CPR involves generating a pressure gradient between the arterial and venous vascular beds; CPR achieves this via multiple mechanisms.

The brain may sustain damage after blood flow has been stopped for about four minutes and irreversible damage after about seven minutes. Typically if blood flow ceases for one to two hours, then body cells die. Therefore, in general, CPR is effective only if performed within seven minutes of the stoppage of blood flow. The heart also rapidly loses the ability to maintain a normal rhythm. Low body temperatures, as sometimes seen in near-drownings, prolong the time the brain survives.

Following cardiac arrest, effective CPR enables enough oxygen to reach the brain to delay brain stem death and allows the heart to remain responsive to defibrillation attempts. If an incorrect compression rate is used during CPR, going against standing American Heart Association (AHA) guidelines of 100–120 compressions per minute, this can cause a net decrease in venous return of blood, for what is required, to fill the heart. For example, if a compression rate of above 120 compressions per minute is used consistently throughout the entire CPR process, this error could adversely affect survival rates and outcomes for the victim.

== Order of CPR in a first aid sequence ==
The best position for CPR maneuvers in the sequence of first aid reactions to a cardiac arrest is a question that has been long studied.

As a general reference, the recommended order (according to the guidelines of many related associations such as AHA and Red Cross) is:

1. Asking for help from bystanders in case any of them have received first aid training or can perform additional tasks.
  - Variation: when the rescuer is alone and no phone is nearby, the rescuer would go first for a phone to call for emergency medical services (only if the rescuer can return in very few minutes to apply CPR maneuvers to the patient, or emergency medical services will be with the patient in a few minutes).
2. Calling by phone for emergency medical services. Also, go for an automated defibrillator (AED), but only if the AED is available within a few minutes.
3. Attempting defibrillation with the automated external defibrillator (AED), because it is easy to use if it has been found. If not, or until it has arrived, attempting CPR maneuvers as the latest step of those possible ones.

If there are multiple rescuers, these tasks can be distributed and performed simultaneously to save time.

=== Exception to the main sequence ===
- If a rescuer is completely alone with a victim of drowning, or with a child who was already unconscious when the rescuer arrived, the rescuer should:
1. First perform two minutes of CPR maneuvers.
  - Variation: when the lone rescuer does not have a phone, it is recommended to perform about two minutes of CPR maneuvers, and then go for a phone to call for emergency medical services (only if the rescuer can return in very few minutes to continue the CPR maneuvers, or emergency medical services will be with the patient in a few minutes).
2. Call by phone for emergency medical services. Also, go for an automated defibrillator (AED), but only if the AED is available within a few minutes.
3. Attempt defibrillation with the automated external defibrillator (AED), because it is easy to use if it has been found. If not, or until it has arrived, attempt CPR maneuvers as the latest step of those possible ones.

The reason is that CPR ventilation (rescue breaths) is considered the most important action for those victims. Cardiac arrest in drowning victims originates from a lack of oxygen, and a child would probably not suffer from cardiac diseases.

== Methods ==
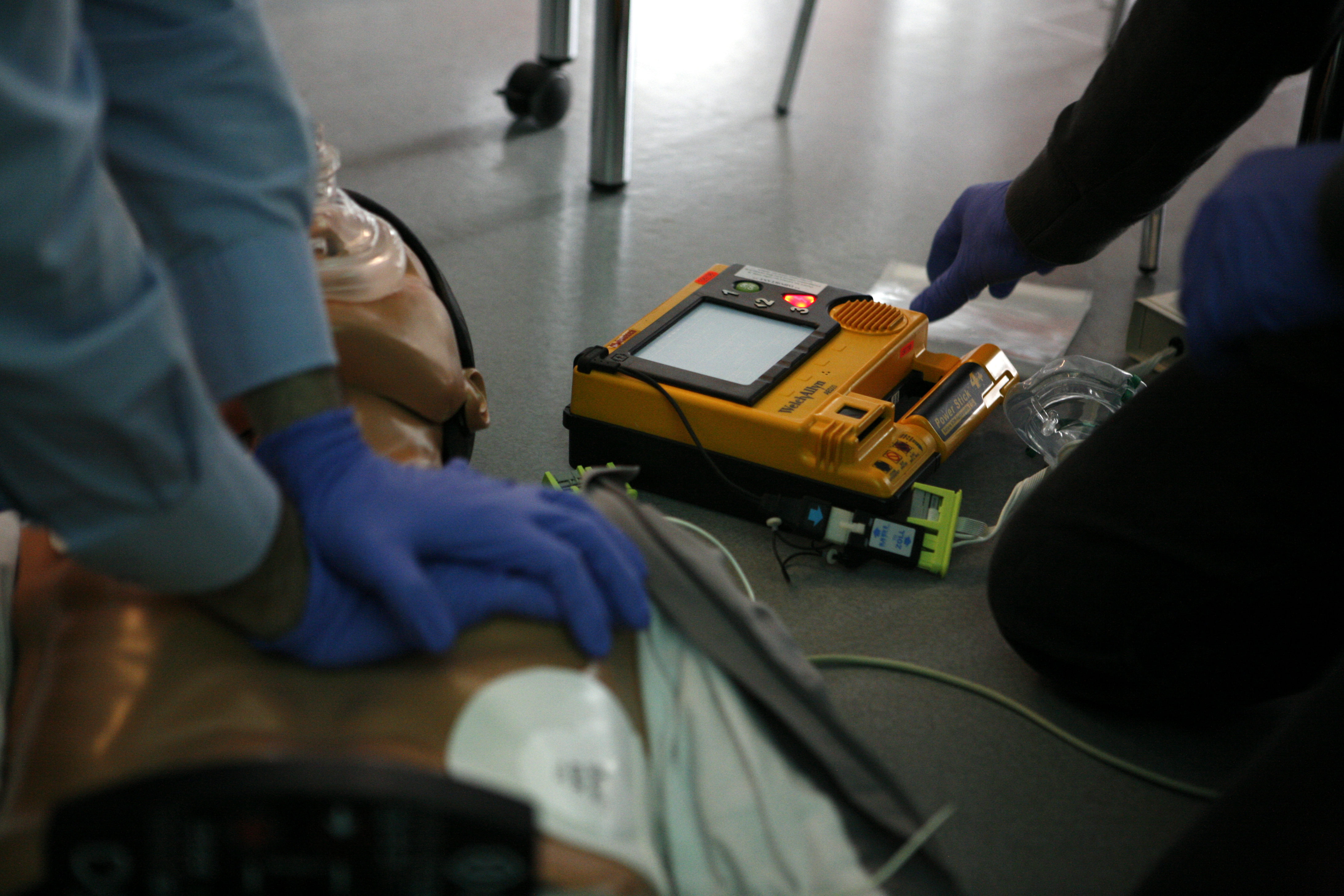
CPR training: CPR is being administered while a second rescuer prepares for defibrillation.

In 2010, the AHA and International Liaison Committee on Resuscitation updated their CPR guidelines. The importance of high quality CPR (sufficient rate and depth without excessively ventilating) was emphasized. The order of interventions was changed for all age groups except newborns from airway, breathing, chest compressions (ABC) to chest compressions, airway, breathing (CAB). An exception to this recommendation is for those believed to be in a respiratory arrest (airway obstruction, drug overdose, etc.).

The most important aspects of CPR are: few interruptions of chest compressions, sufficient speed and depth of compressions, completely relaxing pressure between compressions, and not ventilating too much. It is unclear if a few minutes of CPR before defibrillation results in different outcomes than immediate defibrillation.

=== Compressions with rescue breaths ===
A normal CPR procedure uses chest compressions and ventilations (rescue breaths, usually mouth-to-mouth) for any victim of cardiac arrest, who would be unresponsive (usually unconscious or approximately unconscious), not breathing, or only gasping because of the lack of heartbeats. But the ventilations could be omitted for untrained rescuers aiding adults who suffer a cardiac arrest (if it is not an asphyxial cardiac arrest, as by drowning, which needs ventilations). There has been evidence of increased effectiveness of CPR when the time between bouts of 30 compressions is limited.

Chest compressions performed at 100 per minute (proper rhythm)

The patient's head is commonly tilted back (a head-tilt and chin-lift position) for improving the airflow if ventilations can be used. However, when a patient seems to have a possible serious injury in the spinal cord, the head must not be moved except if completely necessary, and always very carefully to prevent further damage to the patient's future mobility. In the case of babies, the head is left straight, looking forward, which is necessary for the ventilations, because of the size of the baby's neck.

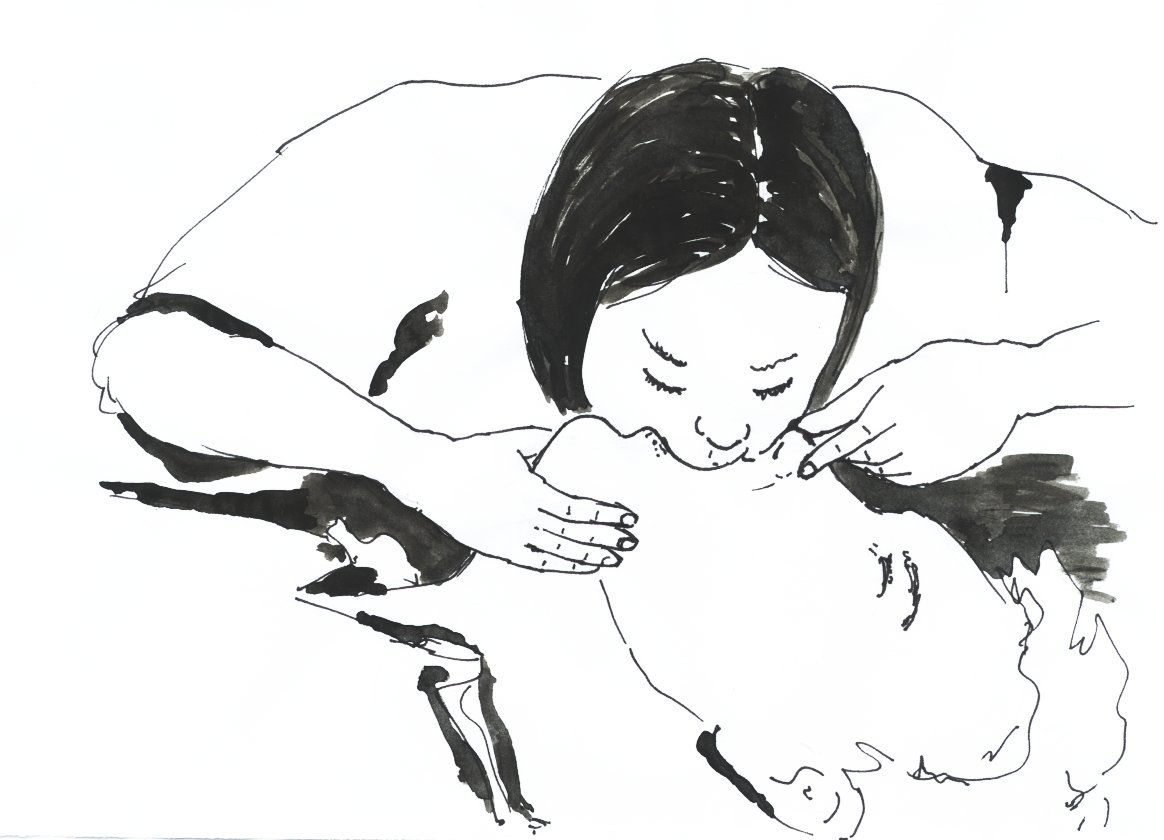
Mouth-to-mouth ventilations (mouth-to-mouth rescue breaths)

In CPR, the chest compressions push on the lower half of the sternum —the bone that is along the middle of the chest from the neck to the belly— and leave it to rise up until recovering its normal position. The rescue breaths are made by pinching the victim's nose and blowing air mouth-to-mouth. This fills the lungs, which makes the chest rise up, and increases the pressure into the thoracic cavity. If the victim is a baby, the rescuer would compress the chest with only 2 fingers and would make the ventilations using their own mouth to cover the baby's mouth and nose at the same time. The recommended compression-to-ventilation ratio, for all victims of any age, is 30:2 (a cycle that alternates continually 30 rhythmic chest compressions series and 2 rescue breaths series). Victims of drowning receive an initial series of 2 rescue breaths before that cycle begins.

As an exception for the normal compression-to-ventilation ratio of 30:2, if at least two trained rescuers are present and the victim is a child, the preferred ratio is 15:2. Equally, in newborns, the ratio is 30:2 if one rescuer is present, and 15:2 if two rescuers are present (according to the AHA 2015 Guidelines). In an advanced airway treatment, such as an endotracheal tube or laryngeal mask airway, the artificial ventilation should occur without pauses in compressions at a rate of 1 breath every 6 to 8 seconds (8–10 ventilations per minute).

In all victims, the compression speed is at least 100 compressions per minute. Recommended compression depth in adults and children is of 5 cm (2 inches), and in infants it is 4 cm (1.6 inches). In adults, rescuers should use two hands for the chest compressions (one on top of the other), while in children one hand could be enough (or two, adapting the compressions to the child's constitution), and with babies the rescuer must use only two fingers.

There exist some plastic shields and respirators that can be used in the rescue breaths between the mouths of the rescuer and the victim, with the purposes of sealing a better vacuum and avoiding infections.

In some cases, the problem is one of the failures in the rhythm of the heart (ventricular fibrillation and ventricular tachycardia) that can be corrected with the electric shock of a defibrillator. So, if a victim is suffering a cardiac arrest, it is important that someone asks for a defibrillator nearby, to try with it a defibrillation process when the victim is already unconscious. The common model of a defibrillator (the AED) is an automatic portable machine that guides the user with recorded voice instructions along the process, analyzes the victim, and applies the correct shocks if they are needed.

The time in which a cardiopulmonary resuscitation can still work is unclear, and it depends on many factors. Many official guides recommend continuing cardiopulmonary resuscitation until emergency medical services arrive (for trying to keep the patient alive, at least). The same guides also indicate asking for any emergency defibrillator (AED) near, to try an automatic defibrillation as soon as possible before considering that the patient has died.

A normal cardiopulmonary resuscitation has a recommended order named 'CAB': first 'Chest' (chest compressions), followed by 'Airway' (attempt to open the airway by performing a head tilt and a chin lift), and 'Breathing' (rescue breaths). As of 2010, the Resuscitation Council (UK) was still recommending an 'ABC' order, with the 'C' standing for 'Circulation' (check for a pulse), if the victim is a child. It can be difficult to determine the presence or absence of a pulse, so the pulse check has been removed for common providers and should not be performed for more than 10 seconds by healthcare providers.

=== Compression only ===
For untrained rescuers helping adult victims of cardiac arrest, it is recommended to perform compression-only CPR (chest compressions hands-only or cardiocerebral resuscitation, without artificial ventilation), as it is easier to perform and instructions are easier to give over a phone. In adults with out-of-hospital cardiac arrest, compression-only CPR by the average person has an equal or higher success rate than standard CPR.

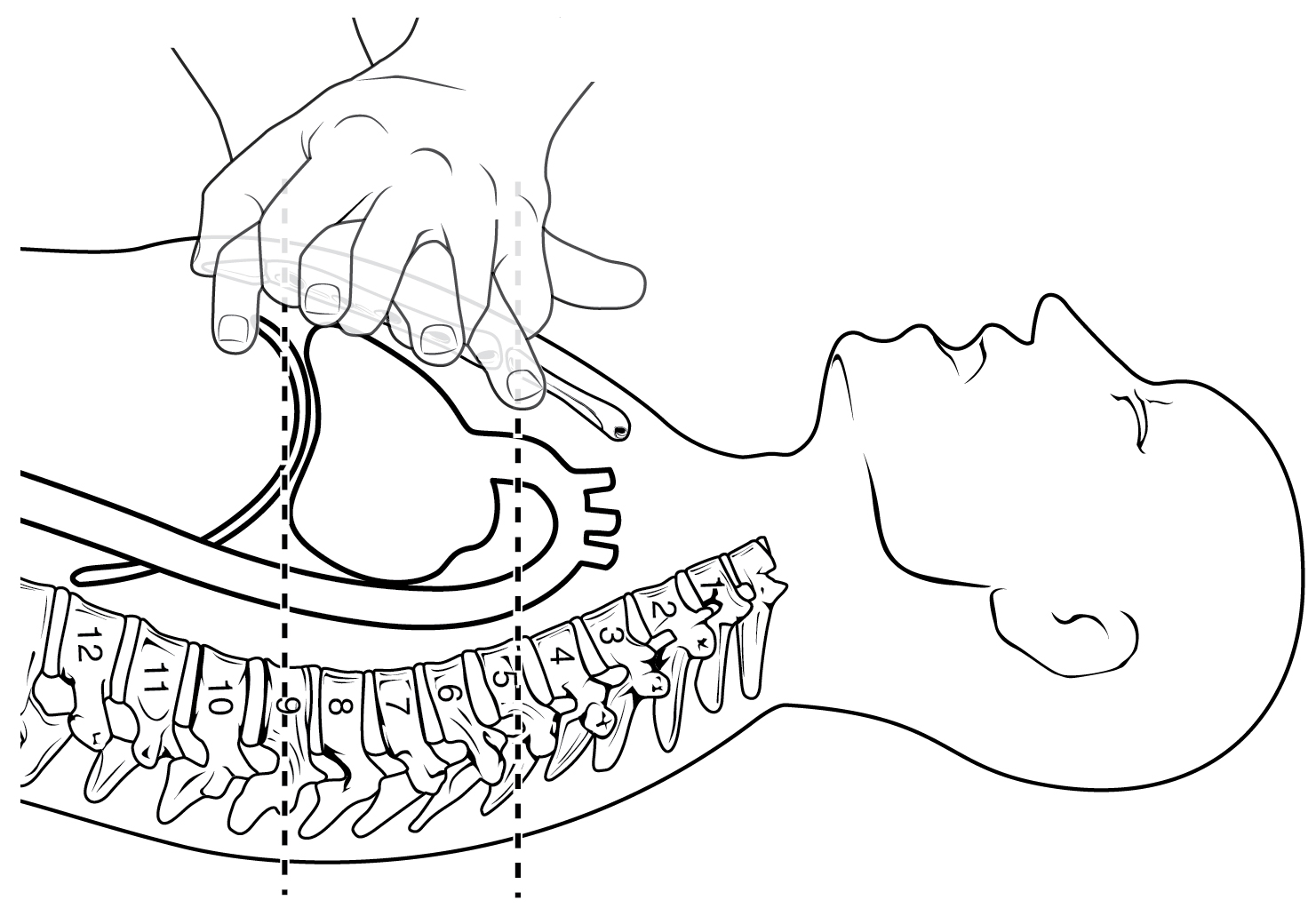
CPR technique as demonstrated on a dummy

The CPR 'compressions only' procedure consists only of chest compressions that push on the lower half of the bone that is in the middle of the chest (the sternum).

Compression-only CPR is not as good for children who are more likely to have cardiac arrest from respiratory causes. Two reviews have found that compression-only CPR had no more success than no CPR whatsoever. Rescue breaths for children and especially for babies should be relatively gentle. Either a ratio of compressions to breaths of 30:2 or 15:2 was found to have better results for children. Both children and adults should receive 100 chest compressions per minute. Other exceptions besides children include cases of drownings and drug overdose; in both these cases, compressions, and rescue breaths are recommended if the bystander is trained and is willing to do so.

As per the AHA, the beat of the Bee Gees song "Stayin' Alive" provides an ideal rhythm in terms of beats per minute to use for hands-only CPR, which is 104 beats-per-minute. One can also hum Queen's "Another One Bites the Dust", which is 110 beats-per-minute and contains a repeating drum pattern. For those in cardiac arrest due to non-heart related causes and in people less than 20 years of age, standard CPR is superior to compression-only CPR.

=== Prone CPR ===
Supine and prone positions

Standard CPR is performed with the victim in supine position. Prone CPR, or reverse CPR, is performed on a victim in prone position, lying on the chest. This is achieved by turning the head to the side and compressing the back. Due to the head being turned, the risk of vomiting and complications caused by aspiration pneumonia may be reduced.

The American Heart Association's current guidelines recommend performing CPR in the supine position and limiting prone CPR to situations where the patient cannot be turned.

=== Other ===
Interposed abdominal compressions may be beneficial in the hospital environment. There is no evidence of benefit pre-hospital or in children.

Cooling during CPR is being studied as currently, results are unclear whether or not it improves outcomes.

Internal cardiac massage is the manual squeezing of the exposed heart itself carried out through a surgical incision into the chest cavity, usually when the chest is already open for cardiac surgery.

Active compression-decompression methods using mechanical decompression of the chest have not been shown to improve outcomes in cardiac arrest.

== Use of devices ==
=== Defibrillators ===
A defibrillator is a machine that produces defibrillation: electric shocks that can restore the normal heart function of the victim. The common model of a defibrillator out of a hospital is the automated external defibrillator (AED), a portable device that is especially easy to use because it produces recorded voice instructions.

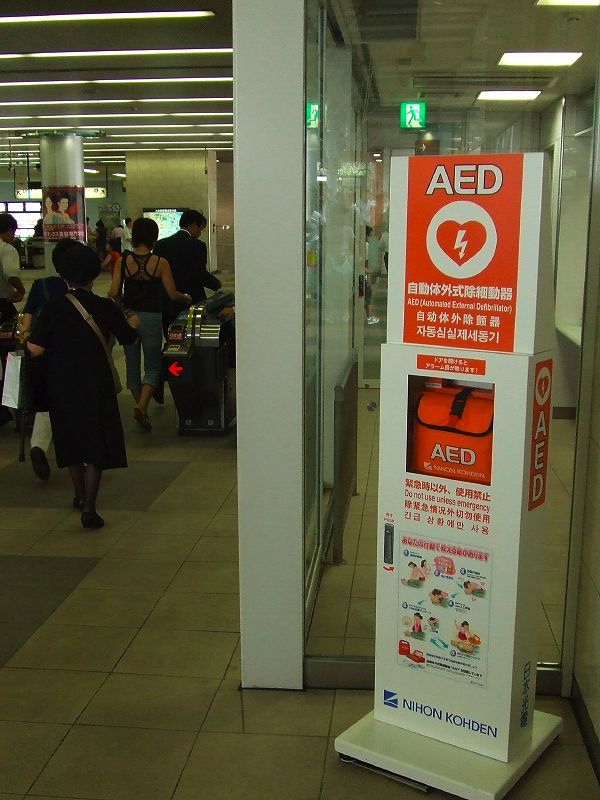
A briefcase with a public defibrillator, at a station. Its universal symbol appears above.

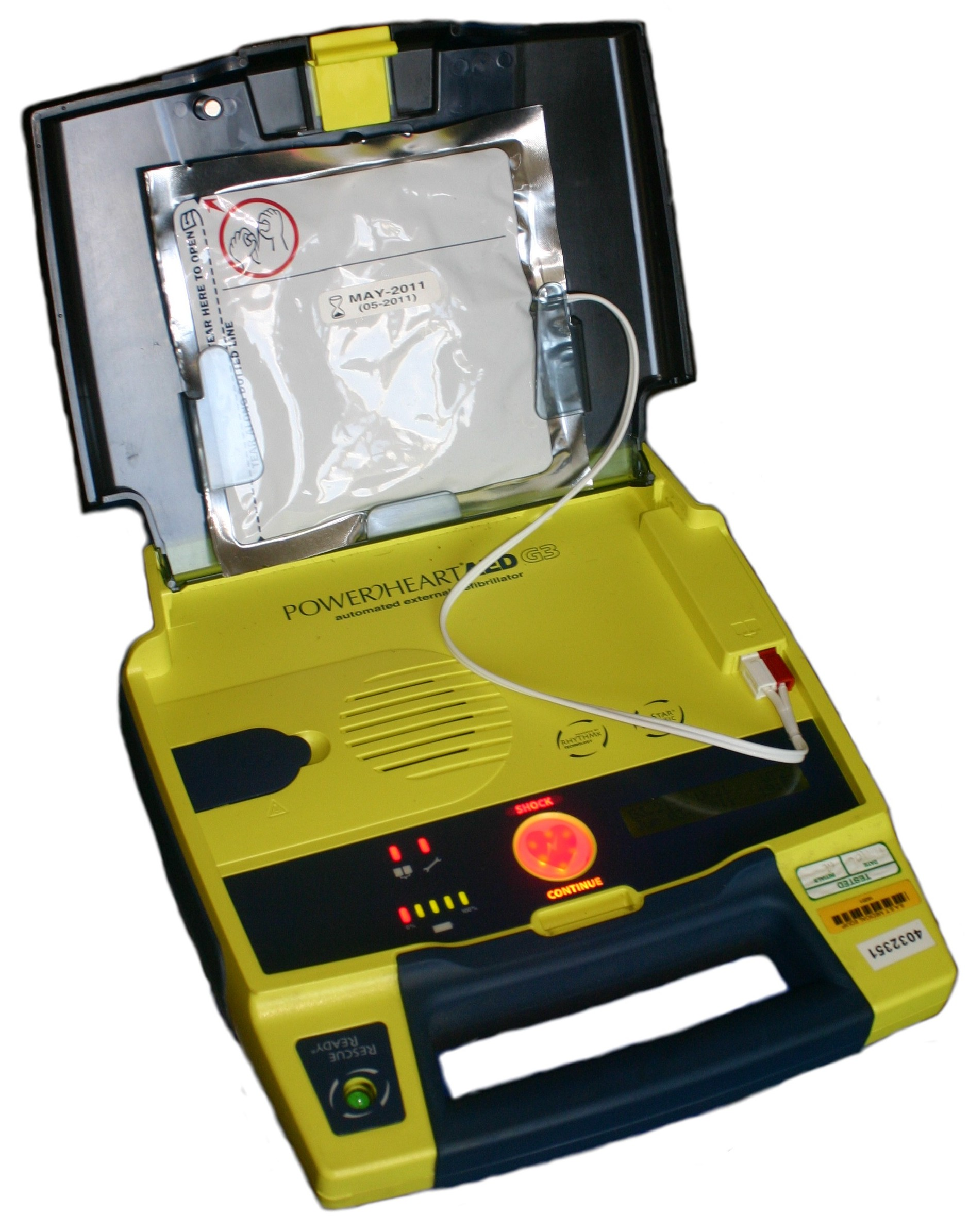
Automated defibrillator (AED)

Defibrillation is only indicated for some arrhythmias (abnormal heart beatings), specifically ventricular fibrillation (VF) and pulseless ventricular tachycardia (VT). Defibrillation is not indicated if the patient has a normal pulse or is still conscious. Also, it is not indicated in asystole or pulseless electrical activity (PEA), in those cases a normal CPR would be used to oxygenate the brain until the heart function can be restored. Improperly given electrical shocks can cause dangerous arrhythmias, such as the ventricular fibrillation (VF).

AEDs are generally advised to be applied by the public, when available, to any patient in cardiac arrest. The machine itself is able to analyse the heart rhythm, so will be able to advise whether a shock is necessary for the patient. However, CPR should not be halted in order to find a defibrillator.

Order of defibrillation in a first aid sequence

It is recommended to call for emergency medical services before a defibrillation. Afterward, a nearby AED defibrillator should be used on the patient as soon as possible. As a general reference, defibrillation is preferred to performing CPR, but only if the AED can be retrieved in a short period of time. All these tasks (calling by phone, getting an AED, and the chest compressions and rescue breaths maneuvers of CPR) can be distributed between many rescuers who make them simultaneously. The defibrillator itself would indicate if more CPR maneuvers are required.

As a slight variation for that sequence, if the rescuer is completely alone with a victim of drowning, or with a child who was already unconscious when the rescuer arrived, the rescuer would do the CPR maneuvers during 2 minutes (approximately 5 cycles of ventilations and compressions); after that, the rescuer would call to emergency medical services, and then it could be tried a search for a defibrillator nearby (the CPR maneuvers are supposed to be the priority for the drowned and most of the already collapsed children).

As another possible variation, if a rescuer is completely alone and without a phone nearby, and is aiding any other victim (not a victim of drowning, nor an already unconscious child), the rescuer would go to call by phone first. After the call, the rescuer would get a nearby defibrillator and use it, or continue the CPR (the phone call and the defibrillator are considered urgent when the problem has a cardiac origin).

Defibrillation

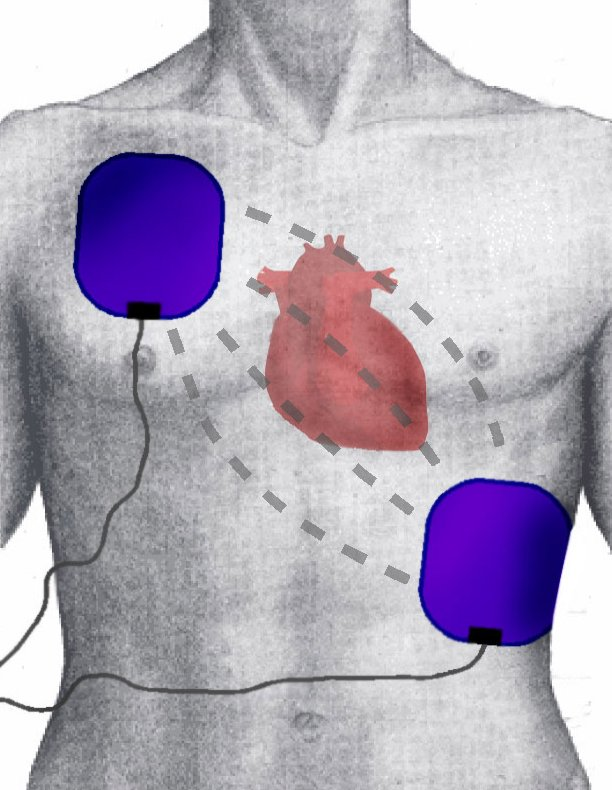
Defibrillation: position of the electrodes of a defibrillator on the human body

The standard defibrillation device, prepared for fast use out of the medical centers, is the automated external defibrillator (AED), a portable machine of small size (similar to a briefcase) that can be used by any user with no previous training. That machine produces recorded voice instructions that guide the user along the defibrillation process. It also checks the victim's condition to automatically apply electric shocks at the correct level, if they are needed. Other models are semi-automatic and require the user to push a button before an electric shock.

A defibrillator may ask for applying CPR maneuvers, so the patient would be placed lying in a face-up position. Additionally, the patient's head would be tilted back, except in the case of babies.

Water and metals transmit the electric current. This depends on the amount of water, but it is convenient to avoid starting the defibrillation on a floor with puddles and to dry the wet areas of the patient before (fast, even with any cloth, if that is enough). It is not necessary to remove the patient's jewels or piercings, but it should be avoided placing the patches of the defibrillator directly on top of them. The patches with electrodes are put on the positions that appear at the right. In very small bodies: children between 1 and 8 years, and, in general, similar bodies up to 25 kg approximately, it is recommended the use of children's size patches with reduced electric doses. If that is not possible, sizes and doses for adults would be used, and, if the patches were too big, one would be placed on the chest and the other on the back (no matter which of them).

There are several devices for improving CPR, but only defibrillators (as of 2010) have been found better than standard CPR for an out-of-hospital cardiac arrest.

When a defibrillator has been used, it should remain attached to the patient until emergency services arrive.

=== Devices for timing CPR ===
Timing devices can feature a metronome (an item carried by many ambulance crews) to assist the rescuer in achieving the correct rate. Some units can also give timing reminders for performing compressions, ventilating, and changing operators.

=== Devices for assisting in manual CPR ===
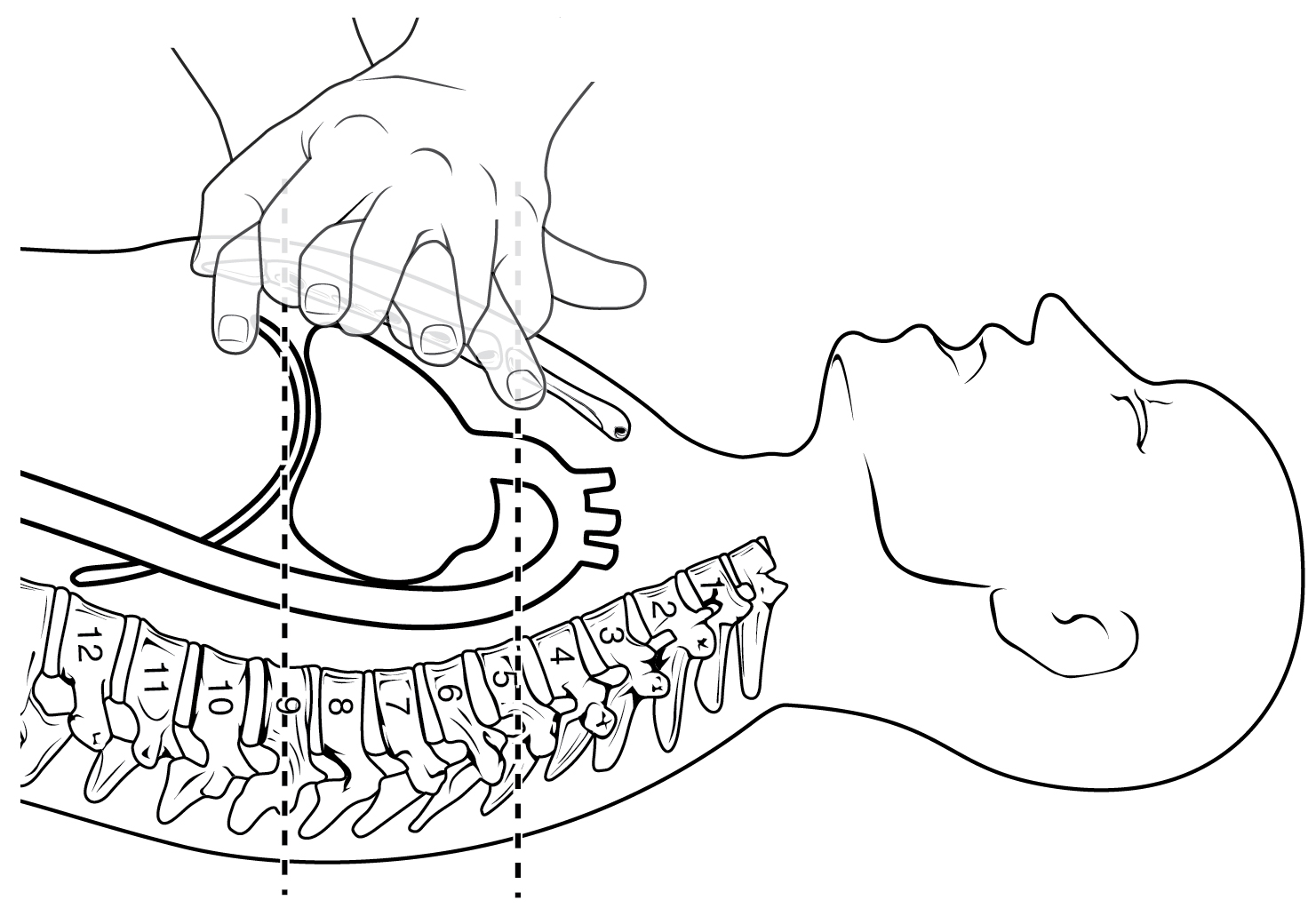
The ejection of blood from the heart is conditioned by the compression of the sternum by a third of the height of the chest.

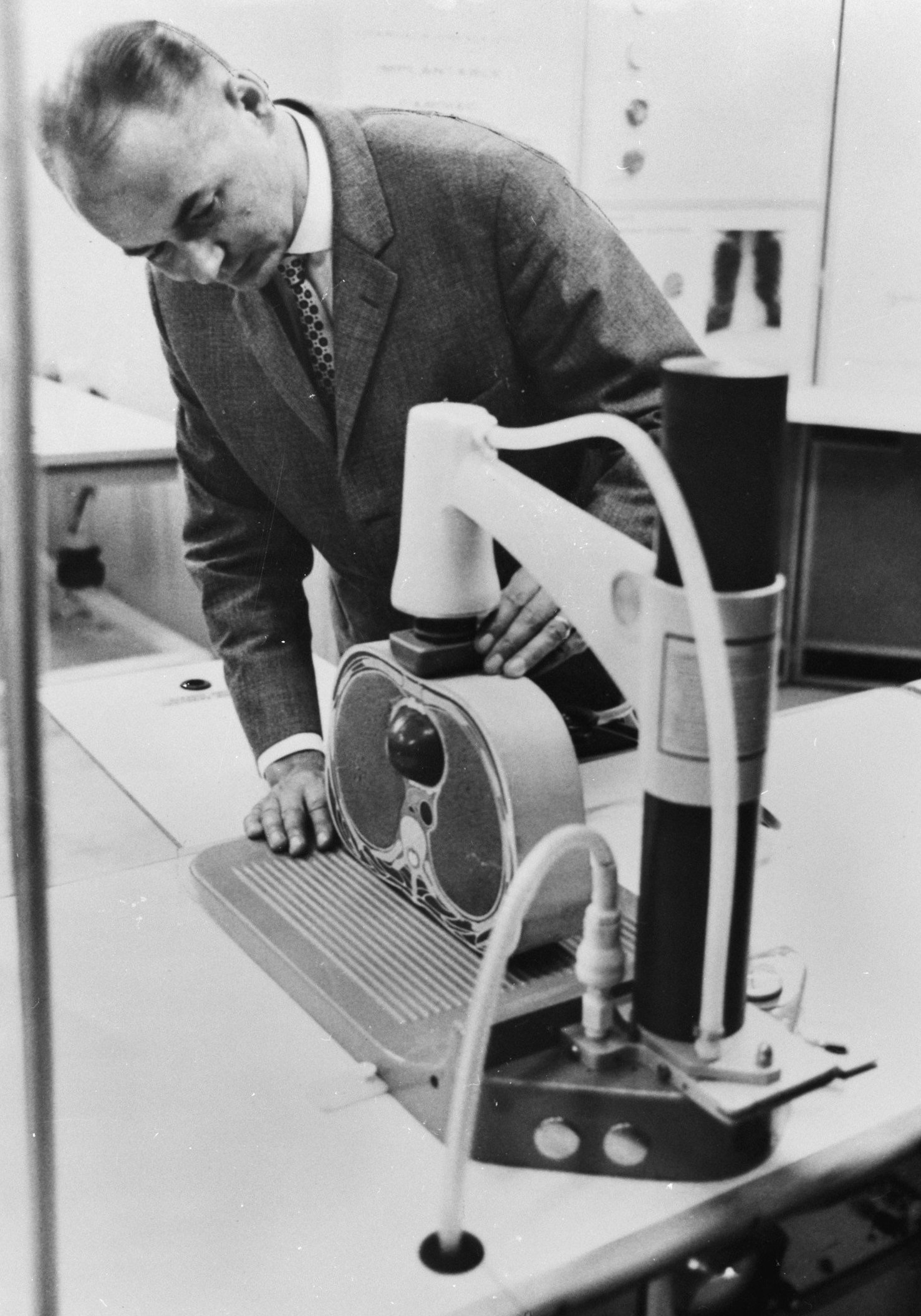
Demonstrating a mechanical heart massage device, Vienna, 1967

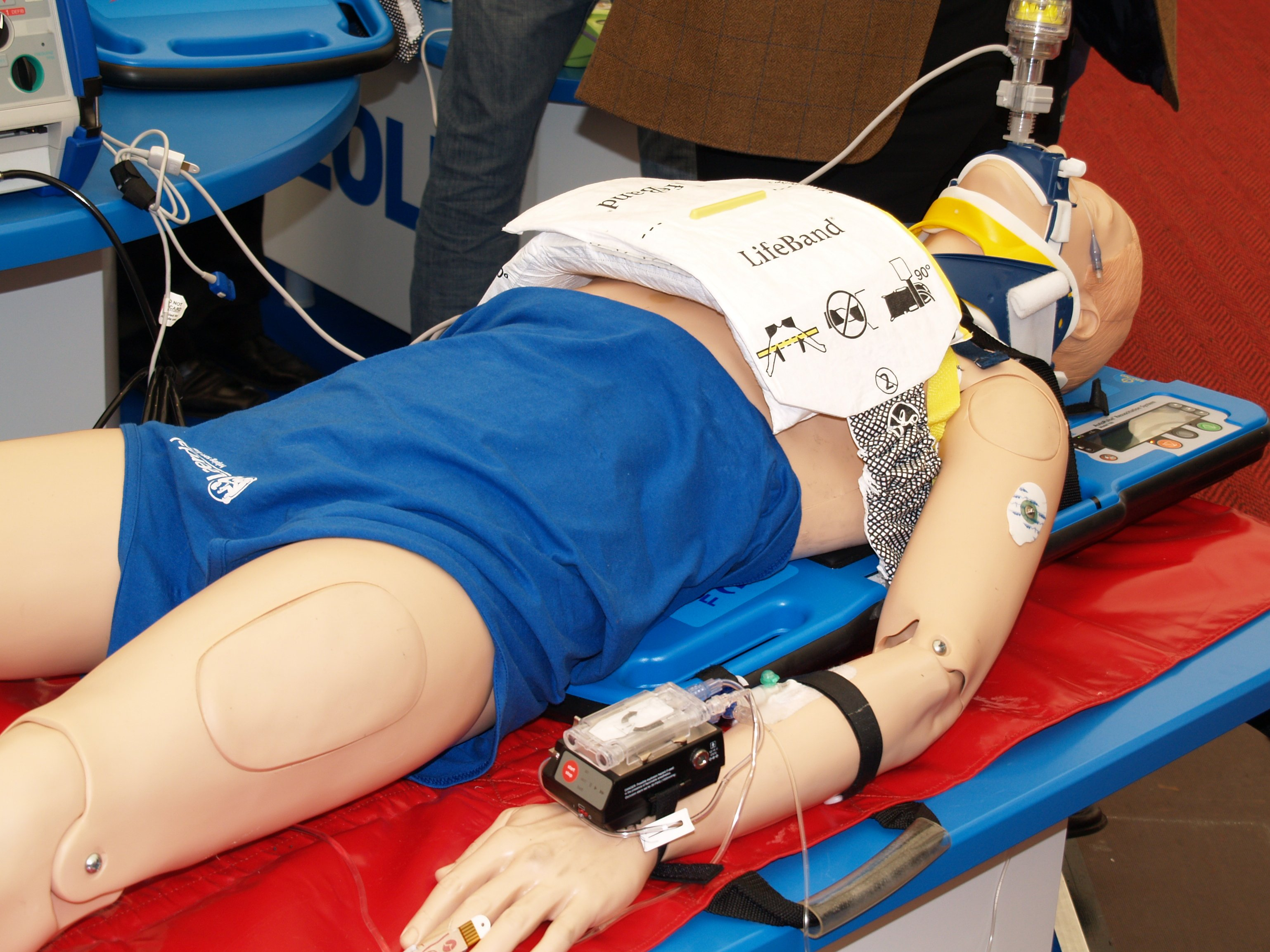
AutoPulse

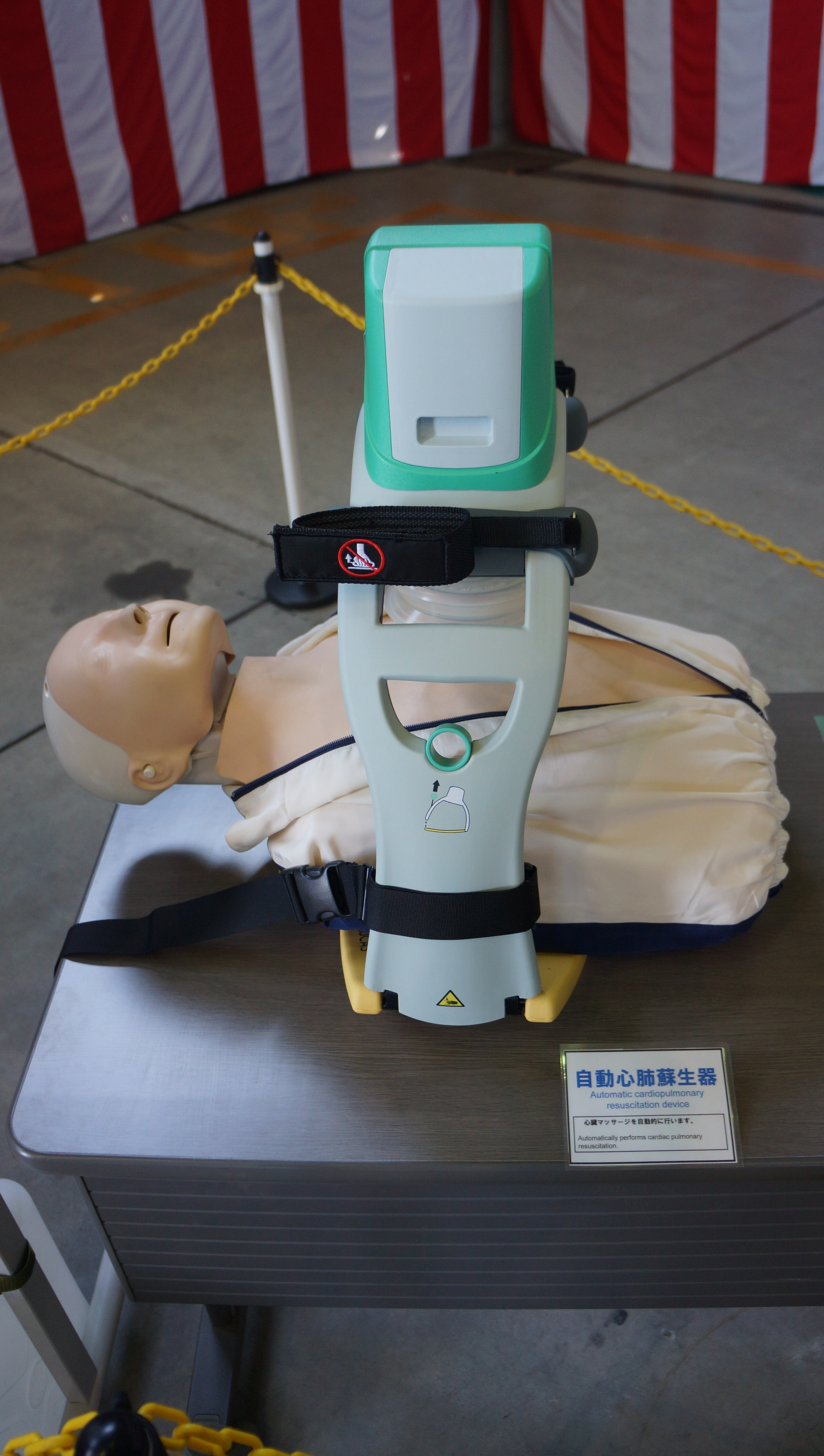
LUCAS

Mechanical chest compression devices are not better than standard manual compressions. Their use is reasonable in situations where manual compressions are not safe to perform, such as in a moving vehicle.

Audible and visual prompting may improve the quality of CPR and prevent the decrease of compression rate and depth that naturally occurs with fatigue, and to address this potential improvement, a number of devices have been developed to help improve CPR technique.

These items can be devices to be placed on top of the chest, with the rescuer's hands going over the device, and a display or audio feedback giving information on depth, force or rate, or in a wearable format such as a glove. Several published evaluations show that these devices can improve the performance of chest compressions.

As well as its use during actual CPR on a cardiac arrest victim, which relies on the rescuer carrying the device with them, these devices can also be used as part of training programs to improve basic skills in performing correct chest compressions.

=== Devices for providing automatic CPR ===
Mechanical CPR has not seen as much use as mechanical ventilation; however, use in the prehospital setting is increasing. Devices on the market include the LUCAS device, developed at the University Hospital of Lund, and AutoPulse. Both use straps around the chest to secure the patient. The first generation of the LUCAS uses a gas-driven piston and motor-driven constricting band, while later versions are battery-operated.

There are several advantages to automated devices: they allow rescuers to focus on performing other interventions; they do not fatigue and begin to perform less effective compressions, as humans do; they can perform effective compressions in limited-space environments such as air ambulances, where manual compressions are difficult, and they allow ambulance workers to be strapped in safely rather than standing over a patient in a speeding vehicle. However the disadvantages are cost to purchase, time to train emergency personnel to use them, interruption to CPR to implement, potential for incorrect application and the need for multiple device sizes.

Several studies have shown little or no improvement in survival rates but acknowledge the need for more study.

=== Mobile apps for providing CPR instructions ===
To support training and incident management, mobile apps have been published in the largest app markets. An evaluation of 61 available apps has revealed that a large number do not follow international guidelines for basic life support and many apps are not designed in a user-friendly way. As a result, the Red Cross updated and endorsed its emergency preparedness application, which uses pictures, text, and videos to assist the user. The UK Resuscitation Council has an app, called Lifesaver, which shows how to perform CPR.

== Effectivity rate ==
CPR oxygenates the body and brain, which favors making a later defibrillation and the advanced life support. Even in the case of a "non-shockable" rhythm, such as pulseless electrical activity (PEA) where defibrillation is not indicated, effective CPR is no less important. Used alone, CPR will result in few complete recoveries, though the outcome without CPR is almost uniformly fatal.

Studies have shown that immediate CPR followed by defibrillation within 3–5 minutes of sudden VF cardiac arrest dramatically improves survival. In cities such as Seattle where CPR training is widespread and defibrillation by EMS personnel follows quickly, the survival rate is about 20 percent for all causes and as high as 57 percent for a witnessed "shockable" arrest. In cities such as New York, without those advantages, the survival rate is only 5 percent for witnessed shockable arrest. Similarly, in-hospital CPR is more successful when arrests are witnessed, occur in the ICU, or occur in patients wearing heart monitors.

Adults' outcomes after CPR
	CPR in US hospitals		US, CPR outside hospitals			
	Total in hospitals	Source	CPR where an AED was used by a bystander*	All witnessed arrests with CPR, with or without bystander AED	Unwitnessed arrest with CPR	Total outside hospitals
Return of spontaneous circulation (ROSC):
2018			49%	41.9%	20.6%	31.3%
Survival to hospital discharge:
2018			35%	16.2%	4.4%	10.4%
2017	25.6%	page e381, e390, 2019 AHA	33%	16.4%	4.6%	10.4%
2016	26.4%	p.e365, 2018 AHA	32%	17.0%	4.7%	10.8%
2015	23.8%	page e471, 2017 AHA	32%	16.7%	4.6%	10.6%
2014	24.8%	page e270, 2016 AHA	32%	16.7%	4.9%	10.8%
2013				16.8%	4.7%	10.8%
2012						
2011	22.7%	p. 499, 2014 AHA				
2010						
2009	18.6%	p. 12, Girotra supplement				
2008	19.4%					

* AED data here exclude health facilities and nursing homes, where patients are sicker than average.

In adults compression-only CPR by bystanders appears to be better than chest compressions with rescue breathing. Compression-only CPR may be less effective in children than in adults, as cardiac arrest in children is more likely to have a non-cardiac cause. In a 2010 prospective study of cardiac arrest in children (age 1–17) for arrests with a non-cardiac cause, provision by bystanders of conventional CPR with rescue breathing yielded a favorable neurological outcome at one month more often than did compression-only CPR (OR 5.54). For arrests with a cardiac cause in this cohort, there was no difference between the two techniques (OR 1.20). This is consistent with American Heart Association guidelines for parents.

When done by trained responders, 30 compressions interrupted by two breaths appears to have a slightly better result than continuous chest compressions with breaths being delivered while compressions are ongoing.

Measurement of end-tidal carbon dioxide during CPR reflects cardiac output and can predict chances of ROSC.

In a study of in-hospital CPR from 2000 to 2008, 59% of CPR survivors lived over a year after hospital discharge and 44% lived over 3 years.

== Consequences ==
Survival rates: In US hospitals in 2017, 26% of patients who received CPR survived to hospital discharge. In 2017 in the US, outside hospitals, 16% of people whose cardiac arrest was witnessed survived to hospital discharge.

Since 2003, widespread cooling of patients after CPR and other improvements have raised survival and reduced mental disabilities.

=== Organ donation ===
Organ donation is usually made possible by CPR, even if CPR does not save the patient. If there is a return of spontaneous circulation (ROSC), all organs can be considered for donation. If the patient does not achieve ROSC, and CPR continues until an operating room is available, the kidneys and liver can still be considered for donation. 1,000 organs per year in the US are transplanted from patients who had CPR. Donations can be taken from 40% of patients who have ROSC and later become brain-dead. Up to 8 organs can be taken from each donor, and an average of 3 organs are taken from each patient who donates organs.

=== Mental abilities ===
Mental abilities are about the same for survivors before and after CPR for 89% of patients, based on before and after counts of 12,500 US patients' Cerebral-Performance Category (CPC) codes in a 2000–2009 study of CPR in hospitals. 1% more survivors were in comas than before CPR. 5% more needed help with daily activities. 5% more had moderate mental problems and could still be independent.

For CPR outside hospitals, a Copenhagen study of 2,504 patients in 2007-2011 found that 21% of survivors developed moderate mental problems but could still be independent, and 11% of survivors developed severe mental problems, so they needed daily help. Two patients out of 2,504 went into comas (0.1% of patients, or 2 out of 419 survivors, 0.5%), and the study did not track how long the comas lasted.

Most people in comas start to recover in 2–3 weeks. 2018 guidelines on disorders of consciousness say it is no longer appropriate to use the term "permanent vegetative state." Mental abilities can continue to improve in the six months after discharge, and in subsequent years. For long-term problems, brains form new paths to replace damaged areas.

=== Injuries ===
Injuries from CPR vary. 87% of patients are not injured by CPR. Overall, injuries are caused in 13% (2009–12 data) of patients, including broken sternum or ribs (9%), lung injuries (3%), and internal bleeding (3%). The internal injuries counted here can include heart contusion, hemopericardium, upper airway complications, damage to the abdominal viscera − lacerations of the liver and spleen, fat emboli, pulmonary complications − pneumothorax, hemothorax, lung contusions. Most injuries did not affect care; only 1% of those given CPR received life-threatening injuries from it.

Broken ribs are present in 3% of those who survive to hospital discharge, and 15% of those who die in the hospital, for an average rate of 9% (2009-12 data) to 8% (1997–99). In the 2009-12 study, 20% of survivors were older than 75. A study in the 1990s found 55% of CPR patients who died before discharge had broken ribs, and a study in the 1960s found 97% did; training and experience levels have improved. Lung injuries were caused in 3% of patients and other internal bleeding in 3% (2009–12).

Bones heal in 1–2 months.

The costal cartilage also breaks in an unknown number of additional cases, which can sound like breaking bones.

The type and frequency of injury can be affected by factors such as sex and age. A 1999 Austrian study of CPR on cadavers, using a machine that alternately compressed the chest and then pulled it outward, found a higher rate of sternal fractures in female cadavers (9 of 17) than males (2 of 20), and found the risk of rib fractures rose with age, though they did not say how much. Children and infants have a low risk of rib fractures during CPR, with an incidence of less than 2%, although, when they do occur, they are usually anterior and multiple.

Where CPR is performed in error by a bystander, on a person not in cardiac arrest, around 2% have injury as a result (although 12% experienced discomfort).

A 2004 overview said, "Chest injury is a price worth paying to achieve optimal efficacy of chest compressions. Cautious or faint-hearted chest compression may save bones in the individual case but not the patient's life."

=== Other side effects ===
The most common side effect is vomiting, which necessitates clearing the mouth so patients do not breathe it in. It happened in 16 of 35 CPR efforts in a 1989 study in King County, Washington.

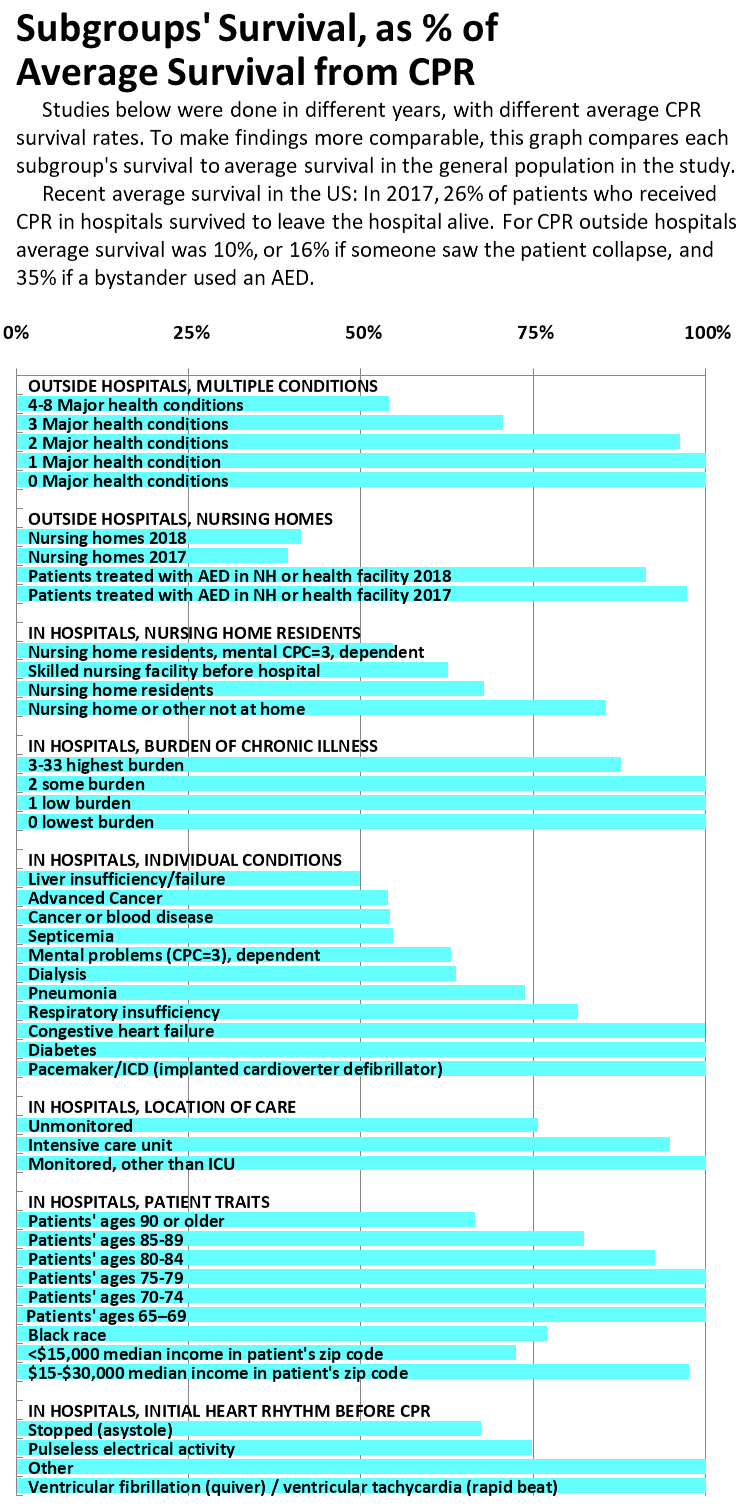
Survival from CPR among various groups

=== Survival differences, based on prior illness, age or location ===
The American Heart Association guidelines say that survival rates below 1% are "futility", but all groups have better survival than that. Even among very sick patients, at least 10% survive: A study of CPR in a sample of US hospitals from 2001 to 2010, where overall survival was 19%, found 10% survival among cancer patients, 12% among dialysis patients, 14% over age 80, 15% among blacks, 17% for patients who lived in nursing homes, 19% for patients with heart failure, and 25% for patients with heart monitoring outside the ICU. Another study, of advanced cancer patients, found the same 10% survival mentioned above. A study of Swedish patients in 2007–2015 with ECG monitors found 40% survived at least 30 days after CPR at ages 70–79, 29% at ages 80–89, and 27% above age 90.

An earlier study of Medicare patients in hospitals from 1992 to 2005, where overall survival was 18%, found 13% survival in the poorest neighborhoods, 12% survival over age 90, 15% survival among ages 85–89, and 17% survival among ages 80–84. Swedish patients 90 years or older had 15% survival to hospital discharge, 80–89 had 20%, and 70–79 had 28%.

A study of King County WA patients who had CPR outside hospitals in 1999–2003, where 34% survived to hospital discharge overall, found that among patients with 4 or more major medical conditions, 18% survived; with 3 major conditions 24% survived, and 33% of those with 2 major medical conditions survived.

Nursing home residents' survival has been studied by several authors, and is measured annually by the Cardiac Arrest Registry to Enhance Survival (CARES). CARES reports CPR results from a catchment area of 115 million people, including 23 state-wide registries, and individual communities in 18 other states as of 2019. CARES data show that in health care facilities and nursing homes where AEDs are available and used, survival rates are double the average survival found in nursing homes overall.

Geographically, there is wide variation from state to state in survival after CPR in US hospitals, from 40% in Wyoming to 20% in New York, so there is room for good practices to spread, raising the averages. For CPR outside hospitals, survival varies even more across the US, from 3% in Omaha to 45% in Seattle in 2001. This study only counted heart rhythms that can respond to defibrillator shocks (tachycardia). A major reason for the variation has been the delay in some areas between the call to emergency services and the departure of medics, and then arrival and treatment. Delays were caused by a lack of monitoring, and the mismatch between recruiting people as firefighters, though most emergency calls they are assigned to are medical, so staff resisted and delayed on the medical calls. Building codes have cut the number of fires, but staff still think of themselves as firefighters.

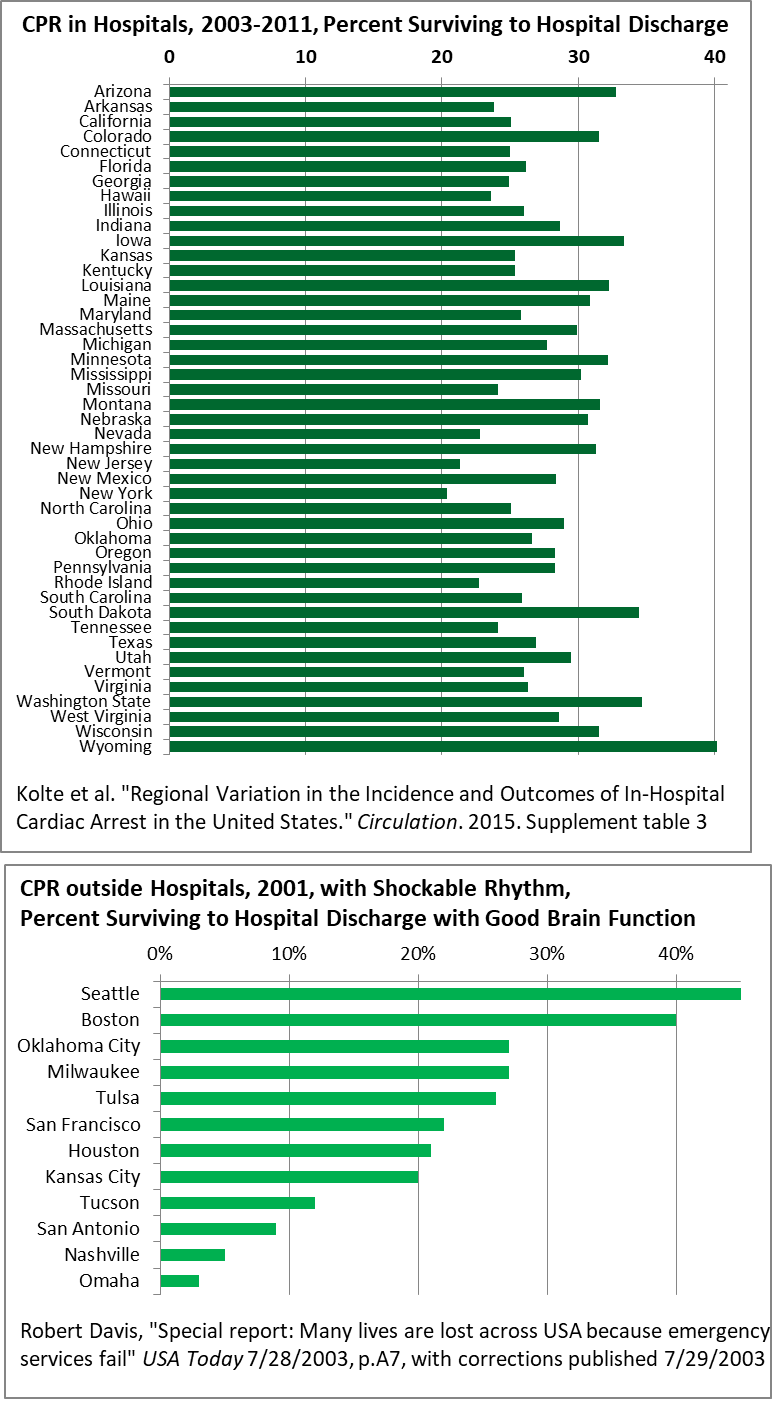
CPR success varies widely, so most places can learn from the best practices.

Table Showing How Well Groups with Different Illnesses Survive to Hospital Discharge after CPR (USA national data, except where noted)
	Survival Rate of Group at Left	Average Survival in Study	Group Rate as Fraction of Average	Subgroup Sample Size	Patients
Current Total, Adults Outside Hospitals	10%	10%	1.0	79,356	2018
AED used by Bystanders on Adult Outside Hospitals, not in health facilities or nursing homes	35%	10%	3.3	1,349	2018
Adults Outside Hospitals, Witnessed, with or without AED	16%	10%	1.6	39,976	2018
Adults Outside Hospitals, Unwitnessed	4%	10%	0.4	39,378	2018
OUTSIDE HOSPITALS, MULTIPLE CONDITIONS, King County WA
4–8 Major health conditions	18%	34%	0.5	98	1999–2003
3 Major health conditions	24%	34%	0.7	125	1999–2003
2 Major health conditions	33%	34%	1.0	211	1999–2003
1 Major health condition	35%	34%	1.0	323	1999–2003
0 Major health conditions	43%	34%	1.3	286	1999–2003
OUTSIDE HOSPITALS, NURSING HOMES
Nursing homes	4.3%	10.4%	0.4	9,105	2018
Nursing homes	4.1%	10.4%	0.4	8,655	2017
Nursing homes	4.4%	10.8%	0.4	6,477	2016
Nursing homes	4.4%	10.6%	0.4	5,695	2015
Nursing homes	4.5%	10.8%	0.4	4,786	2014
Nursing homes	5.0%	10.8%	0.5	3,713	2013
AED used by staff or bystander in nursing home or health facility	9.5%	10.4%	0.9	3,809	2018
AED used by staff or bystander in nursing home or health facility	10.1%	10.4%	1.0	3,329	2017
AED used by staff or bystander in nursing home or health facility	12.2%	10.8%	1.1	2,229	2016
AED used by staff or bystander in nursing home or health facility	10.0%	10.6%	0.9	1,887	2015
AED used by staff or bystander in nursing home or health facility	11.4%	10.8%	1.1	1,422	2014
Nursing homes, group homes, assisted living, King Co. WA	4%	na	na	218	1999–2000
Nursing homes, Denmark, best case, 30 days (witnessed, bystander CPR, AED before hospital)	8%	23%	0.3	135	2001–14
Nursing homes in Denmark, live 30 days	2%	5%	0.4	2,516	2001–14
Nursing homes, Copenhagen	9%	17%	0.6	245	2007–11
Nursing homes, Denmark, ROSC	12%	13%	0.9	2,516	2001–14
Nursing homes, Rochester, ROSC	19%	20%	1.0	42	1998–2001
.
Current Total, Inside Hospitals	26%	26%	1.0	26,178	2017
IN HOSPITALS, NURSING HOME RESIDENTS
Nursing home residents, mental CPC=3, dependent	9%	16%	0.5	1,299	2000–08
Skilled nursing facility before hospital	12%	18%	0.6	10,924	1992–2005
Nursing home residents	11%	16%	0.7	2,845	2000–08
Nursing home or other not home	17%	19%	0.9	34,342	2001–10
IN HOSPITALS, BURDEN OF CHRONIC ILLNESS, Deyo-Charlson score
3–33 highest burden	16%	18%	0.9	94,608	1992–2005
2 some burden	19%	18%	1.0	116,401	1992–2005
1 low burden	19%	18%	1.0	145,627	1992–2005
0 lowest burden	19%	18%	1.0	77,349	1992–2005
IN HOSPITALS, INDIVIDUAL CONDITIONS
Liver insufficiency/failure	10%	19%	0.5	10,154	2001–10
Advanced Cancer	10%	18%	0.5	6,585	2006–10
Cancer or blood disease	10%	19%	0.5	16,640	2001–10
Sepsis	11%	19%	0.5	21,057	2001–10
Mental problems (CPC=3), dependent	10%	16%	0.6	4,251	2000–08
Dialysis	12%	19%	0.6	5,135	2001–10
Pneumonia	14%	19%	0.7	18,277	2001–10
Respiratory insufficiency	16%	19%	0.8	57,054	2001–10
Congestive heart failure	19%	19%	1.0	40,362	2001–10
Diabetes	20%	19%	1.0	41,154	2001–10
Pacemaker/ICD (implanted cardioverter defibrillator)	20%	19%	1.1	10,386	2001–10
IN HOSPITALS, LOCATION OF CARE
Unmonitored	15%	19%	0.8	22,899	2001–10
Intensive care unit	18%	19%	0.9	81,176	2001–10
Monitored, other than ICU	25%	19%	1.3	30,100	2001–10
Monitored, aged 90 or older, Sweden	27%			355	2007–15
Monitored, aged 80–89, Sweden	29%			2,237	2007–15
Monitored, aged 70–79, Sweden	40%			2,609	2007–15
IN HOSPITALS, PATIENT TRAITS
Patients' ages 90 or older, Sweden	15%			1,008	2007–15
Patients' ages 80–89, Sweden	20%			5,156	2007–15
Patients' ages 70–79, Sweden	28%			5,232	2007–15
Patients' ages 90 or older	12%	18%	0.7	34,069	1992–2005
Patients' ages 85–89	15%	18%	0.8	62,530	1992–2005
Patients' ages 80–84	17%	18%	0.9	91,471	1992–2005
Patients' ages 75–79	19%	18%	1.0	98,263	1992–2005
Patients' ages 70–74	21%	18%	1.1	84,353	1992–2005
Patients' ages 65–69	22%	18%	1.2	63,299	1992–2005
Black race	15%	19%	0.8	27,246	2001–10
<$15,000 median income in patient's zip code	13%	18%	0.7	10,626	1992-2005
$15–$30,000 median income in patient's zip code	18%	18%	1.0	87,164	1992–2005
IN HOSPITALS, INITIAL HEART RHYTHM BEFORE CPR
Stopped (asystole)	13%	19%	0.7	46,856	2001–10
Pulseless electrical activity	14%	19%	0.7	53,965	2001–10
Other	24%	19%	1.3	7,422	2001–10
Ventricular fibrillation (quiver) / ventricular tachycardia (rapid beat)	38%	19%	2.0	27,653	2001–10
Cancer was also studied by Champigneulle et al.in Paris. In 2015 they reported survival after patients entered ICUs, not overall. Cancer ICU patients had the same ICU mortality and 6-month mortality as matched non-cancer ICU patients.

Table Showing Survival Rate in Hospitals in Each US State, 2003-2011
State	Survival to Hospital Discharge
USA	24.7%
Wyoming	40.2%
Washington	34.7%
South Dakota	34.5%
Iowa	33.4%
Arizona	32.8%
Louisiana	32.3%
Minnesota	32.2%
Montana	31.6%
Colorado	31.5%
Wisconsin	31.5%
New Hampshire	31.3%
Maine	30.9%
Nebraska	30.7%
Mississippi	30.2%
Massachusetts	29.9%
Utah	29.5%
Ohio	29.0%
Indiana	28.7%
West Virginia	28.6%
New Mexico	28.4%
Oregon	28.3%
Pennsylvania	28.3%
Michigan	27.7%
Texas	26.9%
Oklahoma	26.6%
Virginia	26.3%
Florida	26.2%
Illinois	26.0%
Vermont	26.0%
South Carolina	25.9%
Maryland	25.8%
Kansas	25.4%
Kentucky	25.4%
California	25.1%
North Carolina	25.1%
Connecticut	25.0%
Georgia	24.9%
Missouri	24.1%
Tennessee	24.1%
Arkansas	23.8%
Hawaii	23.6%
Nevada	22.8%
Rhode Island	22.7%
New Jersey	21.3%
New York	20.4%

=== Dysthanasia ===
In some instances, CPR can be considered a form of dysthanasia.

== Prevalence ==
=== Chance of receiving CPR ===
Various studies show that in out-of-home cardiac arrest, bystanders in the US attempt CPR in between 14% and 45% of the time, with a median of 32%. Globally, rates of bystander CPR are reported to be as low as 1% and as high as 44%. However, the effectiveness of this CPR is variable, and the studies suggest only around half of bystander CPR is performed correctly. One study found that members of the public having received CPR training in the past lack the skills and confidence needed to save lives. The report's authors suggested that better training is needed to improve the willingness to respond to cardiac arrest. Factors that influence bystander CPR in out-of-hospital cardiac arrest include:

- Affordable training
- Target CPR training to family members of potential cardiac arrest
- CPR classes should be simplified and shortened
- Offer reassurance and education about CPR
- Provide clearer information about legal implications for specific regions
- Focus on reducing the stigma and fears around providing bystander CPR

There is a relation between age and the chance of CPR being commenced. Younger people are far more likely to have CPR attempted on them before the arrival of emergency medical services. Bystanders more commonly administer CPR when in public than when at the person's home, although healthcare professionals are responsible for more than half of out-of-hospital resuscitation attempts. People with no connection to the person are more likely to perform CPR than family members.

There is also a clear relation between the cause of arrest and the likelihood of a bystander initiating CPR. Laypersons are most likely to give CPR to younger people in cardiac arrest in a public place when it has a medical cause; those in arrest from trauma, exsanguination or intoxication are less likely to receive CPR.

It is believed that there is a higher chance that CPR will be performed if the bystander is told to perform only the chest compression element of the resuscitation.

The first formal study into gender bias in receiving CPR from the public versus professionals was conducted by the American Heart Association and the National Institutes of Health (NIH), and examined nearly 20,000 cases across the U.S. The study found that women are six percent less likely than men to receive bystander CPR when in cardiac arrest in a public place, citing the disparity as "likely due to the fear of being falsely accused of sexual assault."

=== Chance of receiving CPR in time ===
CPR is likely to be effective only if commenced within 6 minutes after the blood flow stops because permanent brain cell damage occurs when fresh blood infuses the cells after that time, since the cells of the brain become dormant in as little as 4–6 minutes in an oxygen-deprived environment and, therefore, cannot survive the reintroduction of oxygen in a traditional resuscitation. Research using cardioplegic blood infusion resulted in a 79.4% survival rate with cardiac arrest intervals of 72±43 minutes, traditional methods achieve a 15% survival rate in this scenario, by comparison. New research is currently needed to determine what role CPR, defibrillation, and new advanced gradual resuscitation techniques will have with this new knowledge.

A notable exception is cardiac arrest which occurs in conjunction with exposure to very cold temperatures. Hypothermia seems to protect by slowing down metabolic and physiologic processes, greatly decreasing the tissues' need for oxygen. There are cases where CPR, defibrillation, and advanced warming techniques have revived victims after substantial periods of hypothermia.

== Society and culture ==
=== Portrayed effectiveness ===
CPR is often severely misrepresented in movies and television as being highly effective in resuscitating a person who is not breathing and has no circulation.

A 1996 study published in the New England Journal of Medicine showed that CPR success rates in television shows were 75% for immediate circulation, and 67% survival to discharge. This gives the general public an unrealistic expectation of a successful outcome. When educated on the actual survival rates, the proportion of patients over 60 years of age desiring CPR should they have a cardiac arrest drops from 41% to 22%.

=== Training and stage CPR ===
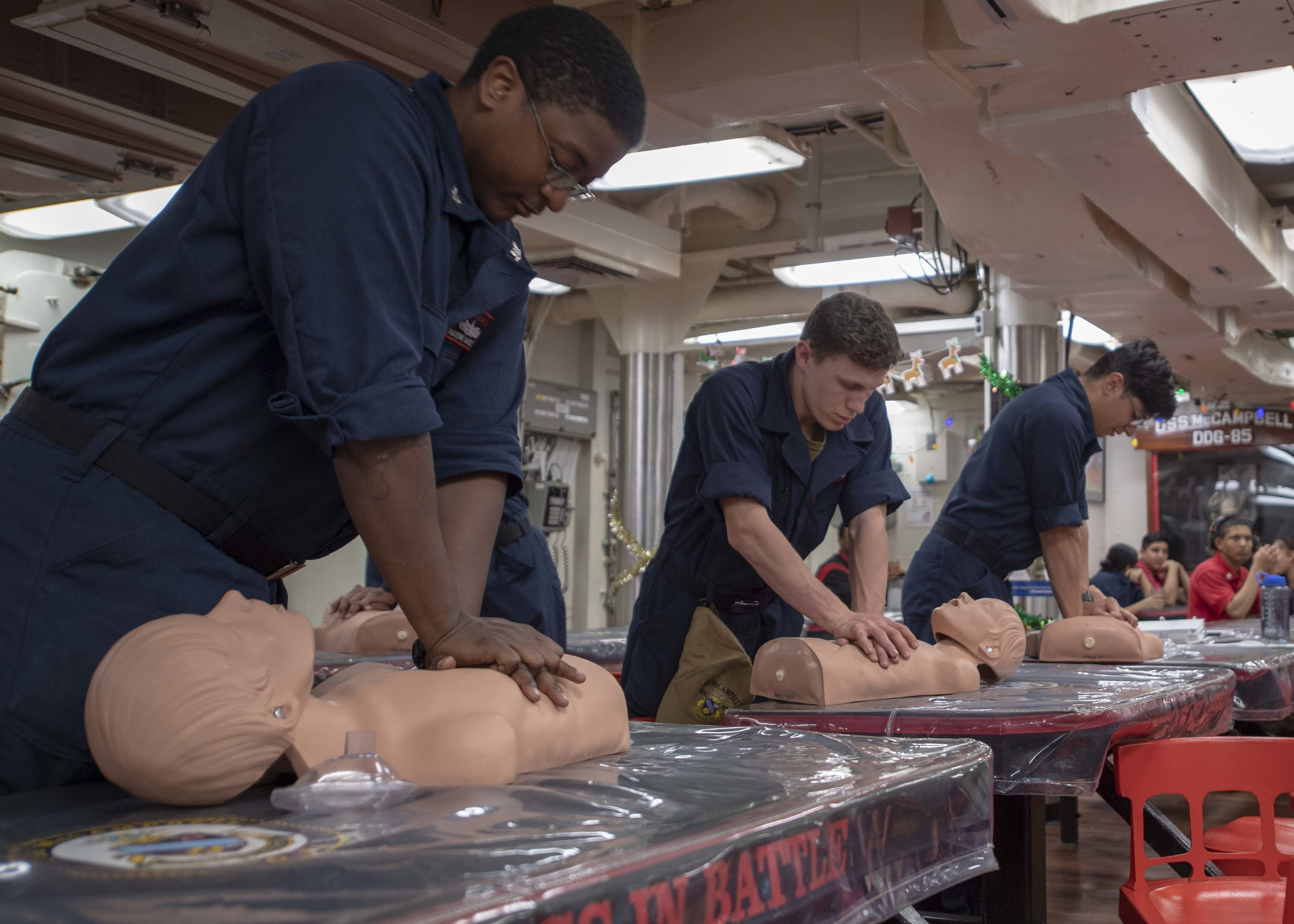
US Navy sailors practice chest compressions on mannequins.

It is dangerous to perform CPR on a person who is breathing normally. These chest compressions create significant local blunt trauma, risking bruising or fracture of the sternum or ribs. If a patient is not breathing, these risks still exist but are dwarfed by the immediate threat to life. For this reason, training is always done with a mannequin, such as the well-known Resusci Anne model.

The portrayal of the CPR technique on television and film often is purposely incorrect. Actors simulating the performance of CPR may bend their elbows while appearing to compress, to prevent force from reaching the chest of the actor portraying the patient.

As a result, many public misconceptions exist about CPR can discourage bystanders from providing assistance during cardiac arrest. Common misunderstandings include the belief that mouth-to-mouth ventilation is always required, that CPR restarts the heart, or that performing CPR will inevitably cause serious injury. Public education campaigns and training at an accredited training organisation important to support providing adequate CPR and correcting misconceptions to increase willingness to intervene in emergencies.

=== Self-CPR hoax ===
A form of "self-CPR" termed "cough CPR" was the subject of a hoax chain e-mail entitled "How to Survive a Heart Attack When Alone", which wrongly cited "Via Health Rochester General Hospital" as the source of the technique. Rochester General Hospital has denied any connection with the technique.

"Cough CPR" in the sense of resuscitating oneself is impossible because a prominent symptom of cardiac arrest is unconsciousness, which makes coughing impossible.

The American Heart Association (AHA) and other resuscitation bodies do not endorse "cough CPR", which it terms a misnomer as it is not a form of resuscitation. The AHA does recognize a limited legitimate use of the coughing technique: "This coughing technique to maintain blood flow during brief arrhythmias has been useful in the hospital, particularly during cardiac catheterization. In such cases, the patient's ECG is monitored continuously, and a physician is present." When coughing is used on trained and monitored patients in hospitals, it is effective only for 90 seconds.

=== Learning from film ===
In at least one case, it has been alleged that CPR learned from a film was used to save a person's life. In April 2011, it was claimed that nine-year-old Tristin Saghin saved his sister's life by administering CPR on her after she fell into a swimming pool, using only the knowledge of CPR that he had gleaned from a motion picture, Black Hawk Down.

=== Hands-only CPR portrayal ===
Less than 1/3 of those people who experience a cardiac arrest at home, work, or in a public location have CPR performed on them. Most bystanders are worried that they might do something wrong. On October 28, 2009, the American Heart Association and the Ad Council launched a hands-only CPR public service announcement and website as a means to address this issue. In July 2011, new content was added to the website including a digital app that helps a user learn how to perform hands-only CPR.

== History ==
In the 19th century, Doctor H. R. Silvester described a method (the Silvester method) of artificial ventilation in which the patient is laid on their back, and their arms are raised above their head to aid inhalation and then pressed against their chest to aid exhalation. The Holger Nielsen technique of artificial respiration, developed by Danish physician Holger Nielsen, revolutionized the field of emergency medical care. Introduced in the early 20th century, this technique involved positioning the patient in a supine position (lying flat on their back) and the performer of the technique kneeling beside or above the patient. The Holger Nielsen technique utilized a manual resuscitator, commonly referred to as the "Holger Nielsen bag," to administer rescue breaths. The performer would place a mask or the bag's mouthpiece over the patient's mouth and nose while manually compressing the bag. This action would deliver a controlled flow of air into the patient's lungs, aiding in oxygenation and facilitating the exchange of gases.

It was not until the middle of the 20th century that the wider medical community started to recognize and promote artificial ventilation in the form of mouth-to-mouth resuscitation combined with chest compressions as a key part of resuscitation following cardiac arrest. The combination was first seen in a 1962 training video called "The Pulse of Life" created by James Jude, Guy Knickerbocker, and Peter Safar. Jude and Knickerbocker, along with William Kouwenhoven and Joseph S. Redding had recently discovered the method of external chest compressions, whereas Safar had worked with Redding and James Elam to prove the effectiveness of mouth-to-mouth resuscitation. The first effort at testing the technique was performed on a dog by Redding, Safar, and JW Pearson. Soon afterward, the technique was used to save the life of a child. Their combined findings were presented at the annual Maryland Medical Society meeting on September 16, 1960, in Ocean City, and gained widespread acceptance over the following decade, helped by the video and speaking tour they undertook. Peter Safar wrote the book ABC of Resuscitation in 1957. In the U.S., it was first promoted as a technique for the public to learn in the 1970s.

Mouth-to-mouth resuscitation was combined with chest compressions based on the assumption that active ventilation is necessary to keep circulating blood oxygenated, and the combination was accepted without comparing its effectiveness with chest compressions alone. However, research in the 2000s demonstrated that assumption to be in error, resulting in the American Heart Association's acknowledgment of the effectiveness of chest compressions alone (see Compression only in this article).

CPR methods continued to advance, with developments in the 2010s including an emphasis on constant, rapid heart stimulation, and a de-emphasis on the respiration aspect. Studies have shown that people who had rapid, constant heart-only chest compression are 22% more likely to survive than those receiving conventional CPR that included breathing. Because people tend to be reluctant to do mouth-to-mouth resuscitation, chest-only CPR nearly doubles the chances of survival overall, by increasing the odds of receiving CPR in the first place.

== On animals ==
It is feasible to perform CPR on animals, including cats and dogs. The principles and practices are similar to CPR for humans, except that resuscitation is usually done through the animal's nose, not the mouth. CPR should only be performed on unconscious animals to avoid the risk of being bitten; a conscious animal would not require chest compressions. Animals, depending on species, may have a lower bone density than humans and so CPR can cause bones to become weakened after it is performed.

== Research ==
Cerebral performance category (CPC scores) are used as a research tool to describe "good" and "poor" outcomes. Level 1 is conscious and alert with normal function. Level 2 is only slight disability. Level 3 is a moderate disability. Level 4 is a severe disability. Level 5 is comatose or persistent vegetative state. Level 6 is brain dead or death from other causes.

== See also ==
- Advance healthcare directive
- Automated external defibrillator (AED)
- Do not resuscitate
- Impedance threshold device
- Lazarus syndrome, spontaneous autoresuscitation where attempts at artificial resuscitation have failed
- Slow code
