= Asahi Kasei =

Japanese chemicals company

Asahi Kasei Corporation

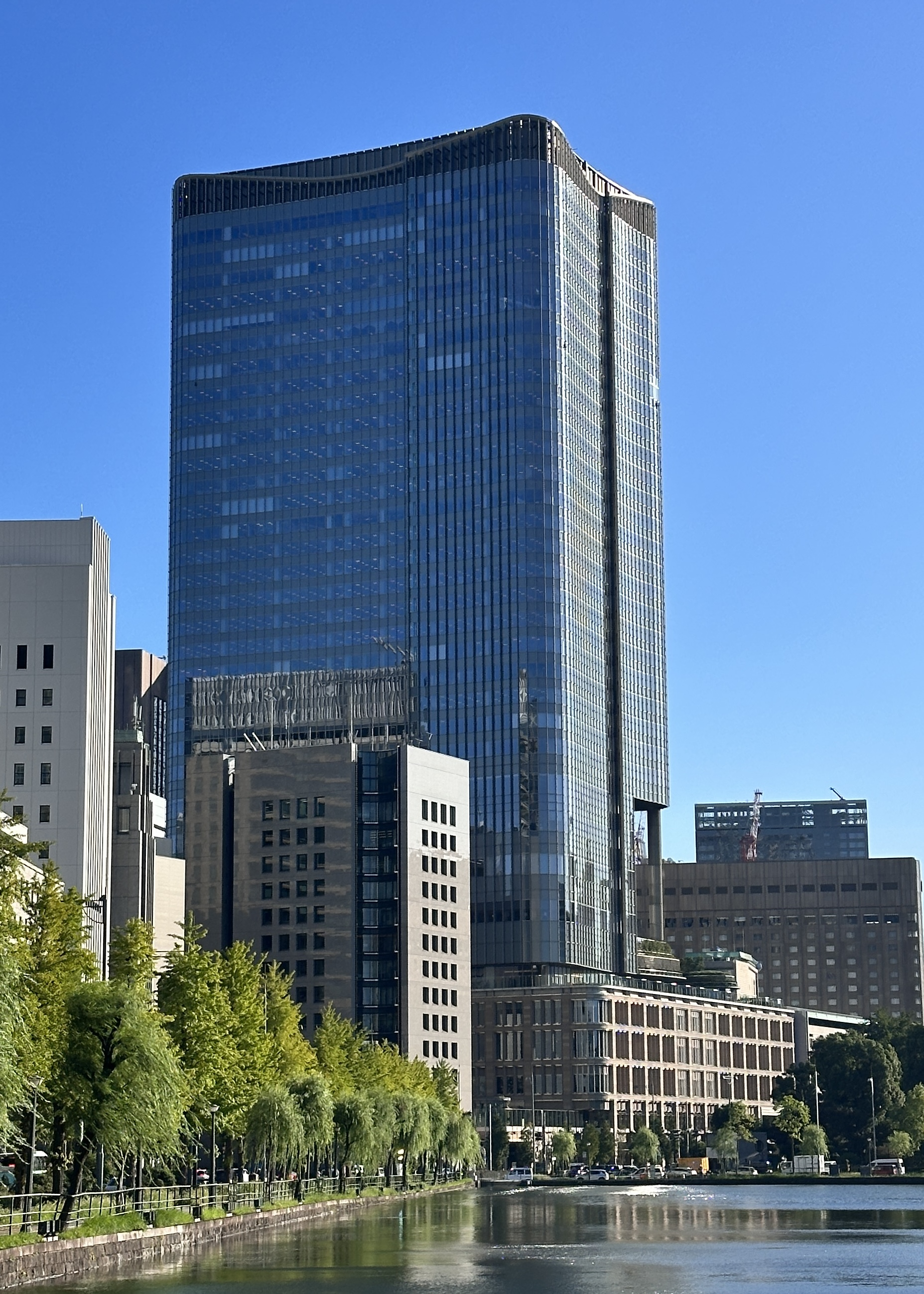
- Headquarters in Yūrakuchō, Chiyoda, Tokyo
- Native name: 旭化成株式会社
- Romanized name: Asahi Kasei kabushiki gaisha
- Type: Public
- Traded as: TYO: 3407; TOPIX Large 70 Component; TOPIX 100 Component; Nikkei 225 Component
- Industry: Chemical industry
- Founded: May 21, 1931; 95 years ago
- Headquarters: Hibiya Mitsui Tower, 1-1-2 Yūrakuchō, Chiyoda, Tokyo 100-0006 Japan
- Key people: Koshiro Kudo (president)
- Products: Chemicals; Fibers; Construction materials; Pharmaceuticals; Medical devices; Electronic devices and materials
- Revenue: ▲$ 18.5 billion (FY 2014) (¥ 1,897 billion) (FY 2014)
- Net income: ▲$ 989.7 million (FY 2014) (¥ 101.29 billion) (FY 2014)
- Number of employees: 46,751 (consolidated as of March 31, 2022)
- Website: www.asahi-kasei.com

Asahi Kasei Corporation (旭化成株式会社, Asahi Kasei Kabushiki-gaisha; styled as AsahiKASEI) is a multinational Japanese chemical company. Its main products are chemicals and materials.

It was founded in May 1931, using the paid-in capital of Nobeoka Ammonia Fiber Co., Ltd, a Nobeoka, Miyazaki-based producer of ammonia, nitric acid, and other chemicals. Now headquartered in Tokyo, with offices and plants across Japan, as well as China, Singapore, Thailand, the United States and Germany.

The company is listed on the first section of Tokyo Stock Exchange and is a constituent of the TOPIX 100 and Nikkei 225 stock market indices.

== History ==
The company Asahi Kasei began in 1931 with the production of chemicals, which included ammonia and nitric acids. In 1949, exchanges between stocks started up between Tokyo, Osaka, and Nagoya. Asahi Kasei entered into a joint petrochemical venture with Dow Chemical. A production of polystyrene and Saran Wrap began in 1952. Diversification into acrylonitrile, construction materials, petrochemicals, glass fabrics, ethylene, housing, medical devices, electronics, engineered resins, semiconductors, pharmaceuticals and liquors began in the 1960s and 1990s. Net sales exceeded $10 billion globally from 2000 to 2003. Finally, in 2008 and 2009, there was further diversification into medical devices. In 2018, Asahi Kasei acquired Sage Automotive Interiors.

On September 10, 2025, former company president Ichiro Ito died. As of January 2022, the company was led by Koshiro Kudo.

== Statistics ==
The company makes about 18 billion dollars globally in annual net sales. Their core operating segments include:

- Chemicals (43.4%)
- Homes (27.2%)
- Healthcare (7.95%)
- Fibers (7%)
- Electronics (10%)
- Construction materials (3.3%)
- Services, engineering, and others (1.2%)

== Locations ==
As of March 2022, Asahi Kasei employs 46,751 people and has a total of 54 manufacturing facilities found in different areas all over the world, including North America, Europe, South Asia, East Asia, and Japan.

Their operations in North America are located in Alabama, California, Illinois, Kentucky, Michigan, New York, New Jersey, North Carolina, Massachusetts, and Mexico. In Europe it has sites in Austria, Belgium, Czech Republic, France, Germany, Italy, Netherlands, Poland, Romania, Spain, Sweden, and United Kingdom. The sites in Japan are located in Tokyo, Kawasaki, Nobeoka, and Mizushima. The sites in South and East Asia operate in India, Suzhou, Shanghai, Thailand, and Singapore.

== Business segments and products ==
The main operations of the company are divided into the following four business sectors:

- Chemicals and fibers
  - Chemicals
  - Polymer products
  - Specialty chemicals
  - Fibers
- Homes and construction materials
  - Foundation systems
  - Insulation materials
  - AAC-related products
  - Structural materials
  - Order-built homes
  - Real estate–related operations
  - Building remodeling
- Electronics
  - LSIs
  - Hall effect elements, magnetometers and Hall ICs
  - Clean energy materials
  - Optical and printing materials
  - Electronic materials
- Health care
  - Blood transfusion devices
  - Blood purification devices
  - Bioprocess products: leukocyte reduction filters, virus removal filters
  - Orthopedics and urology pharmaceuticals
  - Critical care devices: defibrillators, wearable defibrillators, automated CPR systems, temperature management systems, data solutions
  - Diagnostic reagents
  - Nutritional products
