= Dysthanasia =

Medical term concerning life support

In medicine, dysthanasia occurs when a person who is dying has their biological life extended through technological means without regard to the person's quality of life. The term dysthanasia means "bad death" (from the Greek language: δυσ, dus; "bad", "difficult" + θάνατος, thanatos; "death") and is considered by some to be a common fault of modern medicine. Technologies such as an implantable cardioverter defibrillator, artificial ventilation, ventricular assist devices, and extracorporeal membrane oxygenation can extend the dying process. In some cases, cardiopulmonary resuscitation can be considered a form of dysthanasia.

== See also ==
- Brain death
- Death with Dignity National Center
- Euthanasia
- Life support
- Palliative care
