= LUCAS device =

Device to provide mechanical CPR

Video of a Lucas 3 CPR device active on a mannequin.

The Lund University Cardiopulmonary Assist System (LUCAS) device provides mechanical chest compressions to patients in cardiac arrest. It is mostly used in emergency medicine as an alternative to manual cardiopulmonary resuscitation (CPR) because it provides consistent compressions at a fixed rate through difficult transport conditions and eliminates the physical strain on the person performing CPR. The first generation of the LUCAS device (released in 2003) was pneumatic, while the second and third generations are battery-operated.

== Use ==
The LUCAS can be used both in and out of the hospital setting. The 2015 European Resuscitation Council Guidelines for Resuscitation does not recommend using mechanical chest compression on a routine basis, but it is a good alternative for situations where it may be difficult or to maintain continuous high-quality compressions, or when it may be too strenuous on the medic to do so. However, more ambulance services have integrated it into their ACLS protocols, usually recommending the application of the LUCAS after roughly 15 minutes of CPR by first responders without success.

To place the device on the patient, the medic first places the back plate under the patient. This eliminates the "mattress effect" and ensures the device stays in place. Next, the medic attaches the upper part of the device by locking the support legs onto the sides of the back board. Once everything is lined up correctly, the medic can place the suction cup over the patient's chest and turn it on. Finally, the medic will buckle the stabilization strap around the back of the patient's neck and secure their wrists to the device to make transport easier.

The LUCAS can be set to different rates and compression modes depending on what the patient's situation requires.

=== Effectiveness ===
When in transport via ground ambulance, even experienced resuscitators can struggle to maintain effective compressions with minimal interruptions. Piston-based mechanical CPR devices have been shown to provide higher-quality chest compressions in a moving ambulance, in addition to the obvious safety benefits of allowing EMS personnel to remain restrained during transport.

The LUCAS device delivers high-quality compressions at a continuous rate, while up to a third of manual compressions can be incorrect. In 2013, a 68-year-old male made a complete recovery, including no intellectual or neurological deficits, after an out-of-hospital cardiac arrest after 59 minutes of mechanical compressions on a LUCAS device.

People with out-of-hospital cardiac arrest do not have a higher chance of return of spontaneous circulation (ROSC) with a LUCAS device (33.3%) versus manual CPR (33.0%). There is not a significant difference in those who survive to hospital admission, either: 22.7% survival with LUCAS versus 24.3% with manual CPR.

As of 2025, the American Heart Association recommends against the routine use of mechanical CPR devices, such as the LUCAS.

== Development ==
After watching paramedics struggling to perform manual CPR on a patient while in the back of a speeding ambulance, Norwegian inventor Willy Vistung came up with the idea for a pneumatic system that could provide automatic, mechanical chest compressions. Cardiothoracic surgeon Stig Steen supported Vistung's idea, and after Vistung's death, Swedish entrepreneur Lars Sunnanväder and Steen developed the final prototype. Steen and his research team did studies at Lund University Hospital, and in 2000, Steen began using it clinically.

In 2003, Swedish ambulances began using the first generation of the LUCAS device, which was driven pneumatically. In 2009, the second generation LUCAS, which had both pneumatic and battery-driven configurations, was released worldwide. In 2016, the most recent generation, LUCAS 3, became commercially available.

== See also ==
- AutoPulse
