= Smoke-Free Air Act =

New Jersey law banning smoking in many places

Smoke-Free Air Logo

The New Jersey Smoke-Free Air Act is a comprehensive smoking ban that took effect in New Jersey on April 15, 2006. The law prohibits smoking in most workplaces as well as in indoor public areas. The Act has been amended a number of times including in 2009 to extend the ban to electronic smoking devices and in 2018 to extend the ban to public parks and beaches. A notable exception to the smoking ban is in casinos, but legislation to remove this exception is currently pending in the New Jersey Legislature. The New Jersey Smoke-Free Air Act also allows municipalities to enact their own restrictions on smoking.

== Enactment ==
The New Jersey Smoke-Free Air Act was introduced to the New Jersey Senate on October 14, 2004, by Senator John H. Adler and Senator Thomas H. Kean, Jr. The bill was passed by the New Jersey Senate on December 15, 2005, with a vote of 29 to 7 and by the New Jersey Assembly on January 9, 2006, with a vote of 64 to 12. The bill was signed into law by New Jersey Governor Richard Codey on January 15, 2006, with an effective date of April 15, 2006.

== Provisions ==
The primary goal of the bill was to prohibit smoking in indoor public places and workplaces to benefit the public interest. The Smoke-Free Air Act stated that separate sections for smoking and nonsmoking sections in workplaces and indoor public areas were not eliminating the health hazard to nonsmokers and banning smoking altogether in these areas was a necessary solution to this problem.

The bill proceeded to list all of the "indoor public places" and "workplaces" where smoking was banned, including, but not limited to:

- Commercial and office buildings, both private and state-owned.
- Public and private schools, both on the grounds of and in the buildings.
- Theaters, concert halls, public libraries, museums or art galleries.
- Restaurants and bars.
- Garages and other parking facilities.
- Public transportation vehicles, stations and platforms.
- Healthcare facilities and offices, childcare facilities.
- Sporting facilities, racetracks.
- Shopping malls and retail stores.
- Hotels, motels, and other overnight facilities.
- Apartment building lobbies, other public areas in private buildings, and all elevators other than private houses.

=== Exemptions ===
The New Jersey Smoke-Free Air Act lists a number of exceptions to the smoking ban including:

- Cigar bars and lounges (entirely enclosed and ventilated) which make 15% of their income from tobacco. products and which were in existence and have not expanded or changed their locations since 2004.
- Tobacco retail establishments and areas they provide for smoking purposes.
- Tobacco businesses where the testing of a cigar or pipe tobacco is a necessary part of the business.
- Private homes, private residences, and private automobiles.
- Any casino facility that contains at least 150 slot machines, at least 10 table games, or some combination approved by the Casino Control Commission.
- Any casino facility that contains "a simulcast counter and dedicated seating for at least 50 simulcast patrons or a simulcast operation and at least 10 table games."
- Up to 20% of the rooms in a hotel or motel.

=== Signage requirements ===
The bill requires anyone with control over indoor public places or workplaces to place signs at their entrance in order to be visible to the public, indicating that smoking is prohibited therein. The sign shall also state that violaters of this nonsmoking ban would be subject to a fine. In addition, in those areas where smoking is permitted, the person having control over these areas shall post a sign stating that smoking is permitted.

=== Penalties ===
When a person is in violation of the New Jersey Smoke-Free Air Act, they are required by law to be given a warning by the person in control of the indoor public place or workplace. If the violator refuses to comply after they are given a warning, they are "subject to a fine of not less than $250 for the first offense, $500 for the second offense, and $1,000 for each subsequent offense."

An indoor public place or workplace that fails to comply with the New Jersey Smoke-Free Air Act shall receive written notice of their violation by the Department of Health and Senior Services or the local board of health. A person who fails to comply after being given a written notice is "subject to a fine of not less than $250 for the first offense, $500 for the second offense, and $1,000 for each subsequent offense." In addition to this penalty, a court may order the workplace or indoor public place to immediately comply with the provisions of the act.

The proceedings will be enforced in municipal court, providing that the "violation has occurred within the territorial jurisdiction of the court."

== Later amendments ==
=== Electronic smoking devices ===
The New Jersey Smoke-Free Air Act was amended in 2009 to prohibit the use of electronic smoking devices in indoor public places and to disallow the selling of these devices to minors. The amendment was introduced on November 23, 2009, by Assemblywoman Connie Wagner, Assemblywoman Nancy F. Munoz, Assemblywoman, Joan M. Voss, Assemblyman Paul D. Moriarty and Assemblywoman Mary Pat Angelini. The amendment was signed into law by Governor Jon Corzine on January 11, 2010 and became effective on March 13, 2010. New Jersey became the first state in the nation to ban e-cigarettes in public places and workplaces.

The justification for the banning of electronic smoking devices from indoor public places and workplaces was that they have not been approved as to safety and efficacy by the FDA and they may pose unknown health risks to persons exposed to their smoke. In addition, the bill's comments stated that electronic cigarettes contain propylene glycol, which is used in antifreeze and is a known irritant when inhaled.

=== Beaches and public parks ===
New Jersey amended the Smoke-Free Air Act in 2018 to include a ban on smoking on all beaches in the state. The bill was introduced on May 10, 2018, by Senator Stephen M. Sweeney, Senator Vin Gopal, Senator Bob Smith, Assemblyman Vincent Mazzeo, Assemblyman Clinton Calabrese, Assemblywoman Valerie Vainieri Huttle, and Assemblyman Paul D. Moriarty. Another version of the amendment was ultimately approved on June 7, 2018, which added public parks to the prohibited smoking areas. Governor Phil Murphy signed the law into effect on July 20, 2018, and the law went into effect 180 days later on January 16, 2019.

The justification for the amended ban of both beaches and parks is that the prohibition helps to protect New Jersey's "natural assets" while reducing secondhand smoke exposure. The amendment exempted parking lots adjacent to beaches and public parks, as well as golf courses. Enforcement of the ban is left up to the local municipalities. Municipalities and local counties are able to designate 15 percent of the total area of the beach as a smoking section.

A further amendment to the New Jersey Smoke-Free Air Act was proposed by Assemblywoman Carol A. Murphy and Kevin J. Rooney on October 24, 2022, to prohibit smoking at additional outdoor areas. The proposed bill removes "park or beach" from the current act's text and replaces it with "outdoor public place." The proposed bill expands on "outdoor public place" to include any "race track facility, facility used for the holding of sporting events, amusement park...any State, county or municipal-owned or leased park, forest, beach, boardwalk, recreational area, marina, historic site, burial site, natural area, or other State-owned or leased land." The bill also exempts adjacent parking lots from the ban. While it is unclear of the bills passage chances and it has not been scheduled for a vote; the amended bill does have some bi-partisan support.

=== Casinos ===
Casinos were originally exempted from the New Jersey Smoke-Free Air Act, despite the inclusion of bars and restaurants in the ban. In New Jersey, the Atlantic City casinos provide a great deal of revenue to the state, and it was thought that this exemption was needed in order for the act to pass. The exemption received criticism from bar and restaurant groups as being discriminatory. Due to the exemption, casino workers are subjected to illnesses from secondhand smoke that their counterparts in bars and restaurants do not experience.

After years of lawmakers trying to outlaw casino smoking sections, lawmakers introduced a bill in 2022 that would ban smoking in casinos. Up until this time, as other states had banned smoking in their own casinos, smokers indulged in Atlantic City casinos. The law was introduced on February 7, 2022, by Assemblyman William F. Moon, Jr., Assemblyman Paul D. Moriarty, and Assemblyman Herb Conaway, Jr. and specifically deleted the exception for casinos in the original "New Jersey Smoke-Free Air Act" under section 5e. The amendment stated that the casino exemption needed to be rescinded due to the health effects that casino workers are experiencing due to secondhand smoke, including being at greater risk for lung and heart disease.

Many Atlantic City casino workers are hoping that the amendment passes. Numerous casino workers testified in front of state Assembly committees in March 2023 in favor of the amendment's passage. The bill has enough sponsors to likely pass if it were to reach a vote in the New Jersey Legislature, while Governor Murphy has said he will sign it into law if it reaches his desk. The bill has yet to come to a vote, however, and it is unclear whether it will come to a vote anytime in the near future.

On 5 April 2024, the United Auto Workers and casino workers filed a lawsuit in New Jersey Superior Court challenging the Smoke-Free Air Act’s casino exemption and seeking to have it declared unconstitutional. Superior Court Judge Patrick Bartels dismissed the lawsuit and allowed smoking to continue in Atlantic City casinos on 30 August 2024. The American Lung Association’s annual State of Tobacco Control report in January 2025 urged New Jersey lawmakers to amend the state’s smokefree law to include casinos. The Superior Court, Appellate Division revived the United Auto Workers-backed lawsuit challenging the casino exemption on 26 January 2026, and remanded the case for further proceedings.

== Local restrictions ==
The bill allowed local municipalities to enact their own local restrictions on smoking. According to the CDC website, over 313 communities in New Jersey ban smoking in parks and recreational areas. The bill specifically allowed municipalities to "provide restrictions on or prohibitions against smoking equivalent to, or greater than, those provided under this act."

The following regulations are some examples of restrictions that towns and counties have enacted following the New Jersey Smoke-Free Air Act's passage:

- Essex County banned smoking in any county-owned park in 2015.
- Bloomingdale, New Jersey enacted an ordinance making the local parks and recreation areas smoke free in 2016.
- Fort Lee, New Jersey passed an ordinance prohibiting smoking at outdoor restaurants and cafes in 2015, and another ordinance banning smoking at public parks in 2014.
- Wyckoff, New Jersey banned smoking in all municipal parks in 2013.
- Point Pleasant, New Jersey had already banned smoking on the boardwalk, beaches, and band shell area, but in 2022 it expanded that ban to the sidewalks and street ends adjacent to these areas.

The bill banned smoking in common areas of residential buildings, but many property managers decided to make their entire buildings smoke free after the bill went into effect.
