= Impedance threshold device =

Valve present in CPR breathing devices

- Specialty: Cardiology
- [edit on Wikidata]

An inspiratory impedance threshold device is a valve used in cardiopulmonary resuscitation (CPR) to decrease intrathoracic pressure and improve venous return to the heart. The valve is a part of a mask or other breathing device such as an endotracheal tube, and may open at high or low pressures (called "cracking pressures")

== Overview ==
ITDs are still in the early phases of clinical use, but preliminary investigational studies have suggested a potential benefit in achieving return of spontaneous circulation (ROSC) and early improvement after cardiopulmonary arrest in humans. More recently, the Resuscitation Outcomes Consortium (ROC) Prehospital Resuscitation Impedance Valve and Early Versus Delayed Analysis (PRIMED) study (n=8718) failed to demonstrate improved outcomes with the use of an impedance threshold device (ITD) as an adjunct to conventional CPR when compared with use of a sham device.

Quality of cardiopulmonary resuscitation (CPR) was a deciding factor, with ITD increasing survival when in combination with "acceptable" CPR quality, but decreasing survival when CPR quality was not "acceptable". This negative high-quality study prompted a Class III: No Benefit recommendation regarding routine use of the ITD.

ITD use may only be beneficial if the cardiac arrest is witnessed and the response time is rapid.
