= The Unknown (1936 film) =

1936 film directed by Frank Wisbar

- Directed by: Frank Wisbar
- Written by: Reinhold Conrad Muschler (novel); Frank Wisbar
- Starring: Sybille Schmitz; Jean Galland; Ilse Abel
- Cinematography: Werner Bohne; Alexander von Lagorio
- Edited by: Lena Neumann
- Music by: Hans-Otto Borgmann; Herbert Windt
- Production company: Terra Film
- Distributed by: Terra Film
- Release date: 12 November 1936
- Running time: 92 minutes
- Country: Germany
- Language: German

The Unknown (German: Die Unbekannte) is a 1936 German drama film directed by Frank Wisbar and starring Sybille Schmitz, Jean Galland and Ilse Abel. The film's sets were designed by the art directors Benno von Arent and Artur Günther. Location shooting took place around Berlin, Stuttgart and Dinkelsbühl in Bavaria. It was inspired by the Unknown Woman of the Seine and based on a novel by Reinhold Conrad Muschler.

== Cast ==
- Sybille Schmitz as Madeleine
- Jean Galland as Thomas Bentick
- Ilse Abel as Evelyn – seine Braut
- Edwin Jürgensen as Ministerialrat van Altendorf
- F.W. Schröder-Schrom as Gieseking – Großindustrieller
- Aribert Mog as Gerhard – sein Sohn
- Lotte Spira as Hausdame bei Bentick
- Karl Platen as Diener bei Platen
- Karel Stepanek as Manager at Regina's
- Karin Luesebrink as Tanzmädchen
- Herbert Spalke as Radio Mann
- Charlie Kracker as Ein Dieb
- Günther Polensen as Polizeioffizier
- Hellmuth Passarge as Wachthabender
- Curd Jürgens as Hans Wellenkamp
- Lucy Millowitsch as Stimmungssängerin
- Horst Breitkopf as Ein Herr in besten Jahren
- Alfred Kiwitt as Ein Gast

== Bibliography ==
- Nicolella, Henry (2018). Frank Wisbar: The Director of Ferryman Maria, from Germany to America and Back. McFarland. ISBN 978-1-4766-2976-6.
