= List of statues of Joseph Stalin =

Stalin's statues

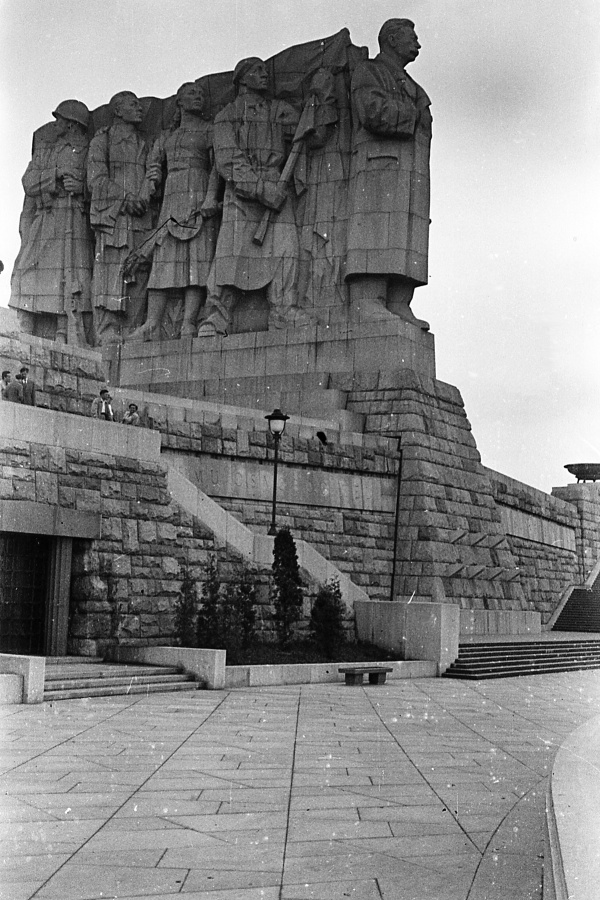
Massive Stalin statue in Prague

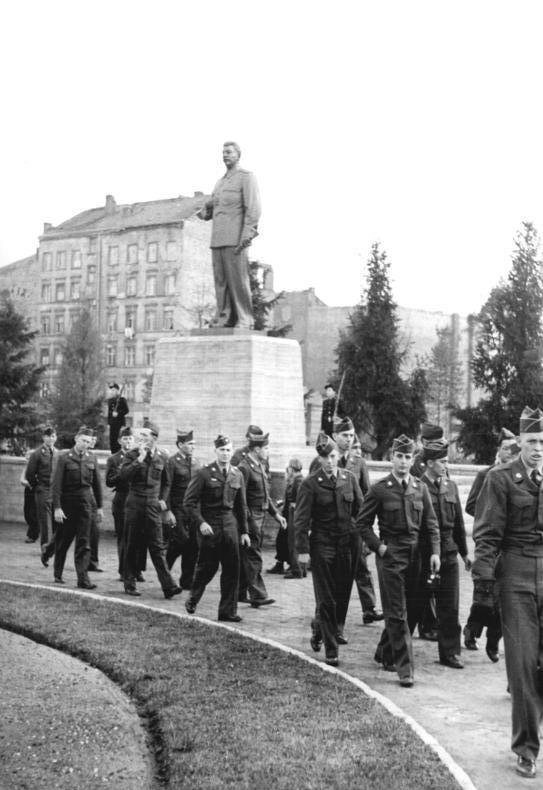
Statue of Stalin in Stalinallee, Berlin, Germany.

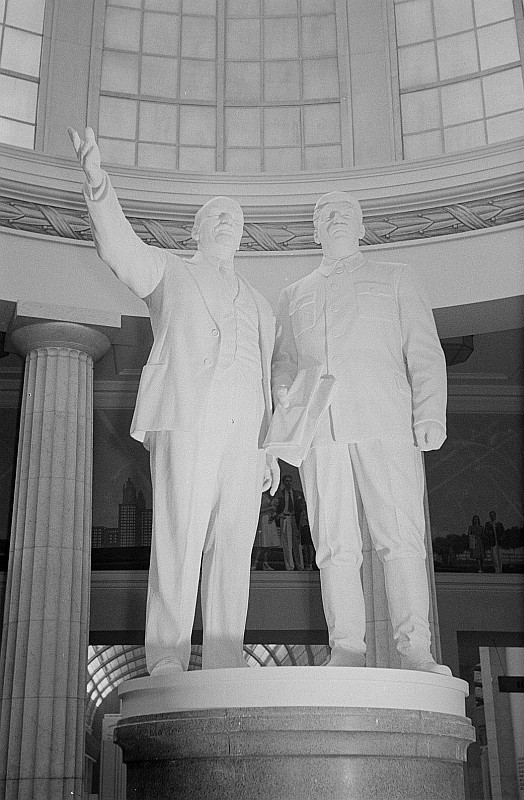
Statue of Vladimir Lenin and Stalin at the Leipzig Trade Fair of 1954.

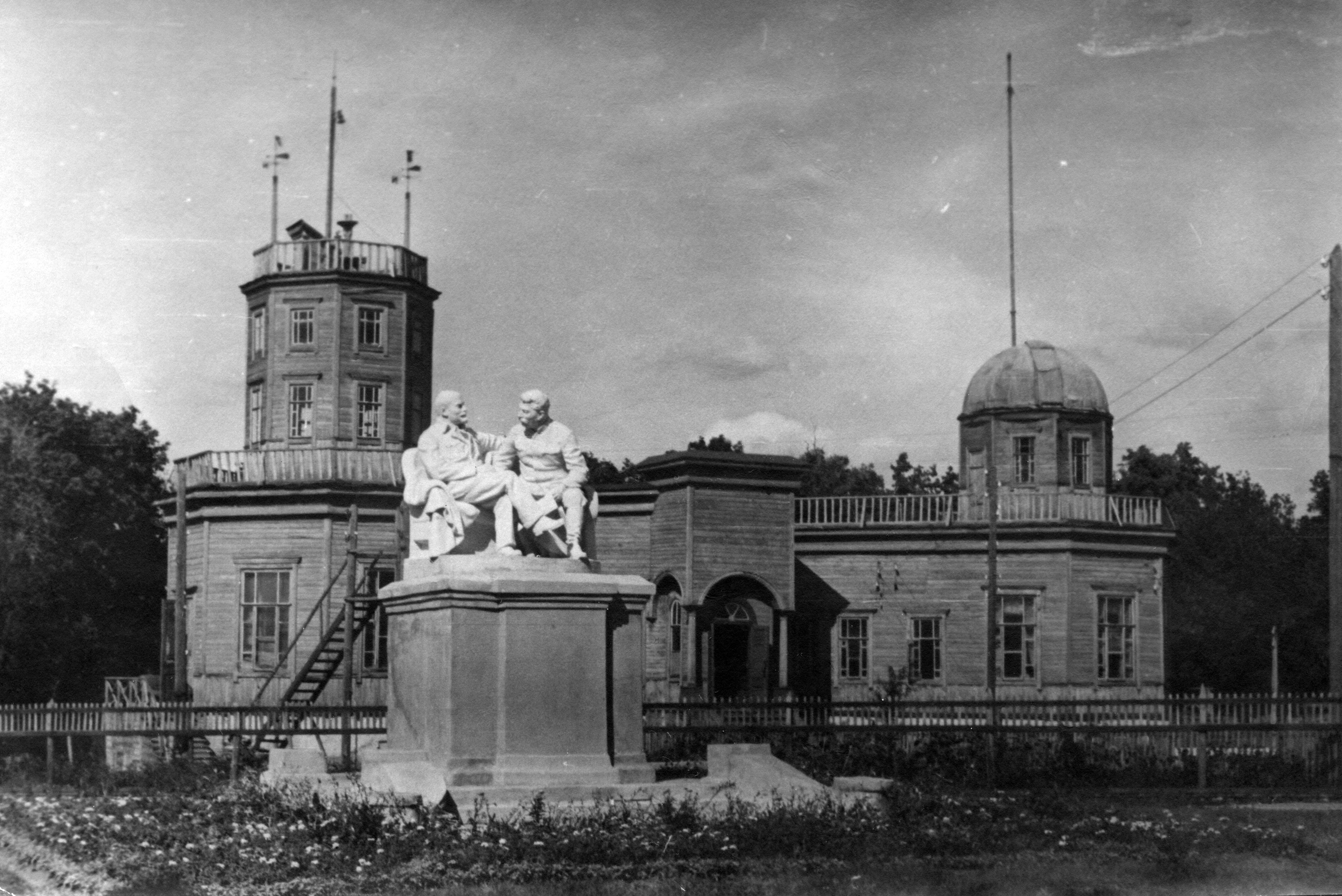
Penza, 1954. Lenin & Stalin near Penza Planetarium

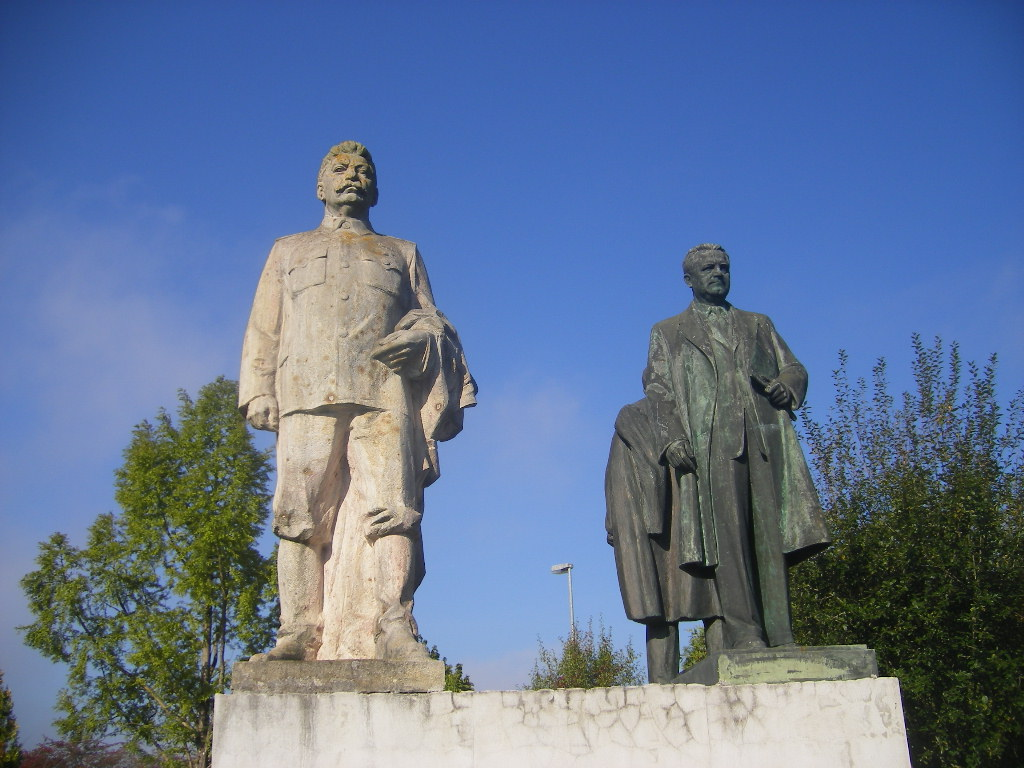
Statue of Stalin and Klement Gottwald at the Gundelfingen stone-cutting company.

This is a list of former and current known monuments dedicated to Joseph Stalin, many having been removed as a result of de-Stalinization. Some are now in Fallen Monument Park. Also, his name was removed from places, buildings, and the state anthem, and his mummified body was removed from the Lenin Mausoleum and buried in the Kremlin Wall Necropolis.

== Albania ==
- A statue of Joseph Stalin stood in Tirana but was taken down in December 1990.
- A large statue of Stalin, along with one of Lenin, can be found in the front of Mehmet Shehu's house front yard and seen from the outside. It was at first behind the Art Museum in Tirana up until the start of the museum's renovation. Before that its original location was at the end of Stalin Boulevard.

== Armenia ==
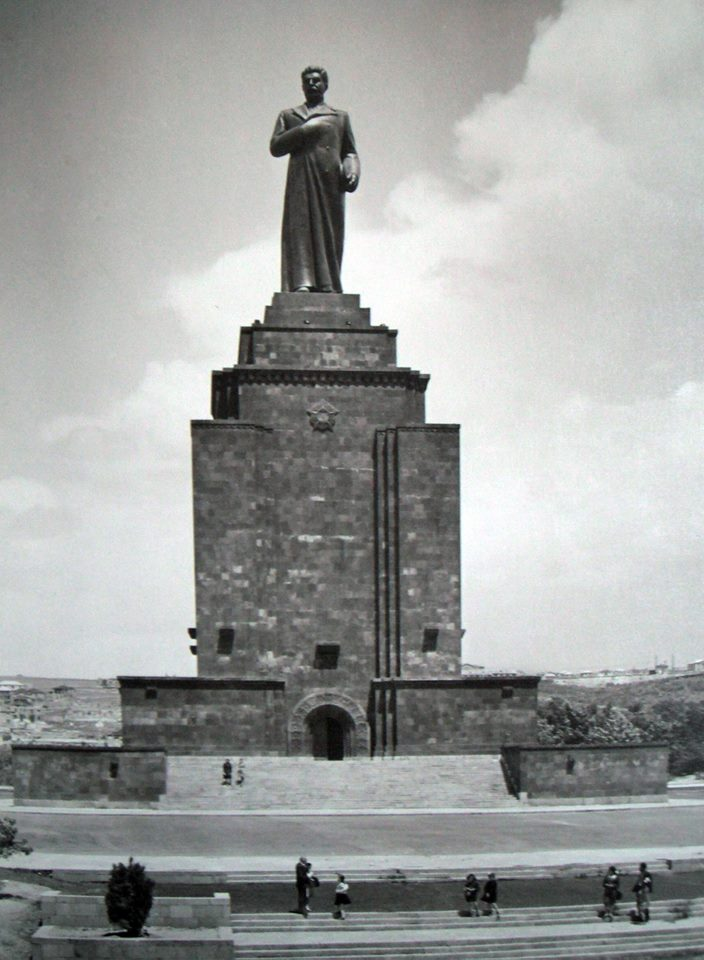
Stalin statue in Yerevan

- From November 1950 until spring 1962, a huge Stalin statue was located in Yerevan. It was replaced in 1967 by Mother Armenia.

== China ==
- A statue of Stalin in Stalin Park, Harbin.

== Czech Republic ==
- In Olomouc.
- A massive granite statue of Stalin, the largest depiction of Stalin, stood in Letná Park, Prague from 1955 to 1962.

== Germany ==
- A large statue of Stalin raising his right hand was in Riesa.
- A statue of Stalin stood in East Berlin's Stalinallee, 1951–61.

== Georgia ==
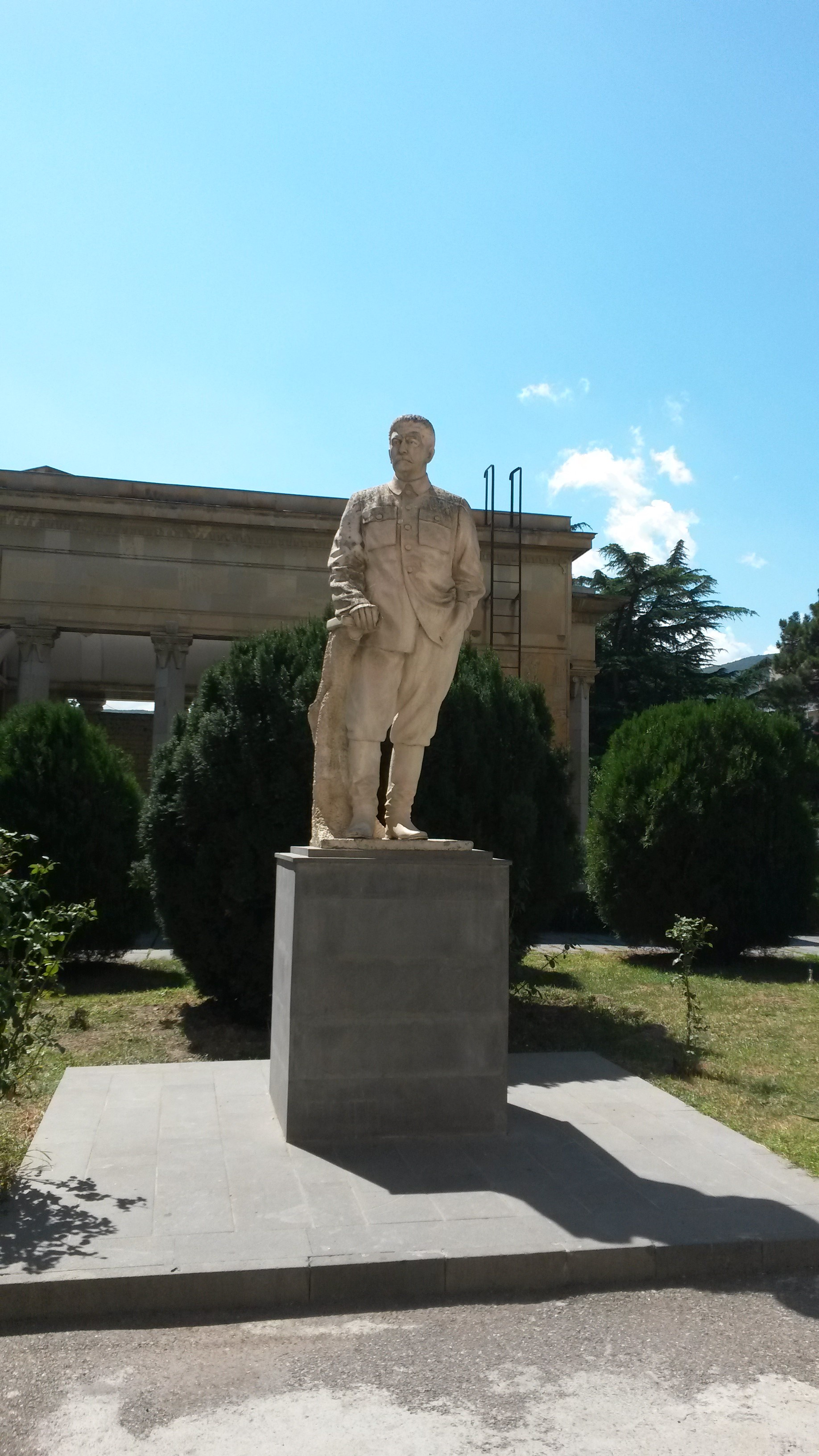
Stalin statue in front of the Joseph Stalin Museum in Gori, Georgia

- Small bust in front of the Batumi Stalin Museum.
- A statue of Stalin stood at the town hall in Gori until it was taken down in June 2010.
- A Bust and a statue of Stalin was displayed in the Joseph Stalin Museum in Gori, but it was destroyed.
- A statue of Stalin is still displayed in the Joseph Stalin Museum in Gori.
- A silver statue of Stalin still exists in Shovi.
- A gold statue of Stalin exists in Tsromi.
- A statue exists in the village of Varani, Gori.
- A statue exists near the village Sasashi 42.80454°N 42.97124°E.
- A statue stands in the town of Tianeti, Mtskheta-Mtianeti.

== Hungary ==
- Former Stalin Monument at the edge of Városliget in Budapest torn down in 1956.

== Lithuania ==
- In Grūtas Park.

== Mongolia ==
- A statue of Stalin stands at Isimuss Club in Ulaanbaatar.
- A statue of Stalin stood at front of the National Library of Mongolia until 1991. It was replaced by a statue of Byambyn Rinchen.

== The Netherlands ==
- A statue of Stalin waist-deep in a pond, it is part of a bigger artwork called "Spitting leaders" (Fernando Sánchez Castillo, 2008) in Presikhaaf Park, Arnhem. The artwork depicts four statues: Stalin, Francisco Franco, Louis XIV, and Adolf Hitler. they spit water on each other's faces. Not only are they mocked by the artist, but they mock each other.

== Poland ==
- An Ustrzyki Dolne statue 1951–56. As the result of the 1951 Polish–Soviet territorial exchange Poland obtained Ustrzyki Dolne, where Stalin's statue existed. The statue was unpopular, dressed, decorated with sausages or a broom and finally removed in 1956.
- Kraków – with Vladimir Lenin, in Strzelecki Park, removed in 1957

== Romania ==
- A statue of Stalin stood at the entrance of Parcul I. V. Stalin (now renamed Parcul Herăstrău) in Bucharest but was torn down sometime between 1959 and 1965, during the De-Stalinization in Romania.
- A statue was located in front of the Central Party Committee Building (today the Prefecture) in Brașov but was torn down sometime between 1959 and 1965 during the De-Stalinization in Romania.
- A statue by Márton Izsák, located in the city center in Târgu Mureș, was torn down in 1962 during the De-Stalinization in Romania

== Russia ==
- Many statues can be found at Fallen Monument Park, Moscow.
- Bust at his tomb in the Kremlin Wall Necropolis, Moscow.
- Bust in the Museum of the Great Patriotic War, Moscow.
- Statue of Stalin along with Franklin Roosevelt and Winston Churchill at the All-Russia Exhibition Center, Moscow.
- A large Stalin statue stood at the All-Russia Exhibition Center until 1948.
- A statue of Stalin was unveiled in Taganskaya metro station, Moscow in 2025 to replace an earlier monument that stood from 1950–1966.
- A large statue of Stalin (created in 1952 by sculptor E.V. Vuchetich) stood in a southern suburb of Volgograd until 1961. A huge statue of Lenin, created by the same sculptor, was set up in the same spot and on the same base in 1972.
- A bust stands at the Memorial of Glory in Vladikavkaz.
- A bust stands at School No. 2 in Ardon, North Ossetia.
- There is a bust of Stalin in the Communist Party's regional headquarters in Bryansk.
- A bust of Stalin is in Kizel.
- A statue in Nogir, North Ossetia–Alania.
- A bust of Stalin in the village of Chokh, Dagestan (42.319722, 47.031167).
- A bust of Stalin at a square in Derbent, Dagestan (42.054718, 48.310115).
- A bust of Stalin in the town of Dagestanskiye Ogni, Dagestan (until 2021).
- Bust of Stalin near the Battle of Stalingrad Museum alongside those of Georgy Zhukov and Alexander Vasilevsky.

== Tajikistan ==
- A Stalin statue stands at a nursery school in Asht.

== Ukraine ==
- A bust of Stalin was formerly exhibited in front of the Communist Party of Ukraine's headquarters in Zaporizhzhia in 2010. Destroyed in January 2011 by explosion.
- Last known statue of Stalin is on the road into Chernobyl.

== United States ==
- A bust of Stalin was erected at the National D-Day Memorial in Bedford, Virginia in 2010, but after controversy was soon removed for a planned relocation on the site. It had not reappeared as of January 2025.

== See also ==
- Stalinist Architecture
- De-Stalinization
- Stalin's cult of personality
- List of statues of Lenin
- List of places named after Stalin
- List of statues of Heydar Aliyev
- Chiang Kai-shek statues
