= Aschersoniodoxa =

Scientific classification
- Kingdom: Plantae
- Clade: Tracheophytes
- Clade: Angiosperms
- Clade: Eudicots
- Clade: Rosids
- Order: Brassicales
- Family: Brassicaceae
- Genus: Aschersoniodoxa; Gilg & Muschl.

Genus of flowering plants

Aschersoniodoxa is a genus of flowering plants belonging to the family Brassicaceae.

== Description ==
Aschersoniodoxa are perennial herbs.

== Distribution ==
Its native range is Peru to Northwestern Argentina.

== Species ==
List of species that are currently accepted in the Plants of the World Online database:

- Aschersoniodoxa cachensis (Speg.) Al-Shehbaz
- Aschersoniodoxa mandoniana (Wedd.) Gilg & Muschl.
- Aschersoniodoxa pilosa Al-Shehbaz

=== Formerly placed here ===
- Gongylis peruviana (Al-Shehbaz, Ed.Navarro & A.Cano) Sánchez Och. & Molinari (as Aschersoniodoxa peruviana Al-Shehbaz, Ed.Navarro & A.Cano)
