= Ernst Benkard =

German art historian

Ernst Benkard (27 February 1883 – 8 May 1946) was a German art historian and private lecturer.

== Biography ==
Born in Frankfurt, Benkard attended a grammar school, then studied art history and obtained his doctorate in 1907.

Among other things he worked as a correspondent and art critic for the Frankfurter Zeitung. From the winter semester 1927/28 to the winter semester 1937/38, he was employed at the Kunstgeschichtliches Institut der Johann-Wolfgang-Goethe-Universität Frankfurt am Main, where he mainly offered classes on regional art as well as events on Italian Renaissance. He is said to have reported on the 1937 Große Deutsche Kunstausstellung with "barely concealed irony, distance, and rejection."

Benkard's works include an illustrated book on the death masks of statesmen and artists, which was published in Berlin in 1926 with a foreword by Georg Kolbe. It bears the title Das ewige Antlitz (The Eternal Face) and immediately triggered a dispute with Ernst Gundolf about a death mask of William Shakespeare. In Das ewige Antlitz, Benkard also introduced L'Inconnue de la Seine, about which he poetically wrote that she is for us "a tender butterfly, which, carefreely elated, has fluttered and scorched its fine wings before time at the lamp of life". Another temporarily popular work of art, allegedly based on a death mask, was the Luther in effigie in Halle, which Benkard described as a "mannequin" and a "doll".

Benkard died in Freiburg im Breisgau.
