= Ethics of Political Commemoration =

The Ethics of Political Commemoration is a framework that seeks to improve remembrance of the past, so that it contributes to a better future. As a moral framework, it is adapted from the Just War tradition, reflecting that remembrance is often conducted with political – and sometimes coercive – intent. Examples of such remembrance includes public events, monuments, museums, street names, among many others.

The framework consists of eight criteria, organized under two subheadings, similar to the Just War theory. These criteria examine questions of merit and restraint when remembrance is mobilized for political purposes. The key idea of the framework is that ethical consideration of the Politics of memory needs to take multiple criteria into account.

== Ius ad Memoriam ==
The Ius ad Memoriam considerations consist of four criteria, that closely mirror the Jus ad bellum criteria of the just war tradition.

- Just Cause. Commemoration should look to memorialize that which is significant and most in need of redress. It does not need to establish a grievance in absolute terms.
- Right Intention. Commemoration is an ethical undertaking if it contributes to a better future -- and much less so if it seeks to gain advantage over others.
- Reasonable Chance of Success. Commemoration becomes unethical if it creates cycles of violence. This gives a special role to empirical social research, to understand the impact of planned commemoration on conflict and its transformation.
- Legitimate Authority. Commemoration should speak for the experience of wider society in a compassionate way, rather than being used by elite groups to strengthen their authority over society.

== Ius in Memoria ==
The Ius in Memoria are akin to Ius in Bello, in focusing more on the "how" of commemoration. It has four criteria:

- Transcend the Collectives. Commemoration is seen as ethical if it encourages people to treat each other as individuals rather than group representatives.
- Exit Circular Narratives. Commemoration should help people exit narratives that trap them in debilitating interpretative loops.
- Assert Moral Autonomy. Groups should justify their actions in universal terms, rather than excusing transgressions with reference to what others have done.
- Contained Unfathomability. Good commemoration should be precise with dates, locations and names to tether past trauma. Numerical aspects of trauma should typically be communicated in broad categories.

Proponents of the approach argue that taken together, the framework can constitute a comprehensive ethical approach or paradigm for commemoration. They concede that critiques of the just war tradition also apply to this moral framework, in that both pacifist and realist/revolutionary alternatives retain their validity.

== Applications ==
The framework has been applied to a number of cases in various publications, including the Brijuni Museum to Tito; the Stalin Museum in Gori, Georgia; the Bolnisi Museum; the Cascade Memorial in Yerevan; the W. G. Sebald path in Wertach; and the argument has been put forward that the framework can be used also for healthcare institutions that have to deal with legacies of trauma.

In 2023, Mehdi Bchir and David Wood argued that the framework could help "foster a vision for the future" for Libya.

== Origin ==
The framework was first presented at a seminar at Seton Hall University on April 15, 2021. The Ethics of Political Commemoration was also presented at Chatham House in October 2021. Subsequent publications set out the approach in more detail. The core of the framework was developed by Hans Gutbrod, a researcher based at Ilia State University. David Wood, who teaches at Seton Hall University, developed the application of the framework to conflict transformation.
