= L'Inconnue de la Seine =

19th-century anonymous woman famous for her death mask

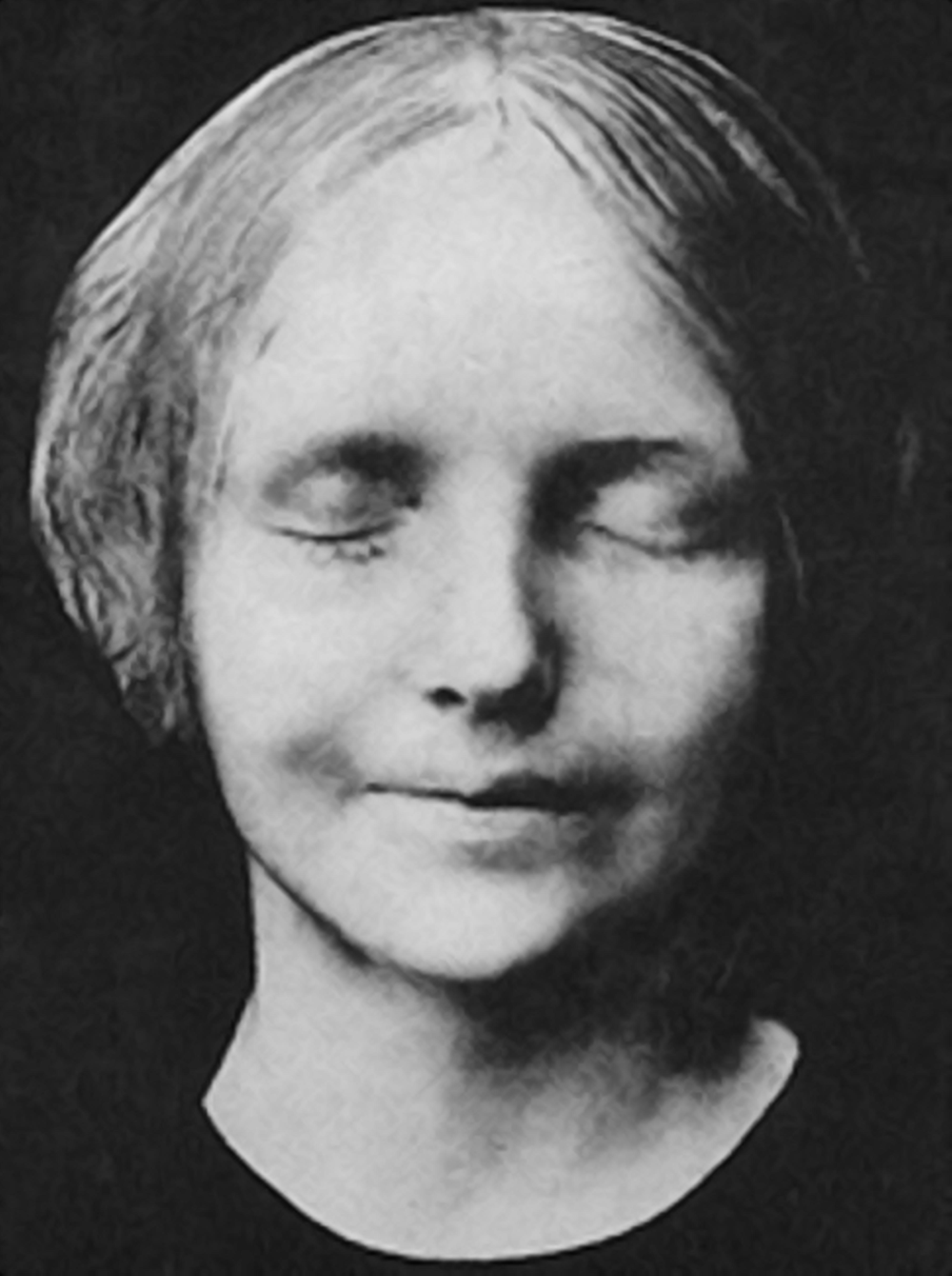
- Died: 19th century Paris
- Body discovered: 1880s
- Other name: La Belle Italienne
- Known for: Putative death mask

L'Inconnue de la Seine (lit. 'The Unknown Woman of the Seine') was an unidentified young woman whose putative death mask became a popular fixture on the walls of artists' homes after 1900. Her visage inspired numerous literary works. In the United States, the mask is commonly known as La Belle Italienne.

== History ==
According to an oft-repeated story, the body of the young woman was pulled out of the River Seine at the Quai du Louvre in Paris around the late 1880s. Since the body showed no signs of violence, suicide was suspected. A pathologist at the Paris Morgue was, according to the story, so taken by her beauty that he felt compelled to make a wax plaster cast death mask of her face. It has been questioned whether the expression of the face could belong to a drowned person.

According to the draughtsman Georges Villa, who received this information from his master, the painter Jules Joseph Lefebvre, the impression was taken from the face of a young model who died of tuberculosis around 1875, but no trace of the original cast remained. According to other accounts, the mask was taken from the daughter of a mask manufacturer in Germany. The identity of the girl was never discovered. Claire Forestier estimated the age of the model at no more than 16, given the firmness of the skin.

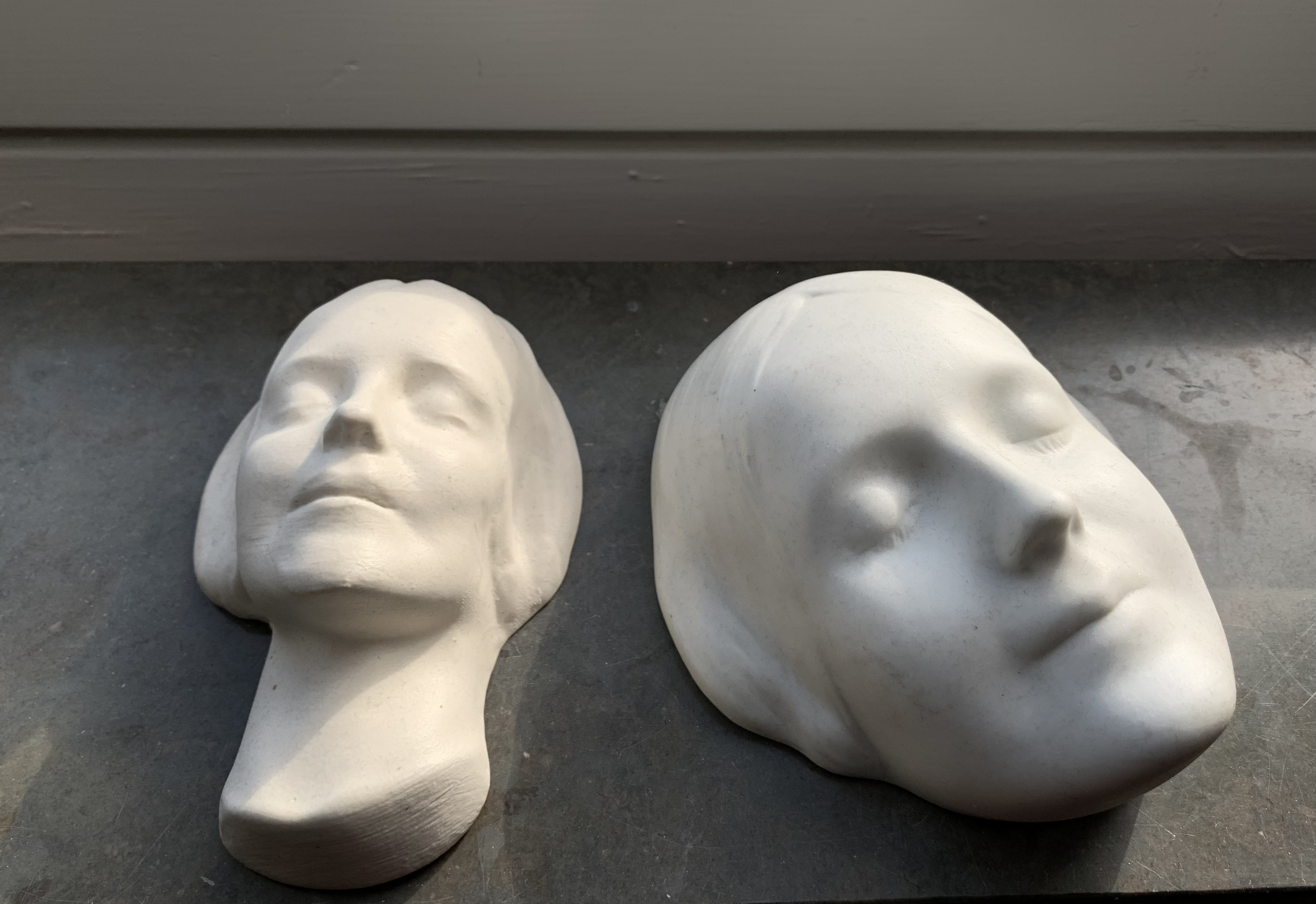
Two examples of 20th-century cast

In the following years, numerous copies were produced. The copies quickly became a fashionable, albeit morbid, fixture in Parisian Bohemian society. Albert Camus and others compared her enigmatic smile to that of the Mona Lisa, evoking much speculation as to what clues the seemingly happy expression, perceived as eerily serene, on her face could offer about her life, her death, and her place in society. The popularity of the figure is of interest to the history of artistic media, relating to its widespread reproduction. The original cast had been photographed, and new casts were created from the film negatives. These new casts displayed details that are usually lost in bodies taken from the water, but the apparent preservation of these details in the face of the cast seemed to only reinforce its authenticity. Moreover, she became famous for being used for decades for mouth-to-mouth resuscitation dummies.

Critic Al Alvarez wrote in his book on suicide The Savage God: "I am told that a whole generation of German girls modeled their looks on her." According to Hans Hesse of the University of Sussex, Alvarez reports, "the Inconnue became the erotic ideal of the period, as Bardot was for the 1950s. He thinks that German actresses such as Elisabeth Bergner modeled themselves on her. She was finally displaced as a paradigm by Greta Garbo." As of 2017, a workshop called L'Atelier Lorenzi in Arcueil made plaster death masks from a 19th-century mold, which is said to be that of L'Inconnue de la Seine.

== Artistic portrayals ==
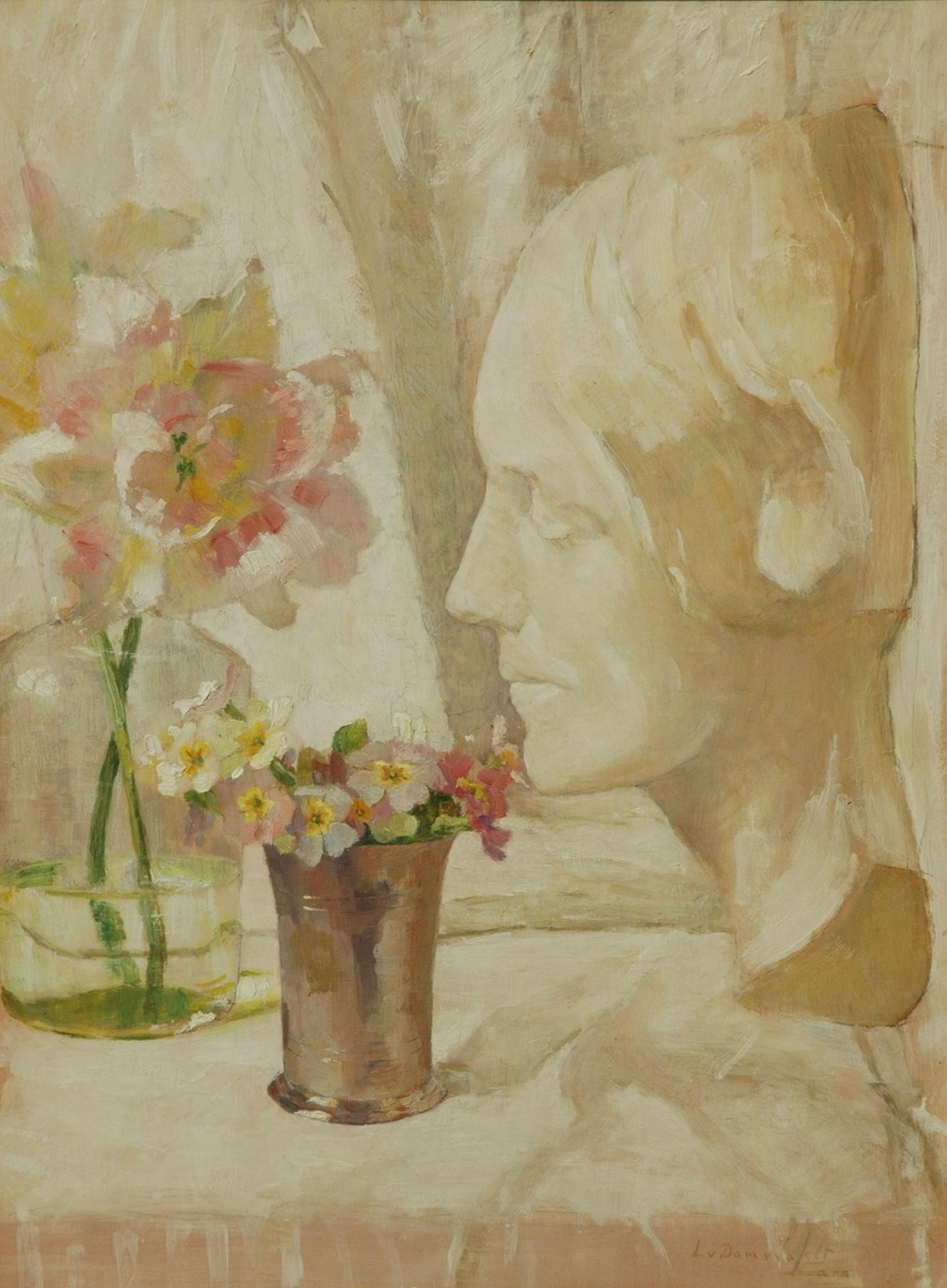
Portrait by the Dutch painter Lucie van Dam van Isselt, 1914

=== English literature ===
The earliest mention can be found in Richard Le Gallienne's 1900 novella The Worshipper of the Image, in which an English poet falls in love with the mask, eventually leading to the death of his daughter and the suicide of his wife. An image of L'Inconnue was used on the cover illustration for the family history mystery novel A Habit of Dying by DJ Wiseman. L'Inconnue is referenced in William Gaddis's 1955 novel The Recognitions. The 1942 novel My Heart for Hostage by Robert Hillyer contains a scene where the protagonist visits a Paris morgue to see if a L'Inconnue is that of his beloved.

Caitlín R. Kiernan writes about L'Inconnue as the model of Resusci Anne in her novel The Drowning Girl (2012). The story is deeply tied to the themes and images of the book. Chuck Carlise's 2016 poetry collection, In One Version of the Story, considers the many fictionalized accounts of L'Inconnue as a meditation on the ways humans confront obsession and loss by creating stories. Referenced as the origin of the CPR doll by Chuck Palahniuk in "Exodus", a story in Haunted.

Kathy Reichs' forensic anthropologist character, Temperance Brennan, discusses the L'Inconnue de la Seine case with a colleague in the 2021 crime novel The Bone Code. She is also referenced in Letters from Paris by Juliet Blackwell, who gave a speculative narrative of L'Inconnue in the form of flashbacks, lending her the name Sabine. Brooks Hansen's 2021 novel The Unknown Woman of the Seine hypothesizes the story of the young woman before her drowning. She is referenced in Jodi Picoult's novel The Book of Two Ways.

=== French literature ===
Maurice Blanchot, who owned one of the masks, described her as "a young girl with closed eyes, enlivened by a smile so relaxed and at ease ... that one could have believed that she drowned in an instant of extreme happiness". In Louis Aragon's 1944 novel Aurélien, L'Inconnue played a significant role as one of the main characters attempts to rejuvenate the mask from various photographs. In the early 1960s, Man Ray contributed photographs to a new edition of the work. In 2012, Didier Blonde wrote a novel called L'Inconnue de la Seine, about a man in Paris who stumbles upon a copy of the mask in an antiques store, and who tries to find out more about the girl it was modelled after.

=== German literature ===
The protagonist of Rainer Maria Rilke's only novel, Die Aufzeichnungen des Malte Laurids Brigge (1910), reflects:

The caster I visit every day has two masks hanging next to his door. The face of the young one who drowned, which someone copied in the morgue because it was beautiful, because it was still smiling, because its smile was so deceptive – as though it knew.

In 1926, Ernst Benkard published Das ewige Antlitz, a book about 126 death masks, writing about our subject that she is "like a delicate butterfly to us, who, carefree and exhilarated, fluttered right into the lamp of life, scorching her fine wings." Reinhold Conrad Muschler's 1934 widely translated best-selling novel, Die Unbekannte tells the maudlin story of the fate of the provincial orphan Madeleine Lavin, who has fallen in love with the British diplomat Lord Thomas Vernon Bentick and, after a romance, commits suicide in the Seine when Bentick returns to his fiancée. This novel was turned into a film of the same name in 1936. Alfred Döblin's essay, "Of Faces, Pictures, and their Truth" (German: "Von Gesichtern, Bildern, und ihrer Wahrheit"), published as an introduction to photographer August Sander's 1929 collection Face of our Time (German: Antlitz der Zeit).

Hertha Pauli's 1931 story "L'Inconnue de la Seine", which first appeared in the Berliner Tageblatt Ödön von Horváth's play based on his friend Hertha Pauli's story, written in 1934 and titled Eine Unbekannte aus der Seine. Claire Goll's 1936 short story "Die Unbekannte aus der Seine", in which the protagonist peers into a death mask and dies from a heart attack caused by delusion and guilt as he believes he recognizes the face as his daughter. Max Frisch's 1955 play Die Chinesische Mauer features L'Inconnue de la Seine as one of several historical figures. U-Boat commander Herbert Werner mentions having a copy of the cast on his wall in his parents' house in his 1968 memoir, Iron Coffins.

=== Slavic literature ===
Czech poet Vítězslav Nezval wrote the poem "Neznámá ze Seiny", inspired by the story, in 1929. Vladimir Nabokov's 1934 poem "L'Inconnue de la Seine", written in Russian, was published in Poslednie Novosti. It has been argued that this poem has as much to do with the Slavic myth of rusalka as with the mask itself.

=== Ballet ===
In 1963, Bentley Stone choreographed a version of L'Inconnue to music by Francis Poulenc for the Stone-Camryn Ballet. It premiered with a cast that included Ruth Ann Koesun and John Kriza. That ballet was moved to the American Ballet Theatre in 1965, with Koesun and Kriza reprising their roles, and with Christine Sarry taking the role of the "River Girl".

=== Film ===
Director Agnès Varda talks about L'Innconnue in her 1988 documentary Jane B. par Agnès V. where she compares Jane Birkin's desire to be famous but anonymous as the state of L'Inconnue. Used in the film The Screaming Skull, in 1958 as the image of the dead wife.

=== Music ===
"L'Inconnue" is track number four on the 2018 Beach House album, 7. German bitpop group Welle:Erdball included the track "L'Inconnue de la Seine" on their 2017 album Gaudeamus Igitur. "Rescue Annie" also tells a version of the story on Frank Turner's 2019 Album No Man's Land. The image of L'Inconnue de la Seine appears in Michael Jackson's Smooth Criminal through the character Annie. One of the most outstanding lines in the song, "Annie, are you OK?" is actually the line that CPR trainees are supposed to say while performing CPR on the Resusci Anne doll. L'Inconnue de la Seine is referenced in the song "Wake Her Up" (featuring Wisp), the seventh track on American Football's 2026 self-titled fourth album. In the song, Mike Kinsella sings about "the girl of the River Seine" and "the boy who fell in love / With the girl at the bottom of the River Seine."

=== Photography ===
Albert Rudomine made a portrait of the death mask in 1927. The blissful expression of the unknown dead girl was the inspiration for Yvonne Chevalier's 1935 recreation later titled Ophélie. Man Ray in 1966 made a series of surrealist mises-en-scène pictures of a cast, in one case placing it on a pillow in bed, and these are held in the collection of the Centre Pompidou.

=== CPR doll ===
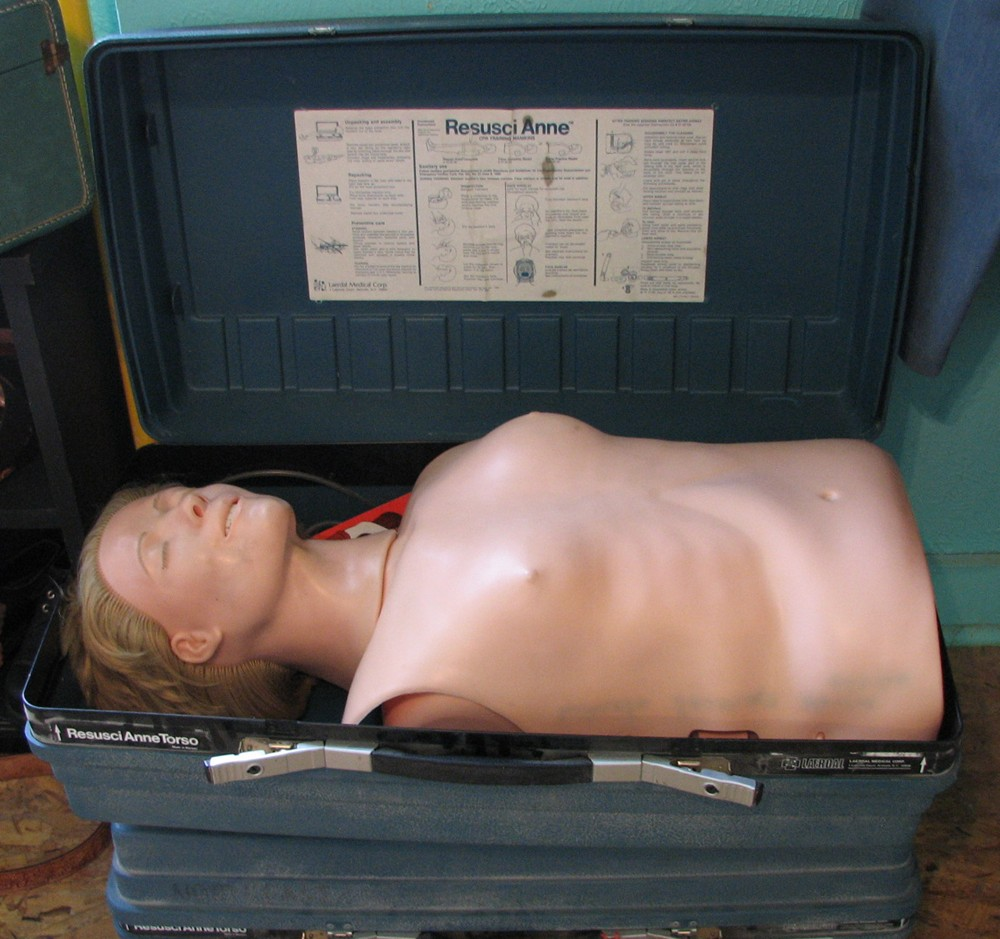
Resusci Anne mannequin torso in a storage case

The face of the unknown woman was used for the head of the first aid mannequin Resusci Anne. It was created by Peter Safar and Asmund Laerdal in 1958 and was used starting in 1960 in numerous CPR courses. For this reason, the face has been called "the most kissed face" of all time.

== See also ==
- Evelyn McHale
