= Muschleria =

Scientific classification
- Kingdom: Plantae
- Clade: Tracheophytes
- Clade: Angiosperms
- Clade: Eudicots
- Clade: Asterids
- Order: Asterales
- Family: Asteraceae
- Subfamily: Vernonioideae
- Tribe: Vernonieae
- Genus: Muschleria; S.Moore
- Species: M. angolensis

Binomial name
- Muschleria angolensis S.Moore

Genus of flowering plants

Muschleria is a monotypic genus of flowering plants in the tribe Vernonieae within the family Asteraceae. The genus is named in honour of German botanist Reinhold Conrad Muschler (1882–1957). As a monotypic genus, it contains a single species, Muschleria angolensis S.Moore, that is endemic to Angola.
