= Albert Rudomine =

French photographer

Albert Rudomine (27 April 1892 in Kiev, Russian Empire - 4 April 1975 in Paris) was a French photographer perhaps best known for his nudes.

After a time spent studying Hebrew in New York, Rudomine settled in Paris in 1917. He worked first as a dressmaker before working as a photojournalist for L'Illustration in 1920 and opening a photographic studio in 1923.

== Collections ==
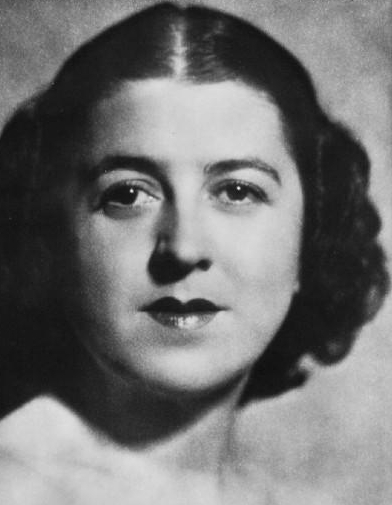
Martha Angelici Photograph by Albert Rudomine (1945)

- Collection Christian Bouqueret
- Bibliothèque nationale de France
- Cleveland Museum of Art
- J. Paul Getty Museum
- Museum of Modern Art
- Department of Image Collections, National Gallery of Art of Art Library
- Metropolitan Museum of Art
- Centre Pompidou
- Musée Carnavalet
- Musée Cantini, Marseilles
- Musée Bourdelle
- Musée des beaux-arts du Canada

== Exhibitions ==
- Albert Rudomine, Rencontres de la photographie, Arles, France, 1983
- Vente aux enchères chez Tajan, 2003
- Galerie Michèle Chomette (collective), Paris, 2004
- Galerie Léon Herschtritt (collective), Paris, 2006
- Galerie Johannes Faber, Vienne
