= Ilse Abel =

German actress (1909–1959)

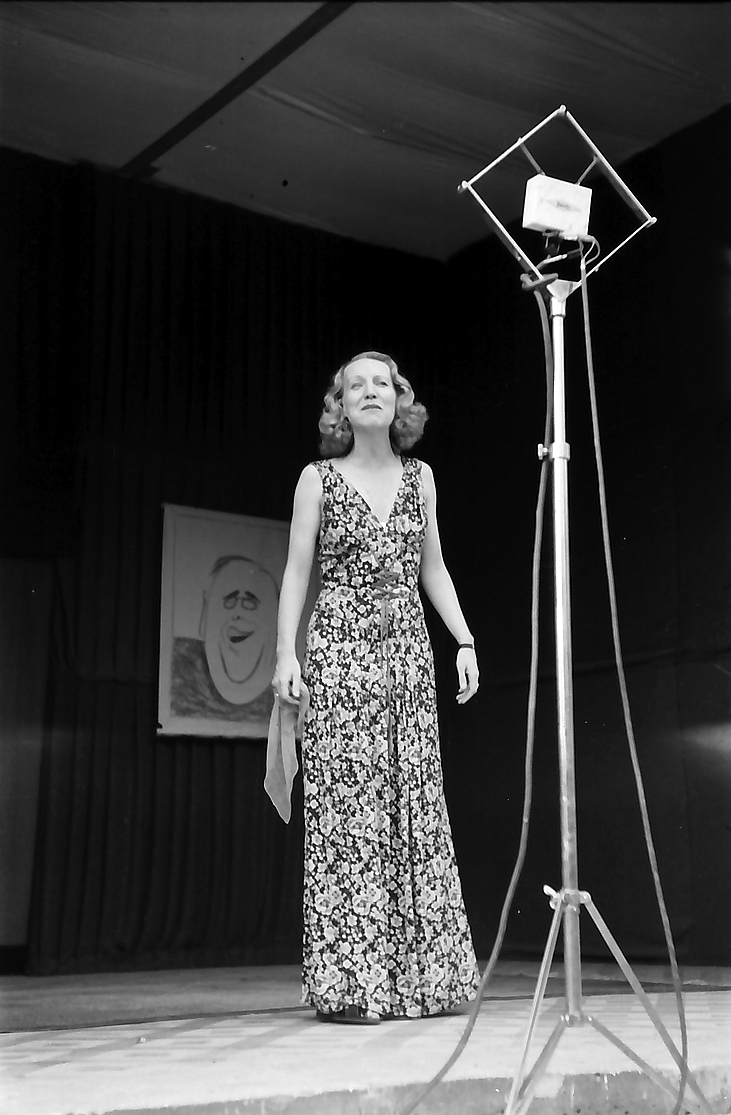
- Abel in 1942
- Born: 5 October 1909; Berlin, German Empire
- Died: 21 May 1959 (aged 49); Berlin, West Germany
- Occupation: Actress

Ilse Abel (5 October 1909 – 21 May 1959) was a German stage and film actress. (Note: The Deutsche Biographie index entry gives different dates: 5 October 1908 – 20 April 1959.) She appeared in German theatre and in a number of film roles between the 1930s and the 1950s.

== Life and career ==
Abel was born in Berlin. She trained for the stage under Anna von Strantz-Führing and Heinz Dietrich-Kentner. In 1929 she made her stage debut on the Rotter circuit as Fleurette in Blaubart, appearing with Walter Kirchhoff. She later worked with the Barnowsky theatres and toured in German provincial theatres. By the early 1930s she was engaged at the Theater am Kurfürstendamm in Berlin.

Her film appearances included Die Unbekannte and Der Favorit der Kaiserin in 1936, followed by roles in films including Monika. Eine Mutter kämpft um ihr Kind, Parkstraße 13, Angelika and Polterabend. Her later screen appearances included Mein Vater, der Schauspieler in 1956 and Die Schönste in 1957.

== Selected filmography ==
- Der Favorit der Kaiserin (1936)
- Die Unbekannte (1936)
- Monika. Eine Mutter kämpft um ihr Kind (1938)
- Parkstraße 13. Verhör um Mitternacht (1939)
- Leidenschaft (1940)
- Angelika (1940)
- Polterabend (1940)
- Mein Vater, der Schauspieler (1956)
- Die Schönste (1957)
