= Batumi Stalin Museum =

Former museum in Batumi, Georgia

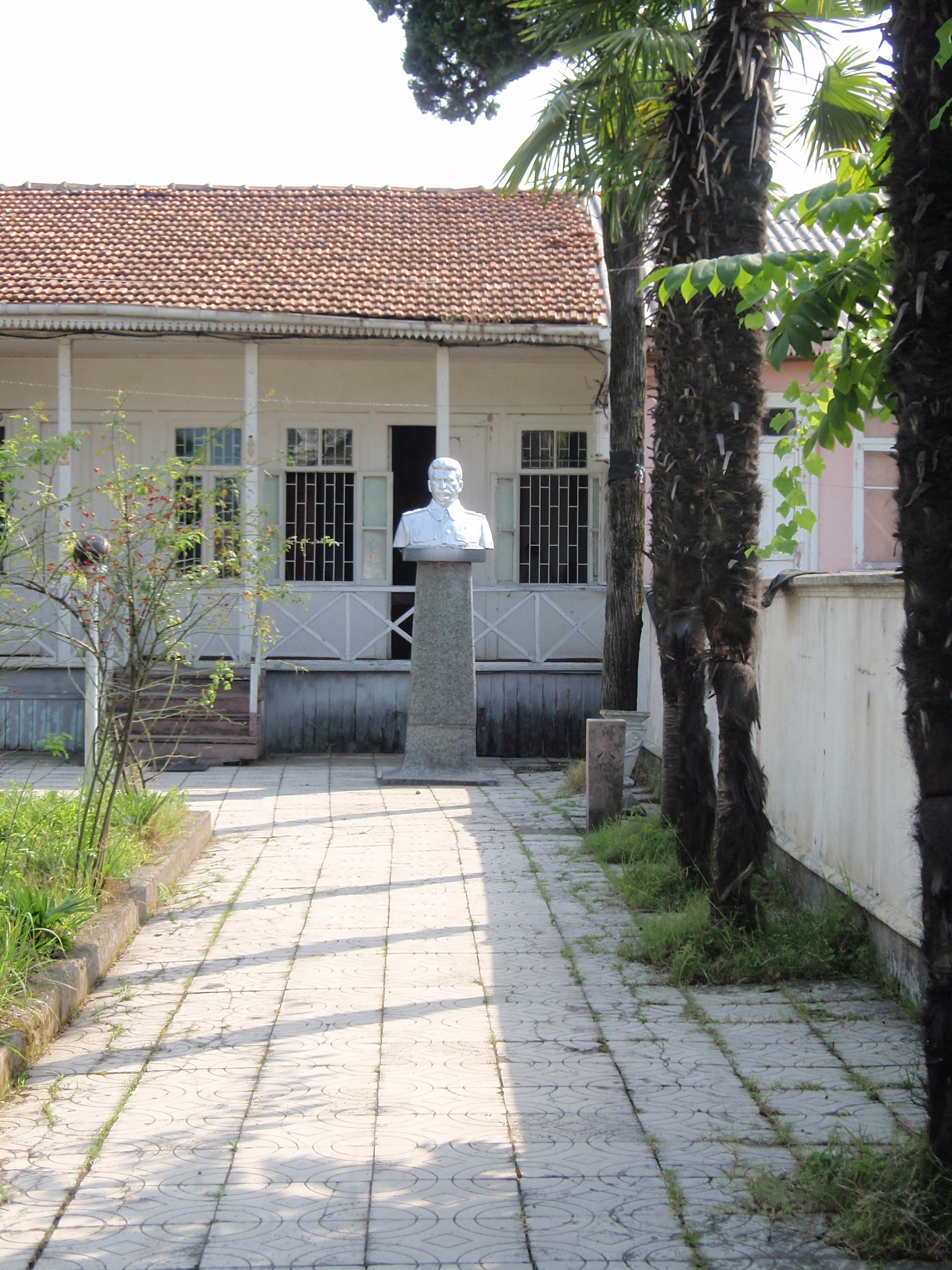
- Museum in Batumi, Georgia.

- Location within Adjara Location within Georgia
- Established: 2010
- Dissolved: 2013
- Coordinates: 41°38′35″N 41°38′45″E

Batumi Stalin Museum was a museum in Batumi, Georgia. It commemorated Joseph Stalin, who was active in socialist agitation among Batumi's refinery workers during 1901–1902. It closed in 2013, after suffering low visitation.

== See also ==
- List of museums in Georgia (country)
