= Joseph Stalin Museum =

Museum in Gori, Georgia

Coordinates: 41°59′14″N 44°06′49″E

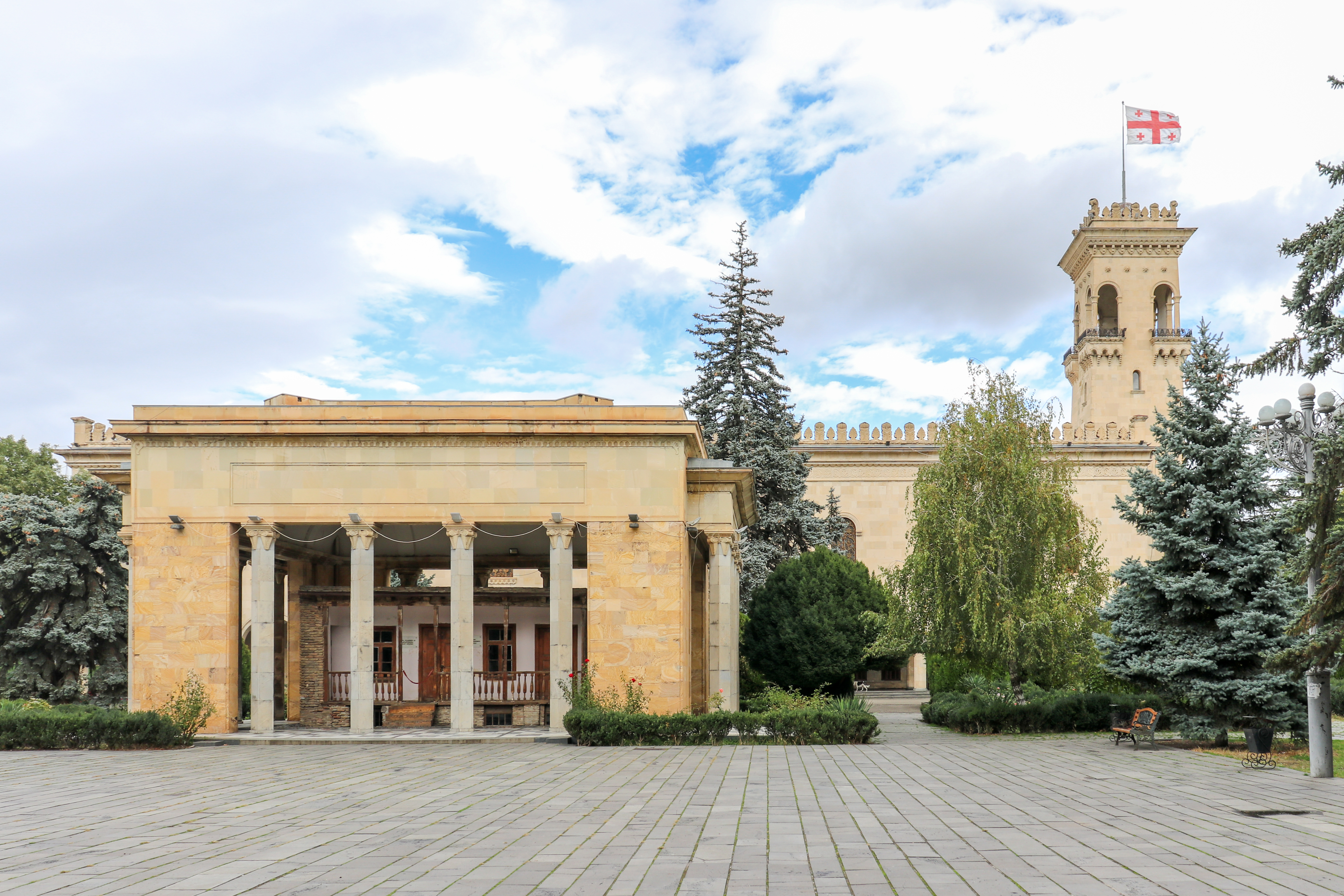
The Stalin Museum (in background), with the birthhouse of Stalin in foreground

The Joseph Stalin Museum is a museum in Gori, Georgia dedicated to the life of Joseph Stalin, the leader of the Soviet Union, who was born in Gori. The museum retains its Soviet-era characteristics.

== Organization ==
The museum has three sections, all located in the town's central square. It was officially dedicated to Stalin in 1957. With the downfall of the Soviet Union and independence movement of Georgia, the museum was closed in 1989, but has since been reopened, and is a popular tourist attraction.

=== Stalin's house ===
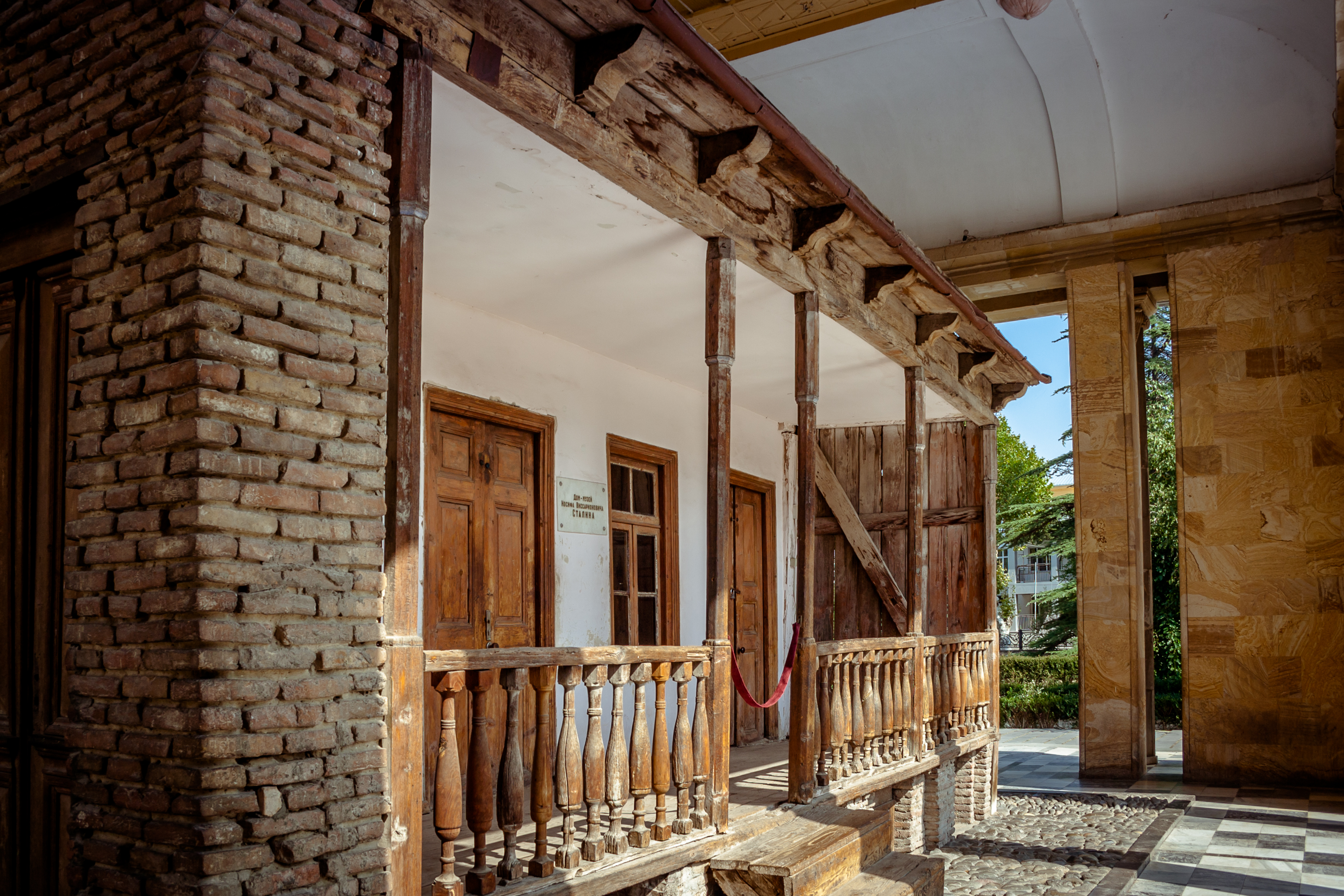
Stalin's house

Enshrined within a Greco-Italianate pavilion is a small wooden hut, in which Stalin was born in 1878 and spent his first four years. The small hut has two rooms on the ground floor. Stalin's father Vissarion Jughashvili, a local shoemaker, rented the one room on the left hand side of the building and maintained a workshop in the basement. The landlord lived in the other room. The hut originally formed part of a neighbourhood of similar dwellings, which was cleared in Soviet times to make way for more modern housing, a square, and the museum.

=== Stalin Museum ===
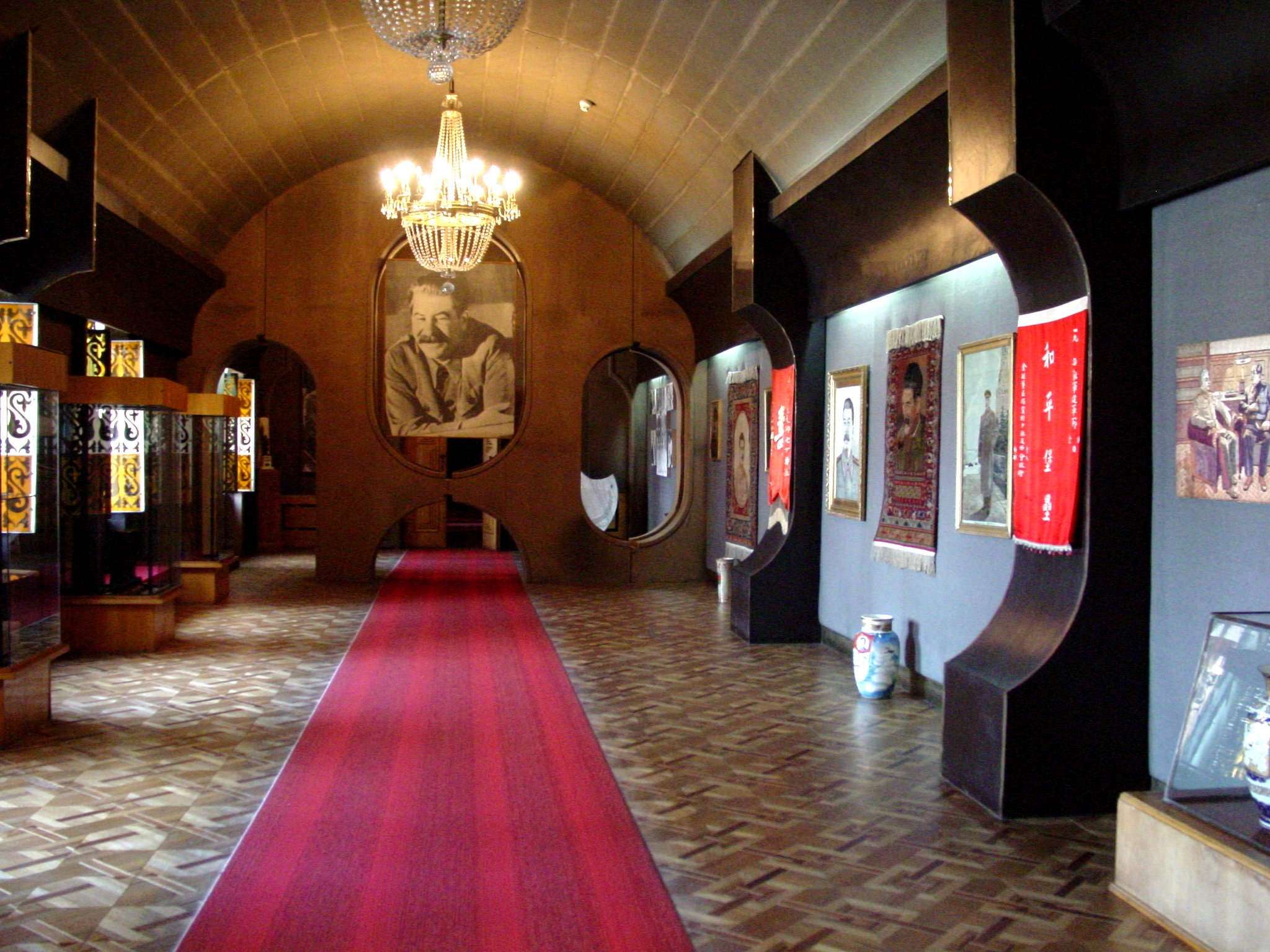
Stalin Museum

The main corpus of the complex is a large palazzo in Stalinist Gothic style, begun in 1951 ostensibly as a museum of the history of socialism, but clearly intended to become a memorial to Stalin, who died in 1953. The exhibits are divided into six halls in roughly chronological order, and contain many items actually or allegedly owned by Stalin, including some of his office furniture, his personal effects and gifts made to him over the years. There is also much illustration by way of documentation, photographs, paintings and newspaper articles. The display concludes with one of twelve copies of the death mask of Stalin taken shortly after his death.

The overall impression is that of a shrine to a secular saint.

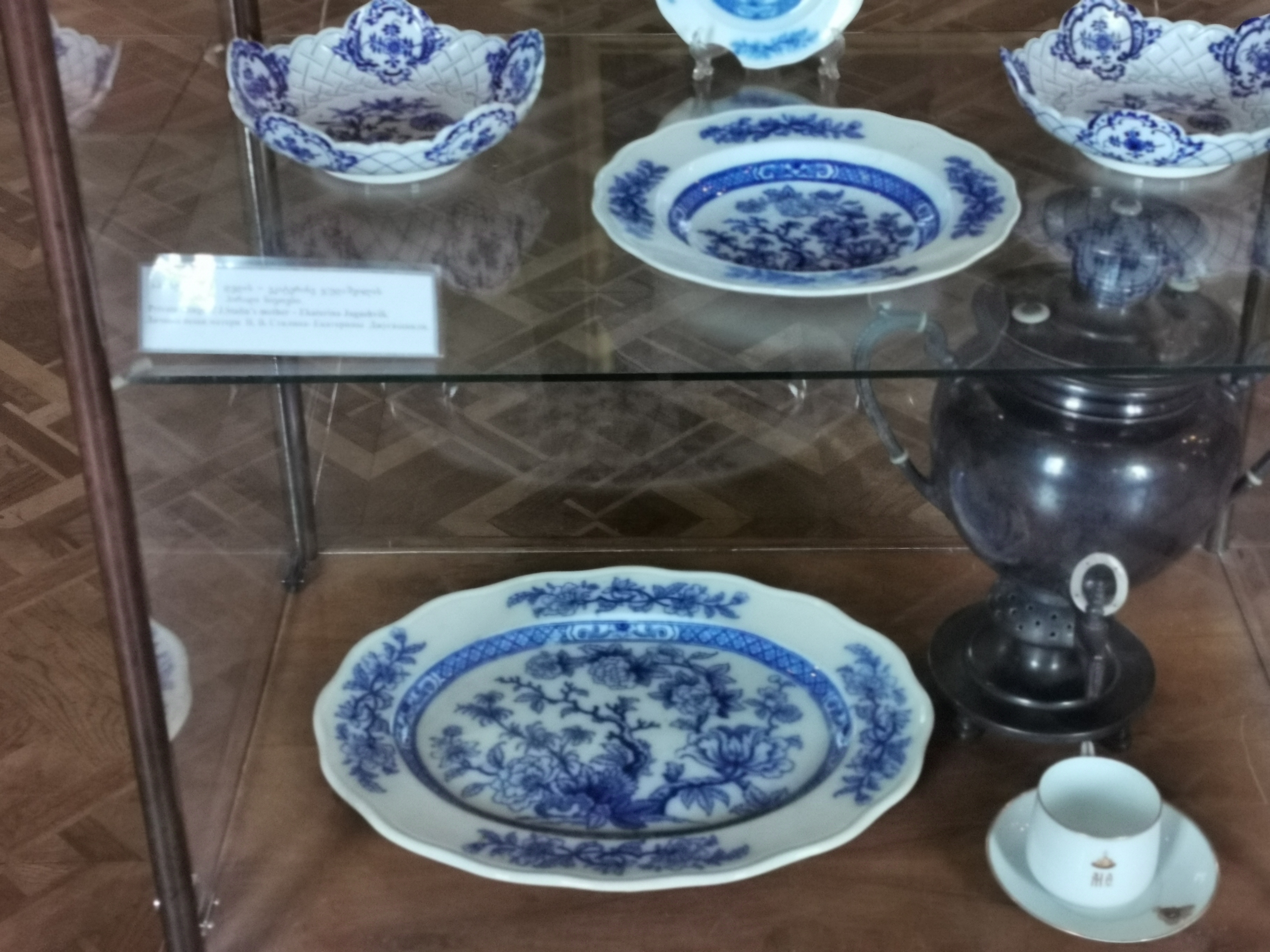

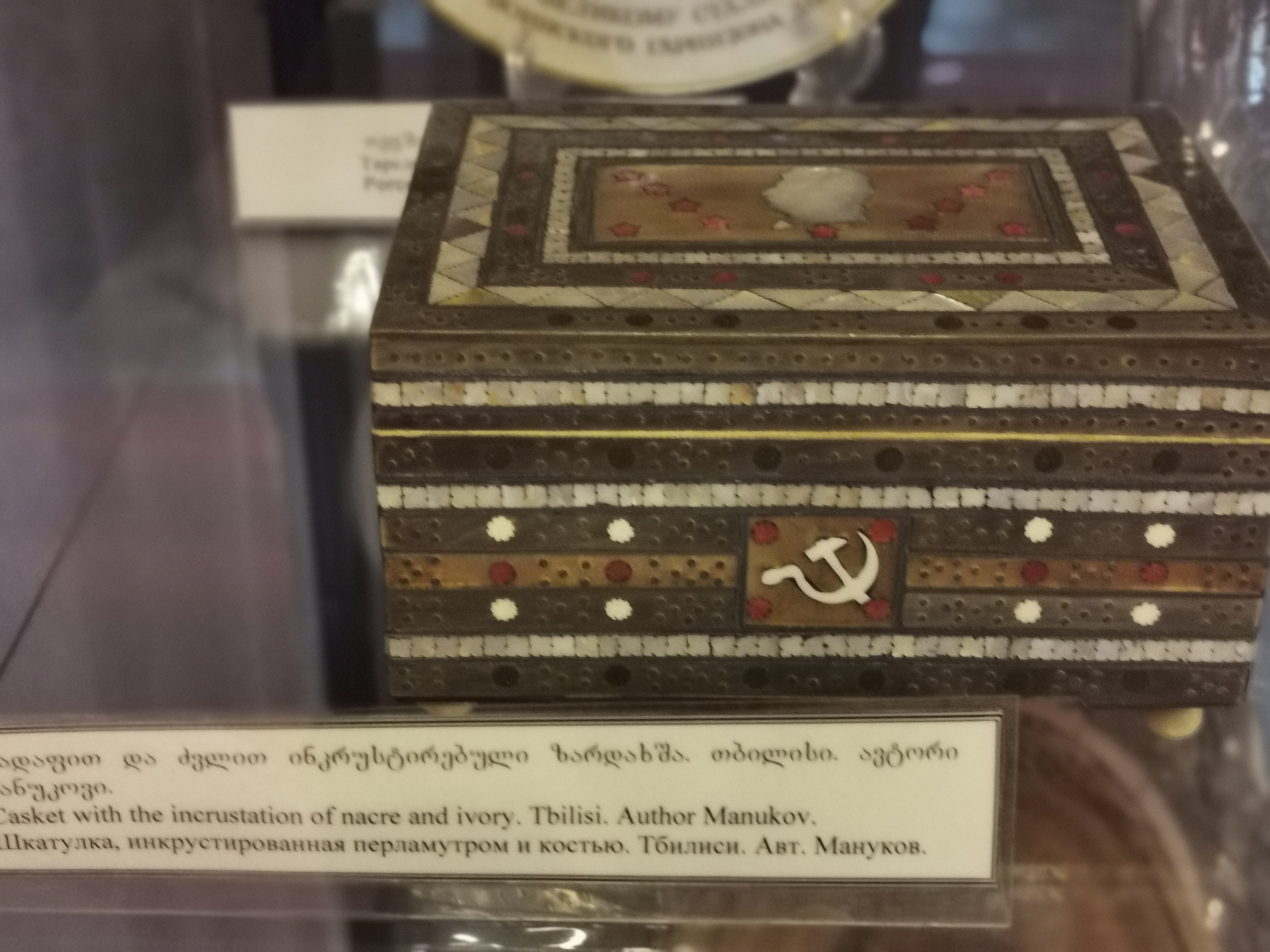

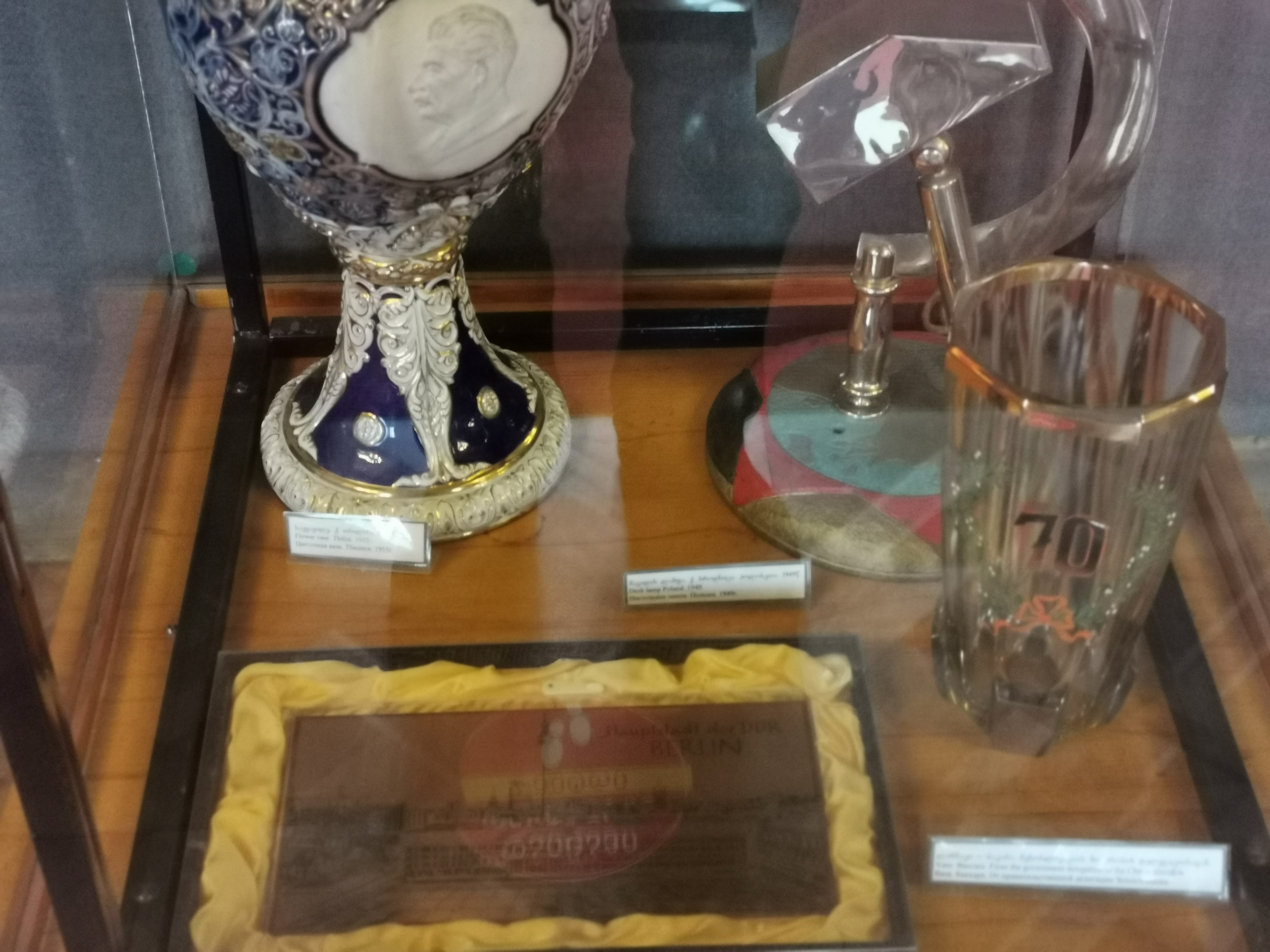

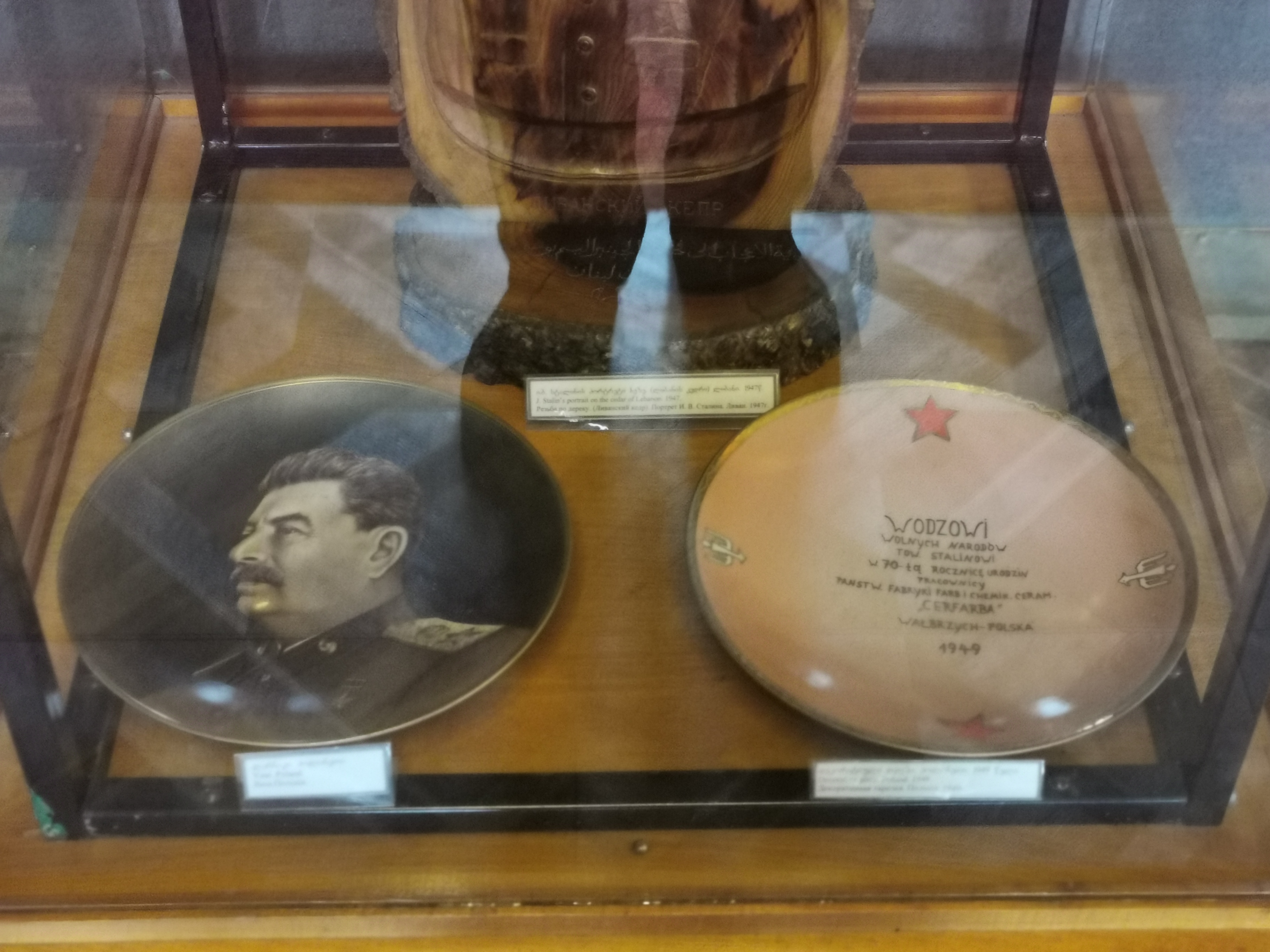

=== Stalin's railway carriage ===
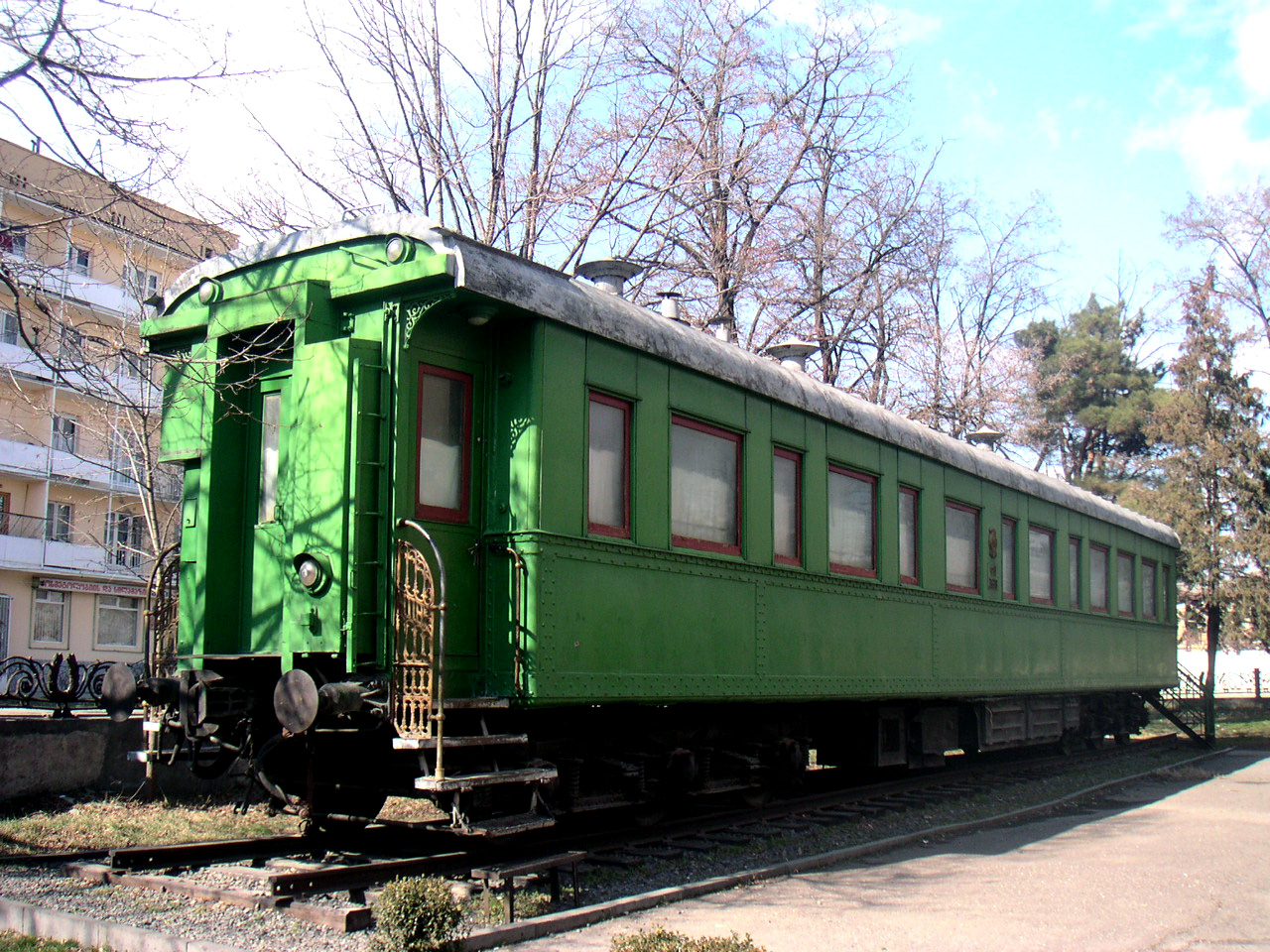
Stalin's personal railway carriage, located outside the museum

To one side of the museum is Stalin's personal railway carriage. The green Pullman carriage, which is armour plated and weighs 83 tons, was used by Stalin from 1941 onwards, including his attendances at the Yalta Conference and the Tehran Conference. It was sent to the museum on being recovered from the railway yards at Rostov-on-Don in 1985.

== Planned reorganization ==
In the aftermath of the 2008 South Ossetia war, on 24 September 2008, Georgia's Minister of Culture Nikoloz Vacheishvili announced the Stalin museum would be reorganized into the Museum of Russian Aggression in the nearest future. A banner was placed at the entrance stating: "This museum is a falsification of history. It is a typical example of Soviet propaganda and it attempts to legitimise the bloodiest regime in history." However, it was removed by 2017.

The Stalin Monument in the central square was removed on 25 June 2010 with plans to place it in the museum. On 20 December 2012, the municipal assembly of Gori voted to put an end to plans to change the museum's content.

Other suggestions for a transformation include the idea of including an "exhibition about the exhibition" to highlight the many inaccuracies and falsehoods of the original presentation, a proposal made by the historian and museum director Lasha Bakradze. Commentators have also suggested that, based on a comprehensive Ethics of Political Commemoration, the process of transforming the museum would require extensive public engagement to legitimize any eventual design.
