= Reinhold Muschler =

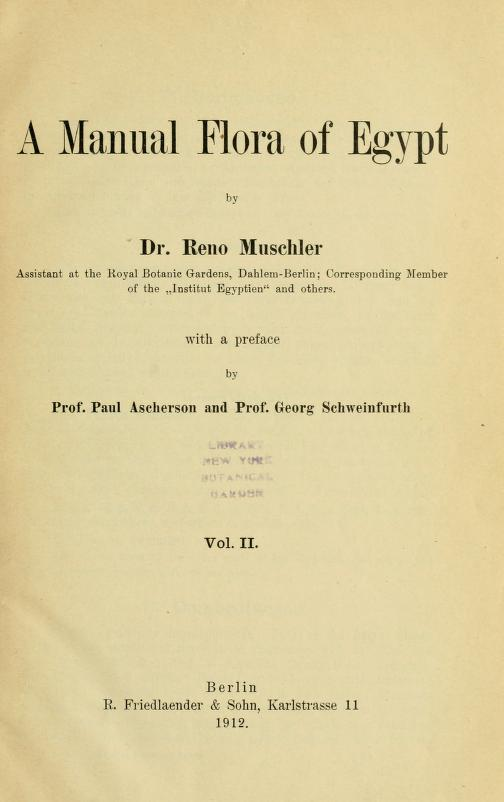

Reinhold Conrad Muschler aka Reno Muschler (9 August 1882 Berlin – 10 December 1957 Berlin), was a German botanist, explorer and writer, who worked on the taxonomy of North African flora. He travelled extensively with Ernest Friedrich Gilg (1867–1933) and carried out a revision of the flora of Patagonia. His parents were both well-known singers at the Court Opera in Berlin.

After finishing high school in Berlin, he travelled widely in Europe and Africa, spending the winters of 1902–1906 in Egypt after he was found to be suffering from TB. It was during these rest-cures that he met Georg Schweinfurth and Paul Ascherson, who encouraged him to become involved in the botany of Egypt. Consequently, he studied under Adolf Engler, receiving his doctorate on African Senecio species in 1908, and becoming an assistant at the Royal Botanic Gardens, Dahlem-Berlin. Between 1906 and 1914 he authored and co-authored some 65 botanical papers, describing 10 new genera, 380 new species and about 50 new combinations.

Irregularities in the Manual Flora of Egypt led to Schweinfurth and Engler accusing him of fraud and the matter being taken to court. The case against Muschler was dismissed on the grounds of his being mentally disturbed at the time. Even so, the scandal led to his leaving the Royal Botanic Gardens of Berlin in September 1913. A 2001 paper by Olof Ryding notes that the 1913 publication by Luigi Buscalioni and Muschler on plants supposedly collected by the Duchess of Aosta is highly suspect in respect of the specimens' provenance and collector. Many of these doubtful specimens are now believed to have been collected by Schweinfurth in Eritrea and Yemen. A large number of Muschler's type specimens were destroyed by World War I and European botanists, excited by the fuss, had a field day examining his specimens, descriptions and drawings and making precipitate judgements about their validity in terms of the rules of nomenclature. Weighing the irregularities Ryding argued that many of Muschler's names and descriptions of the types in the Egyptian Flora should stand.

During the War Muschler stayed in Egypt and on his return to Germany became a noted writer and music critic. He wrote "Egyptian Travel Sketches" in 1915, biographies of Frederick the Great, Richard Strauss and Philipp zu Eulenburg, and many novels in which he glorified love as a form of religion.

Muschler was living at 23a Fürstenstrasse, Berlin at the time of his death. His grave is at the Waldfriedhof Zehlendorf.

The Angolan composite genus of Muschleria was created by Spencer Le Marchant Moore in 1914 to honour Muschler.

== Botanical Works ==
- 1909 - Ernest Friedrich Gilg, RC Muschler. Phanerogamen. Blütenpflanzen. Ed. Leipzig, Quelle & Meyer. 53 ill. 172 pp.
- 1912 - A Manual Flora of Egypt. 2 vols. 421 pp, Alphabetical list of Arabian names of plants Append. VII

== Novels ==
- "Douglas Webb" (1921)
- "Der lachende Tod" (1923)
- "Komödie des Lebens" (Novellen 1923)
- "Bianca Maria" (1925)
- "Der Weg ohne Ziel" (1926)
- "Der Geiger" (1927)
- "Basil Brunin" (1928)
- "Liebe in Monte" (1930)
- "Insel der Jugend" (1929)
- "Klaus Schöpfer" (1931)
- "Die Unbekannte" (1934), inspired by L'Inconnue de la Seine
