= Coronary perfusion pressure =

Coronary Vasculature

Coronary perfusion pressure (CPP) refers to the pressure gradient that drives coronary blood pressure. The heart's function is to perfuse blood to the body; however, the heart's own myocardium (heart muscle) must, itself, be supplied for its own muscle function. The heart is supplied by coronary vessels, and therefore CPP is the blood pressure within those vessels. If pressures are too low in the coronary vasculature, then the myocardium risks ischemia (restricted blood flow) with subsequent myocardial infarction or cardiogenic shock.

== Physiology ==
The coronary arteries originate off of the ascending aorta and continue onto the surface of the heart (the epicardium). When the heart contracts during systole, the contraction compresses the coronary arteries, which prevents perfusion. Therefore, it is only when the heart relaxes, during diastole, that the coronary vessels open up and allow for perfusion; thus CPP is highest during diastole, unlike most other arteries, which experience higher perfusion pressures under systole. CPP can be measured by calculating the difference between the aortic pressure and the left ventricular end diastolic pressure (LVEDP):

Coronary Perfusion Pressure (CPP) = Aortic Diastolic Pressure – Left Ventricular end-diastolic Pressure (LVEDP)

In the research setting, the absolute CPP can be measured using coronary and aortic pressure transducers; however, CPP is not regularly measured in human clinical practice. During cardiac surgery, when a patient is placed on cardiopulmonary bypass, and blood is passed through the coronary vessels in a retrograde direction, CPP can be approximated by using the measured right atrial pressure in place of LVEDP because the coronary sinus drains into the right atrium.

CPP is not the sole determinant of coronary blood flow (CBF). CBF is also determined mainly by metabolic autoregulation. Sympathetic regulation plays some role in coronary dilation and constriction, but less so than in other vascular systems. That is, when the ventricular myocardium is working, it extracts oxygen from the coronary blood and produces adenosine as a byproduct of ATP use. Hypoxia and adenosine both contribute to coronary vasodilation, which increase CBF. Both higher CPP and greater vasodilation will result in higher CBF.

== Clinical relevance ==
=== Cardiac arrest ===
The concept of CPP, while relevant to overall cardiovascular physiology, is acutely important in cardiac arrest care. Cardiac arrests are fundamentally treated with CPR which includes chest compressions. These compressions serve two goals. First, the compressions circulate blood to the brain and other tissues which helps reduce their ischemia and attenuates later post-cardiac arrest syndrome. This goal is accomplished during the compression phase of the CPR cycle as it creates systole-like hemodynamics .

The second goal, is to perfuse the heart itself. Perfusion of the heart is necessary for successful defibrillation (if the arrest type is shockable) and ROSC. This is accomplished during the relaxation phase of CPR as it creates diastole-like conditions.

During cardiac arrest, CPP is one of the most important variables associated with the likelihood of return of spontaneous circulation (ROSC), the restoration of a pulse. A CPP of at least 15 mmHg is thought to be necessary for ROSC. Epinephrine, administered as part of ACLS for cardiac arrest care seems to increase CPP due to its combined effects of inotropy and vasoconstriction.

=== Myocardial infarction ===
Type 2 myocardial Infarctions (T2MI) result any time coronary flow is reduced secondary to a non-thrombotic cause. Because coronary flow is determined partly by coronary perfusion pressure, a reduction in CPP increases the risk of T2MI. Reduced CPP can be the result of a multitude of pathologies including cardiogenic shock and tachyarrythmia. Patients who are CPP dependent, such as those with CAD and heart failure, are particularly susceptible to T2MI when insulted with a further reduced CPP.

==== Coronary artery disease ====
CPP becomes relevant in coronary artery disease (CAD) as atherosclerosis causes stenosis of the coronary arteries. The arteries initially respond by vasodilating to maintain coronary blood flow. However once the vasodilatory capacity is maximized, the coronary arteries become solely dependent on high enough CPP to perfuse past the atherosclerotic lesion. If CPP can not be maintained at a high enough pressure, the coronary arteries and underlying myocardium become ischemic.

==== Heart failure ====
Heart failure, both with and without preserved ejection fraction, though through different mechanisms, result in an increase in left ventricular end-diastolic pressure (LVEDP). Because CPP is measured by the difference in aortic and LVEDP pressures, an increase in LVEDP will decrease CPP. The heart may compensate for this reduction in CPP by increasing contractility and subsequent aortic pressure. However, this process requires greater oxygen consumption and will promote ventricular remodeling. While this process may acutely compensate for the initial reduction in CPP, the overall process of hypertrophic remodeling is deleterious and leaves the heart susceptible to ischemia.

== See also ==
- Coronary arteries
- Coronary circulation
- Coronary artery disease
