= Chain of survival =

Medical interventions for cardiac arrest

The chain of survival refers to a series of actions that, properly executed, reduce the mortality associated with sudden cardiac arrest. Like any chain, the chain of survival is only as strong as its weakest link. The six interdependent links in the chain of survival are early recognition of sudden cardiac arrest and access to emergency medical care, early CPR, early defibrillation, early advanced cardiac life support, and physical and emotional recovery. The first three links in the chain can be performed by lay bystanders, while the second three links are designated to medical professionals. Currently, between 70 and 90% of cardiac arrest patients die before they reach the hospital. However, a cardiac arrest does not have to be lethal if bystanders can take the right steps immediately.

== Background ==
According to the American Heart Association, out-of-hospital cardiac arrest can affect more than 300,000 people in the United States each year. Three minutes after the onset of cardiac arrest, a lack of blood flow starts to damage the brain, and 10 minutes after, the chances of survival are low. Therefore, bystanders have only a few minutes to act to optimize a person's chances of survival and recovery.

To improve survival outcomes for people who have experienced out-of-hospital cardiac arrest, the American Heart Association–International Liaison Committee on Resuscitation recommended the chain of survival concept in the early 2000s. Originally, the chain consisted of four steps: early access to emergency medical care was the first link, the second link was early CPR, early defibrillation was the third link, and the final link was early advanced cardiac life support. Over the years, the American Heart Association has added two new links to the chain: post-resuscitation care in 2010, and physical and emotional recovery in 2020. Also in 2020, the American Heart Association issued a new pediatric chain of survival for infants, children, and adolescents.

Mary M. Newman, co-founder and president/CEO of the Sudden Cardiac Arrest (SCA) Foundation and previous executive director of the National Center for Early Defibrillation at the University of Pittsburgh, developed the chain of survival metaphor and first described it in an article she wrote for the Journal of Emergency Medical Services in 1989, and further promoted in an editorial she wrote for the first issue of Currents in Emergency Cardiac Care in 1990. The American Heart Association later adopted the concept and elaborated on it in its 1992 guidelines for cardiopulmonary resuscitation and emergency cardiac care, The International Liaison Committee on Resuscitation (ILCOR) echoed the concept in 1997. The links of the Chain of survival are described below.

== Early access to emergency medical care ==
Ideally, someone must recognize an impending cardiac arrest or otherwise witness the cardiac arrest and activate the EMS system as early as possible with an immediate call to the emergency services. Unfortunately, many persons experiencing symptoms (for example, angina) that may lead to a cardiac arrest ignore these warning symptoms or, recognizing these warning symptoms correctly, fail to activate the EMS system, preferring to contact relatives instead (e.g., the elderly often contact their adult offspring rather than contact emergency services).

== Early CPR ==
To be most effective, bystanders should provide CPR immediately after a patient collapses. In their 2015 guidelines, the American Heart Association re-emphasized the importance of more bystanders performing hands-only CPR until EMS personnel arrive because, at present, fewer than 40% of people who have an out-of-hospital cardiac arrest receive CPR from a bystander. The guidelines recommend lay rescuers start CPR on a person with presumed cardiac arrest because the overall risk of harm to patients from CPR is low, even if their heart hasn't stopped beating. Properly performed CPR can keep the heart in a shockable rhythm for 10–12 minutes longer.

== Early defibrillation ==
Most adults who can be saved from cardiac arrest are in ventricular fibrillation or pulseless ventricular tachycardia, which means their heart has fallen out of rhythm. Early defibrillation is the link in the chain most likely to improve survival since defibrillation can help shock the heart back into a regular beat. Early, rapid defibrillation is considered the most important link in the chain of survival. Rapid defibrillation outside of the hospital improves the chances of survival by as much as 30%, and involves using an automated external defibrillator (AED) to shock the patient's heart.

While CPR keeps blood flowing artificially, rapid defibrillation is the only way to restart the heart and reset it to a healthy rhythm. And while only 40% of adults experiencing cardiac arrest receive CPR, fewer than 12% receive shocks from an AED before EMS arrival. What is more, the chances of the patient's survival decrease by as much as 10% with every minute that they do not receive rapid defibrillation.

AEDs are becoming more common in businesses, schools, and even the home as the public becomes more aware of the importance of rapid defibrillation. AEDs come with pre-recorded instructions and are easy to use. If an AED is not available, bystanders will need to continue CPR until emergency responders arrive with a defibrillator, which is why it is important to recognize cardiac arrest and call for help quickly.

Public access defibrillation may be the key to improving survival rates in out-of-hospital cardiac arrest, but is of the greatest value when the other links in the chain do not fail.

== Early advanced care ==
Early advanced cardiac life support by paramedics is another critical link in the chain of survival. In communities with survival rates > 20%, a minimum of two of the rescuers are trained to the advanced level.

Some ACLS ambulance providers will administer medications to manage pain, arrhythmias, shock, and pulmonary congestion; monitor the heart rhythm to identify any potentially lethal cardiac arrhythmias; or initiate transcutaneous pacing. ACLS ambulance providers use the mnemonic "MONA" (morphine, oxygen, nitroglycerin, and aspirin) to reflect the out-of-hospital therapies they will use for cardiac arrest.

Often, ACLS ambulance providers will attach an electrocardiogram to the patient and transmit its findings to the receiving hospital or care facility, which leads to earlier diagnosis of a heart attack, and significantly reduces time to treatment at the hospital. This prearrival ECG and notification has been shown to improve patient outcomes. In the event of a complication at the scene of the event or on the way to the hospital, ACLS ambulance providers can administer life saving therapies, including CPR, rapid defibrillation, airway management, and intravenous medications.

== Recovery ==
In October 2020, the American Heart Association added the recovery phase as the sixth link in the chain of survival. Recovery consists of cardiac arrest survivors receiving treatment, surveillance, and rehabilitation at a hospital. It also includes an assessment for anxiety, depression, and post-traumatic stress, which can all lead to future repeated events. Before being discharged from the hospital, the American Heart Association recommends that cardiac arrest survivors receive rehabilitation assessment and treatment for physical, neurologic, cardiopulmonary, and cognitive impairments. They also recommend that cardiac arrest survivors and their caregivers receive comprehensive, multidisciplinary discharge planning to include medical and rehabilitative treatment recommendations and return to activity and work expectations.

A patient's recovery from cardiac arrest continues long after their initial hospitalization following the event, so the American Heart Association recommended in their 2020 guidelines that patients have formal assessment and support for their physical, cognitive, and psychosocial needs.

== See also ==
- Basic life support
- Cardiac arrest
- Cardiac Arrest Registry to Enhance Survival (CARES)
- Cardiopulmonary resuscitation
- Defibrillation
- Call-Push-Shock
- Rearrest
