= Hyperoxia =

Exposure of tissues to abnormally high concentrations of oxygen

- Specialty: Emergency Medicine, Pulmonology
- Symptoms: Irritation; Congestion and edema of the lungs
- Complications: Oxygen toxicity; Seizures; Death
- Risk factors: Hyperbaric Oxygen Therapy; Underwater Diving

Hyperoxia is the state of being exposed to high levels of oxygen; it may refer to organisms, cells and tissues that are experiencing excessive oxygenation, or to an abnormally high oxygen concentration in an environment (e.g. a body of water).

In medicine, it refers to excessive oxygen in the lungs or other body tissues, and results from raised alveolar oxygen partial pressure ― that is, alveolar oxygen partial pressure greater than that due to breathing air at normal (sea level) atmospheric pressure. This can be caused by breathing air at a pressure above normal or by breathing other gas mixtures with a high oxygen fraction, high ambient pressure or both.

The body is tolerant of some deviation from normal inspired oxygen partial pressure, but a sufficiently elevated level of hyperoxia can lead to oxygen toxicity over time, with the mechanism related to the partial pressure, and the severity related to the dose. Hyperoxia is the opposite of hypoxia; hyperoxia refers to a state in which oxygen supply to the tissues is excessive, while hypoxia refers to a state in which oxygen supply is insufficient.

Supplementary oxygen administration is widely used in emergency and intensive care medicine and can be life-saving in critical conditions, but too much can be harmful and affects a variety of pathophysiological processes. Reactive oxygen species are known problematic by-products of hyperoxia which have an important role in cell signaling pathways. There are a wide range of effects, but when the homeostatic balance is disturbed, reactive oxygen species tend to cause a cycle of tissue injury, with inflammation, cell damage, and cell death.

== Signs and symptoms ==
Associated with hyperoxia is an increased level of reactive oxygen species (ROS), which are chemically reactive molecules containing oxygen. These oxygen containing molecules can damage lipids, proteins, and nucleic acids, and react with surrounding biological tissues. The human body has naturally occurring antioxidants to combat reactive molecules, but the protective antioxidant defenses can become depleted by abundant reactive oxygen species, resulting in oxidation of the tissues and organs.

The symptoms produced from breathing high concentrations of oxygen for extended periods have been studied in a variety of animals, such as frogs, turtles, pigeons, mice, rats, guinea pigs, cats, dogs and monkeys. The majority of these studies reported the occurrence of irritation, congestion and edema of the lungs, and even death following prolonged exposures.

=== Oxygen toxicity ===
Excessive exposure to oxygen can lead to oxygen toxicity, also known as oxygen toxicity syndrome, oxygen intoxication, and oxygen poisoning. There are two main ways in which oxygen toxicity can occur: exposure to significantly elevated partial pressures of oxygen for a short period of time (acute oxygen toxicity), or exposure to more modest elevations in oxygen partial pressures but for a longer duration (chronic oxygen toxicity). Acute toxicity often presents with central nervous system (CNS) effects, while chronic toxicity often manifests with pulmonary (lung) effects.

Early CNS signs of acute oxygen toxicity may vary, though perioral twitching and spasm of small muscles of the hand are common. As exposure is prolonged, additional symptoms may develop such as nausea, tinnitus ("ringing in the ears"), dysphoria (feeling of unease), and seizure. A grand-mal seizure, also known as a generalized tonic-clonic seizure may occur. This type of seizure consists of a loss of consciousness and violent muscle contractions. Signs and symptoms of oxygen toxicity are usually prevalent, but there are no standard warning signs that suggest a seizure is about to ensue. The convulsion caused by oxygen toxicity does not lead to hypoxia, a side effect common to most seizures, because the body has an excess amount of oxygen when the convulsion begins. If oxygen toxicity is experienced while in a body of water, such as in underwater diving, a seizure may lead to drowning. If the inciting agent is removed, there are typically no long-term neurological impacts of oxygen toxicity.

Pulmonary damage results from reactive oxygen species altering structures within the lungs, such as damaging the pulmonary epithelium and inactivating the surfactant. Pulmonary symptoms may begin with slight irritation in the trachea. A mild cough usually ensues, followed by greater irritation and a worse cough, until breathing becomes quite painful and the cough becomes uncontrollable. If supplementation of oxygen is continued, the individual will notice tightness in the chest, difficulty breathing, and shortness of breath. If exposure is continued, a fatality may result due to the lack of oxygen. Hemoptysis (coughing up blood) may also be seen. Pulmonary damage is often reversible over time after inciting agent is removed.

Ocular (eye) damage may also occur. In premature infants this may be seen as retinopathy of prematurity and retrolental fibroplasia. Swelling of the retina may also occur, and with prolonged exposure there is increased likelihood of cataract development.

== Causes ==
The supplementation of oxygen has been a common procedure of pre-hospital treatment for many years. Hyperoxia often occurs in controlled medical environments where high concentrations of oxygen are administered, such as during mechanical ventilation or oxygen therapy in intensive care units. The highest risk of hyperoxia is in hyperbaric oxygen therapy, where it is a high probability side effect of the treatment for more serious conditions, and is considered an acceptable risk as it can be managed effectively without apparent long term effects. In such settings, it is crucial to regularly monitor PaO2 levels to prevent hyperoxia and its associated complications.

An additional cause of hyperoxia is related to underwater diving with breathing apparatus. Divers breath a mixture of gases which must include oxygen, and the partial pressure of oxygen in any given gas mixture will increase with depth. Atmospheric air becomes hyperoxic during the dive, and a hyperoxic gas mixture known as nitrox is used to reduce the risk of decompression sickness by substituting oxygen for part of the nitrogen content. Breathing nitrox can lead to oxygen toxicity due to the high partial pressure of oxygen if used too deep or for too long. Protocols for the safe use of raised oxygen partial pressure in diving are well established and used routinely by recreational scuba divers, military combat divers and professional saturation divers alike.

Oxygen rebreathers are also used for normobaric routine work and emergency response in non-breatheable atmospheres, or in circumstances where the suitability of the ambient gas for breathing is unknown or may change without warning, such as firefighting, underground rescue, and work in confined spaces. Supplemental oxygen is also used for high altitude exposures in aviation and mountaineering. In all these cases, the maximum concentration is naturally limited by the ambient pressure, but the lower limit is usually more difficult to control, and the immediate consequences of hypoxia are generally more serious that the immediate consequences of hyperoxia, so there is a tendency to provide a larger margin for error for hypoxia, and the user is exposed to hyperoxic conditions for much of the time.

== Mechanism ==
Supplementary oxygen is an effective and widely available treatment for hypoxemia and hypoxia associated with many pathological processes, but other pathophysiological processes are associated with increased levels of ROS caused by hyperoxia. These ROS react with biological tissues and may damage proteins, lipids, and nucleic acids. Antioxidants that normally protect tissues can be overwhelmed by higher levels of ROS, thereby causing oxidative stress.

Alveolar and alveolar capillary epithelial cells are vulnerable to injuries caused by oxygen free radicals due to hyperoxia. In acute lung injuries of this type, hyperpermeability of the pulmonary microvasculature allows plasma leakage, causing pulmonary edema and abnormalities in coagulation and fibrin deposition. Surfactant production can be impaired. The maximum benefit of oxygen availability is a balance between necessity and toxicity along a continuum.

Cumulative oxygen dose is determined by a combination of exposure time, ambient pressure, and the oxygen fraction of the inhaled gas. The latter two factors can be combined as the partial pressure of inhaled oxygen in the alveoli. Partial pressures of inhaled oxygen exceeding 0.6 bar (FIO2 >0.6 at normal atmospheric pressure), administered for extended periods in the order of days, are toxic to the lungs. This is known as low-pressure oxygen poisoning, pulmonary toxicity, or the Lorrain Smith effect. This form of exposure leads to lung airway congestion, pulmonary edema, and atelectasis caused by damage to the linings of the bronchi and alveoli. Fluid accumulation in the lungs causes a feeling of shortness of breath, a burning sensation is felt in the throat and chest, and breathing becomes painful. At normal atmospheric pressures, the effect is mainly confined to the lungs as they are directly exposed to the high concentration of oxygen, which is not distributed throughout the body due to the hemoglobin-oxygen buffer system, with relatively little oxygen carried in solution in the plasma. At higher ambient pressures and higher oxygen partial pressures, where a larger amount of oxygen is carried in solution, toxic effects on the central nervous system manifest over a much shorter exposure time. This is known as high-pressure oxygen poisoning, or the Paul Bert effect.

Hyperoxia has also been linked to cellular damage through the induction of apoptosis and necrosis. The overproduction of ROS can disrupt cellular signaling pathways, lead to mitochondrial dysfunction, and trigger inflammatory responses. These effects contribute to the pathogenesis of diseases such as acute respiratory distress syndrome (ARDS) and chronic obstructive pulmonary disease (COPD). In the central nervous system, high levels of oxygen can cause seizures, which are a significant risk in hyperbaric oxygen therapy if not carefully monitored. Besides, hyperoxia can result in vasoconstriction, particularly affecting cerebral and coronary circulation, potentially leading to adverse outcomes, including increased mortality in critically ill patients.

Further research is ongoing to better understand the long-term impacts of hyperoxia on various organs and systems, as well as to optimize oxygen therapy protocols to minimize these risks while ensuring effective treatment for hypoxic conditions.

== Diagnosis ==
Hyperoxia is primarily diagnosed by measuring the partial pressure of oxygen (PaO2) in arterial blood. This method is more accurate than non-invasive measures like the Oxygen Reserve Index (ORI) and oxygen saturation (SpO2), which have shown limited diagnostic accuracy for detecting hyperoxia, particularly in critically ill patients.

The primary diagnostic method for hyperoxia involves measuring the partial pressure of oxygen in arterial blood through arterial blood gas (ABG) analysis. This approach is considered the gold standard for diagnosing hyperoxia, as it accurately assesses PaO2 levels. Normally, PaO2 ranges from 75 to 100 mmHg, with hyperoxia generally being recognized when PaO2 exceeds 100 mmHg.

In addition to PaO2 measurement, non-invasive methods such as the Oxygen Reserve Index (ORI) and oxygen saturation (SpO2) are also used, though their effectiveness is limited. The ORI, despite being non-invasive, has a low correlation with PaO2 and is therefore unreliable for diagnosing hyperoxia. Studies have shown that ORI's ability to detect PaO2 levels greater than 100 mmHg is limited, as indicated by an area under the receiver operating characteristic curve (AUROC) of only 0.567. Similarly, SpO2 measured via pulse oximetry is useful for monitoring oxygen levels, but its diagnostic utility for hyperoxia is constrained because SpO2 readings are capped at 100%. This makes SpO2 more effective for detecting hypoxia rather than hyperoxia.

== Prevention ==
=== Diving ===
Divers can be at risk from both central nervous system and pulmonary oxygen toxicity, and the risks have been well researched. Protocols have been developed which impose limits on oxygen partial pressure in the breathing gas which expose the diver to acceptable overall risks, bearing in mind that convulsions and loss of consciousness underwater on scuba equipment often lead to death by drowning. Diving with surface supplied gas using a helmet or full-face mask protects the airway much more than a demand valve held by the teeth, and in some circumstances, slightly higher partial pressures and a slightly higher risk of oxygen toxicity may be acceptable. There is a trade-off between risk from longer decompression obligations which keep the diver in the water longer, versus oxygen toxicity.

In surface orientated diving the exposure time is usually insufficient to develop symptoms of pulmonary toxicity, and the intervals between dives are usually long enough for recovery, so oxygen partial pressure is commonly selected to maximise no-stop time or minimise decompression time as in-water decompression in cold water tends to be stressful to the diver. In saturation diving, where the diver will be breathing the gas mixture under pressure for periods in the order of weeks to a month, the P_{O_{2}} must be kept low enough to avoid pulmonary toxicity, and allow downward excursions from storage pressure, while being high enough to allow for possible contingencies involving temporary reduction of pressure, during which it is highly desirable that the affected divers remain conscious and are able to perform necessary tasks to minimise the consequences, and to allow for upwards excursions without requiring a gas switch. A partial pressure of around 0.4 bar has been found to satisfy these conditions.

=== Hyperbaric medicine ===
Hyperbaric medicine is the medical use of oxygen at a higher pressure level than our atmosphere. Hyperbaric medicine is also known as hyperbaric oxygen therapy (HBOT). The air we normally breathe is composed of 21 percent oxygen. Hyperbaric treatments utilise 100 percent oxygenated air to treat many conditions. This therapy increases the amount of oxygen delivered to body tissues, which can accelerate healing and combat infections. HBOT has become a recognized adjunctive treatment for a variety of conditions, including decompression sickness, carbon monoxide poisoning, and chronic non-healing wounds. One of the primary FDA-approved uses of HBOT is for treating decompression sickness, a risk faced by divers ascending too rapidly. In this condition, nitrogen bubbles form in the bloodstream due to pressure changes. HBOT helps reduce bubble size and promotes nitrogen elimination. Similarly, carbon monoxide poisoning is another approved indication, as HBOT reduces the half-life of carboxyhemoglobin and mitigates neurological damage. Chronic wound care, particularly in diabetic patients, is another growing area where HBOT has shown benefit. Diabetic foot ulcers often suffer from poor blood flow and oxygenation, leading to delayed healing. HBOT can enhance angiogenesis, fibroblast proliferation, and collagen synthesis—critical components of the wound healing process. A systematic review in 2022 revealed its usefulness in treatment of Fournier's Gangrene. Despite its benefits, HBOT is not without risks. Potential complications include barotrauma to the ears and lungs, oxygen toxicity seizures, and claustrophobia. Therefore, careful patient selection and monitoring are essential.

=== Critical care and emergency medicine ===
Supplemental oxygen is one of the most commonly used treatments for critical illness and is routinely used in treatment in acute shock and other emergency medicine, but the optimum dosage is seldom obvious, and during mechanical ventilation, anesthesia, and resuscitation supply usually exceeds physiological requirements, to avoid a deficit. The resulting excess to requirements can be detrimental, but usually less so than an overall hypoxic state. Careful titration of the oxygen supply while monitoring oxygenation can allow sufficient tissue oxygenation without hyperoxic harm. While adhering to regulations and recommended levels, oxygen levels can be individualised and tailored to the patient's conditions to reduce the risk of hyperoxia.

=== Long term oxygen therapy ===
At atmospheric pressure, there is no risk of acute oxygen toxicity, but the possibility of pulmonary toxicity exists, and hyperoxia can exacerbate some of the conditions for which supplementary oxygen provision is otherwise beneficial. Long-term oxygen therapy (LTOT) is the treatment proven to improve survival in chronic obstructive pulmonary disease (COPD) patients with chronic respiratory failure. It also appears to reduce the number of hospitalizations, increase effort capacity, and improve health-related quality of life.

== Treatment ==
The management of hyperoxia primarily involves titrating oxygen therapy to avoid excessive oxygen levels while ensuring adequate tissue oxygenation. Clinical guidelines recommend maintaining arterial oxygen saturation (SpO2) within a target range of 88-95% to prevent both hypoxemia and hyperoxemia.

Emerging evidence suggests that prolonged exposure to high oxygen levels, even when clinically indicated, can lead to cellular injury due to oxidative stress. Hyperoxia-induced lung injury, neurological effects, and disruptions in systemic circulation have been observed in certain cases, particularly in patients with preexisting conditions. These risks highlight the importance of constant vigilance in managing oxygen levels, especially in critical care.

Antioxidant therapy may be employed to mitigate the harmful effects of ROS generated during hyperoxia. Additionally, careful monitoring and adjustment of mechanical ventilation settings are crucial in critical care settings to balance oxygen delivery and minimize the risk of oxygen toxicity. Recent studies emphasize the importance of individualized oxygen therapy, considering the patient's specific clinical condition and response to treatment.

- Individualized Oxygen Therapy: Personalized oxygen titration is emerging as a prevention strategy. By adjusting oxygen levels based on the patient's specific needs, particularly in critical care and neonatal care, clinicians aim to prevent hyperoxia-induced damage.
- Antioxidant Therapy :Recent research suggests that administering antioxidants like N-acetylcysteine (NAC) or vitamin C during oxygen therapy can mitigate the oxidative stress caused by hyperoxia, preventing cellular damage.
- Low-flow Oxygen Protocol: Low-flow oxygen delivery systems are increasingly recommended to prevent hyperoxia, especially in long-term oxygen therapy patients, minimizing exposure to excessive oxygen levels over time.
- Monitoring and Feedback Systems: New technologies that continuously monitor arterial oxygen partial pressures (PaO2) and deliver feedback to oxygen therapy systems are under development to prevent prolonged hyperoxia.

== Prognosis ==
Prognosis for excess oxygen in the body is extremely variable by duration, severity of exposure, and patient health. In the acute setting, it can cause dramatic effects such as seizures, particularly in the context of high-pressure exposure such as hyperbaric therapy, and lung injury, including inflammation and edema, that can advance to acute respiratory distress syndrome (ARDS). Although most adults have near-normal lung function after brief exposure, chronic disease such as fibrosis or chronic respiratory impairment can follow long-term increased oxygen, particularly in ARDS survivors. Critically ill patients, such as post-cardiac arrest patients, are at increased risk for hospital mortality, with studies showing an adjusted odds ratio of 1.22, although long-term survival is less well established. Premature infants are at particular risk, with most developing bronchopulmonary dysplasia that can cause lifelong respiratory impairment despite partial improvement by early childhood.

== Epidemiology ==
Epidemiologically, hyperoxia primarily centers on its prevalence in clinical settings where patients receive supplemental oxygen, such as intensive care units, neonatal wards, and while receiving anesthesia. It is frequently observed in populations with conditions like COPD, ARDS, and cardiac arrest, where oxygen therapy is routine. Though it is essential for treatment, prolonged exposure to high oxygen levels can lead to harmful oxidative stress, which could potentially lead to complications such as lung damage, retinopathy in neonates, and poor, or worsened neurological outcomes. The occurrence of hyperoxia varies across healthcare systems depending on the rigor of oxygen monitoring and management practices.

== See also ==
- Hyperbaric medicine – Medical treatment at raised ambient pressure
- Hypoxemia – Abnormally low level of oxygen in the blood
- Hypoxia – Medical condition of lack of oxygen in the tissues
- Oxygen therapy – Use of oxygen as a medical treatment
- Oxygen toxicity – Toxic effects of breathing oxygen at high partial pressures
