= Post-cardiac arrest syndrome =

- Other names: Post-resuscitation disease
- Symptoms: Brain injury, myocardial injury, systemic ischemia/reperfusion response
- Usual onset: After resuscitation from a cardiac arrest
- Duration: Weeks
- Causes: Global ischemia-reperfusion injury
- Risk factors: Prolonged cardiac arrest
- Differential diagnosis: Systemic inflammatory response syndrome
- Management: Hemodynamic stabilization and supportive care

Post-cardiac arrest syndrome (PCAS) is an inflammatory state of pathophysiology that can occur after a patient is resuscitated from a cardiac arrest. While in a state of cardiac arrest, the body experiences a unique state of global ischemia. This ischemia results in the accumulation of metabolic waste which instigate the production of inflammatory mediators. If return of spontaneous circulation (ROSC) is achieved after CPR, then circulation resumes, resulting in global reperfusion and the subsequent distribution of the ischemia products throughout the body. While PCAS has a unique cause and consequences, it can ultimately be thought of as type of global ischemia-reperfusion injury. The damage, and therefore prognosis, of PCAS generally depends on the length of the patient's ischemic period; the severity of PCAS is not uniform across different patients.

== Causes and mechanisms ==
Before cardiac arrest, the body is in a state of homeostasis. Arterial blood circulates appropriately through the body, supplying oxygen to tissues while the venous blood collects metabolic waste products to be utilized elsewhere and/or eliminated from the body. However, during cardiac arrest, the body is in circulatory and pulmonary arrest. Oxygen is no longer being ventilated by the lungs, and blood ceases to circulate throughout the body. As a result, all tissues in the body start to enter a state of ischemia. In this state, metabolic waste products, such as lactic acid and carbon dioxide, begin to accumulate as there is no circulation to move these products to the appropriate organs. This state of ischemia will continue until ROSC is achieved through CPR, at which time, blood starts to be reperfused throughout the body. This reperfusion results in inflammatory injury through three overlapping mechanisms. Some complimentary combination of, first, mitochondrial damage and, second, endothelial activation, causes a release of reactive oxygen species (ROS), which initiates and/or exacerbates a pathophysiological inflammatory response. Third, reperfusion initiates an immune, inflammatory response resulting in the circulation of pro-inflammatory cytokines such as TNFα, IL-6 and IL-8 as well as complement activation (such as TCC and C3bc). Unlike other causes of ischemia-reperfusion injury, such as organ transplants, PCAS results from global ischemia-reperfusion and subsequently has global organ damage.

== Signs and symptoms ==
The severity of PCAS is highly dependent on many variables including: the underlying cause of the arrest, the length of the ischemic period, the quality of CPR received, and a patient's physiologic reserve. However, organs generally respond to an ischemic period in predictable ways and therefore PCAS has an average presentation. The symptoms of PCAS are related to the effect of ischemia-reperfusion injury on individual systems, though there is significant co-morbidity between all organs' responses.

=== Brain ===
Being highly metabolic with low blood reserves, the brain is the most sensitive organ to ischemia. As a result, any amount of brain ischemia, especially when it is prolonged in cases of cardiac arrest, typically results in brain injury. Increasingly severe injury can lead to long term consequences such as cognitive dysfunction, persistent vegetative state and finally brain death. The brain sustains irreversible injury after about 20 minutes of ischemia. Even after blood flow is restored to the brain, patients can experience hours-days of hypotension, hypoxemia, impaired cerebrovascular autoregulation, brain edema, fever, hyperglycemia and/or seizures which further insult brain tissue. Diagnosis of brain injury involves neurological examination, EEG, brain imaging and/or biomarker evaluation (such as S100B and NSE). For out-of-hospital cardiac arrest, brain injury is the cause of death in most patients who undergo ROSC but ultimately die.

=== Heart ===
After the brain, the heart is the second most sensitive organ to ischemia. If the cause of the cardiac arrest was fundamentally a coronary pathology, then the consequences to the heart may include myocardial infarction complications. However, if the fundamental cause was non-coronary, then the heart becomes ischemic as a consequence, not a cause, of the arrest. In this case, PCAS very frequently presents with myocardial dysfunction in the first minute-hours post-ROSC. This myocardial dysfunction may present as prolonged cardiogenic shock, highly variable blood pressures, reduced cardiac output and/or dysrhythmias. PCAS myocardial dysfunction seems to start almost immediately after ROSC. Unlike brain tissue, evidence suggests that the myocardial injury is generally transient and can mostly recover within 72 hours, though full recovery may take months.

=== Lungs ===
While the lungs are generally oxygenated during the ischemic period of arrest, they are still susceptible to ischemic damage. While ischemia is not the mechanism of injury, evidence suggests that the lack of perfusion through the pulmonary vasculature during an arrest reduces the alveolar–arterial gradient which creates dead space. The oxygen accumulation in the alveoli encourages ROS production which then leads to pulmonary damage. This pulmonary-specific damage, together with the systemic inflammation, causes acute respiratory distress syndrome in about 50% of ROSC patients who survive for at least 48 hours. Lung complications, such as pulmonary contusion and pulmonary edema, may result from other aspects of PCAS such as CPR and left ventricular dysfunction, respectively. Finally, pneumonia is a common pulmonary complication due to multifactoral mechanisms including: loss of airway protection, aspiration, emergency intubation, and mechanical ventilation.

=== Kidneys ===
The kidneys are the third most sensitive organ to ischemia. Prolonged renal ischemia from cardiac arrest leads to acute kidney injury (AKI) in about 40% of patients. While PCAS may independently present with AKI, the development of AKI can be exacerbated by the administration of intravenous contrast if the patient undergoes angiography. It is unclear if the development of AKI worsens PCAS overall prognosis, but it does not seem to be a major contributor to death or poor neurological outcome at this time. PCAS patients, both as a cause and a consequence of the arrest, present with acid-base and electrolyte imbalances. Accumulation of lactate and carbon dioxide during the ischemic period largely accounts for the metabolic acidosis seen in PCAS patients, though strong ion gaps and phosphate also plays a role. Worse acidosis is generally predictive of worse outcomes. Finally, though electrolytes can present variably, PCAS patients most often demonstrate hypokalemia, hypocalcemia and hypomagnesaemia Acute kidney injury is not the leading cause of death after cardiac arrest. However, evidence suggests that the kidney damage after a cardiac arrest should be highly considered in the prognosis of the patients' health outcome.

=== Liver ===
PCAS patients, especially those with longer ischemic times, can present with liver complications. About 50% of PCAS patients present with acute liver failure (ALF), while about 10% may present with the more severe hypoxic hepatitis. Development of hypoxic hepatitis predicts poor PCAS outcomes, however ALF-similar to AKI- is not necessarily associated with poor outcomes.

=== Coagulation ===
PCAS is associated with pro-thrombotic coagulopathy. The coagulopathy is, itself, pathophysiological, but thrombi can additionally contribute to co-morbidiities in the aforementioned organ systems. The ischemia-reperfusion injury promotes damage-associated molecular patterns (DAMPs) which encourage pro-inflammatory cytokine circulation, which then induces a pro-coagulopathic state. Major mechanisms of pro-coagulation in PCAS include: multiimodal activation of factors V, VII, VIII and IX leading to a thrombin burst, decreased activity of proteins C and S, and decreased anti-thrombin and tissue factor pathway inhibitor levels. Early PCAS (first 24 hours) is generally defined by hyperfibrinolysis, due to increased tissue plasminogen activator activity, resulting in a risk of disseminated intravascular coagulation. However late PCAS generally presents with hypofibrinolysis, due to increased PAI-1 levels, resulting in a risk of multiorgan dysfunction. PCAS patients also generally show some degree of thrombocytopenia within the first 48 hours.

=== Endocrine ===
The endocrine functions most clinically relevant to PCAS are glycemic control and the hypothalamic–pituitary–adrenal axis (HPA axis). Regarding blood glucose levels, it is very common for PCAS to present with hyperglycemia; the hyperglycemia is usually higher in diabetic patients than non-diabetic patients. Mechanisms for hyperglycemia in PCAS are mostly similar as those in stress-induced hyperglycemia and therefore include elevated cortisol levels, catchecholamine surges and elevated cytokine levels. Blood glucose levels are associated with poor outcomes in a U-shaped distribution, meaning that both very high and very low levels of glucose are associated with poor outcomes. Regarding the HPA axis, PCAS can present with elevated cortisol levels from the stress of the arrest, but relative adrenal insufficiency is not uncommon in PCAS. Lower cortisol levels have been associated with poor PCAS outcomes. Newer research suggests that cardiac arrest may damage the pituitary gland, thus explaining some of the HPA dysregulation.

== Management ==
PCAS consist of five phases: the immediate phase (20 minutes after ROSC), early phase (from 20 minutes to 6–12 hours after ROSC), intermediate phase (from 6–12 to 72 hours after ROSC), recovery phase (3 days after ROSC), and the rehabilitation phase. Management of PCAS is inherently variable, as it depends on the phase, organ systems affected and overall patient presentation. With the exception of targeted temperature management, there is no treatment that is unique to the pathophysiology of PCAS; therefore PCAS treatment is largely system-dependent, supportive treatment.

=== Targeted temperature management ===
Targeted temperature management (TTM) is the use of various cooling methods to reduce a patient's internal temperature. The main methods of cooling include using either cold intravenous solutions or by circulating cool fluids through an external, surface blanket/pad. While most commonly applied as a post-ROSC intervention, there are some studies and EMS systems that start the cooling process in the initial intra-arrest stage. Patients are generally cooled to a range of 32-36 °C. As of January 2021, there is active debate about the ideal cooling temperature but there is generally agreement that PCAS patients benefit by not being hyperthermic.

TTM is an important therapy in PCAS because it directly targets the systemic nature of the pathophysiological inflammatory and metabolic processes. TTM works through three major mechanisms. First, it decreases metabolism 6% to 7% per 1 °C decrease in temperature. Second, it decreases cell apoptosis which reduces tissue damage. Third, TTM directly reduces inflammation and ROS production.

=== System-based treatment ===
PCAS can present variably depending on intra-arrest dynamics and patient-specific variables. Therefore, there is no universally applicable treatments for PCAS other than TTM. However, because there are generally predictable problems, the table below presents some of the more common treatments; supporting one organ system generally has mutual benefits for the healing of other body systems. These treatments, while common, may not be applicable to every patient.

System	Common complications	Common supportive treatments
Brain	Hypoxic brain injury, seizures	Hemodynamic monitoring and optimization, Ventilator management, glucose control, antiepileptics
Cardiovascular	Hemodynamic instability, cardiogenic shock, myocardial infarction, dysrhythmia	Hemododynamic monitoring, vasopressors, antiarrhythmics, diuretics, blood transfusion, crystalloid therapy, ACLS, PCI, ECMO
Pulmonary	ARDS, pneumonia, pulmonary contusion, pulmonary edema	Intubation, ventilator management, oxygen therapy, antibiotics
Renal	Acute Kidney Injury, electrolyte imbalances, metabolic acidosis	Dialysis, electrolyte replacement, diuretics
Hepatic	Acute Liver Injury, hypoxic hepatitis	Transplantation
Coagulatory	Thrombosis (Pulmonary embolism, DVTs), DIC	Anti-Coagulation, fibrinolytics, platelet transfusion, IVCF
Endocrine	Dysglycemia, adrenal disorders	Insulin therapy, glucose therapy, corticosteroids

== Prognosis ==
Survival from PCAS is convoluted with survival from cardiac arrest generally. There are two common metrics used to define "survival" from cardiac arrest and subsequent PCAS. First is survival-to-hospital-discharge which binarily describes whether one survived long enough to leave the hospital. The second metric is neurological outcome which describes the cognitive function of a patient who survives arrest. Neurological outcome is frequently measured with a CPC score or mRS score. Cardiac arrest and PCAS outcomes are influenced by many complicated patient and treatment variables which allows for a wide array of outcomes ranging from full physical and neurological recovery to death.

PCAS outcomes are generally better under certain conditions including: fewer patient comorbidities, initial shockable rhythms, rapid CPR responses, and treatment at a high-volume cardiac arrest center. Cardiac arrest survival-to-hospital-discharge, as of 2020, is around 10%. Common long term complications of cardiac arrest and subsequent PCAS include: anxiety, depression, PTSD, fatigue, post–intensive care syndrome, muscle weakness, persistent chest pain, myoclonus, seizures, movement disorders and risk of re-arrest.

== Research ==
Research on PCAS benefits from disease-specific work as well as general improvements in critical care treatments. As of 2022, research on PCAS includes, non-exclusively, work on early resolution of ischemia through pre-hospital extracorporeal membrane oxygenation, and wide distribution of defibrillators and CPR-trained bystanders, continued investigation of TTM, use of immunosuppressive drugs such as steroids and tocilizumab, the use of cytoprotective perfusates, and the use cerebral tissue oxygen extraction fraction.

== See also ==
- Cardiac arrest
- Rearrest
- Cardiac Arrest Registry to Enhance Survival
- Advanced cardiac life support
