= Suction Assisted Laryngoscopy Airway Decontamination =

Medical technique

Suction Assisted Laryngoscopy Airway Decontamination (SALAD) is incremental step-wise approach to the management of a massively contaminated airway.

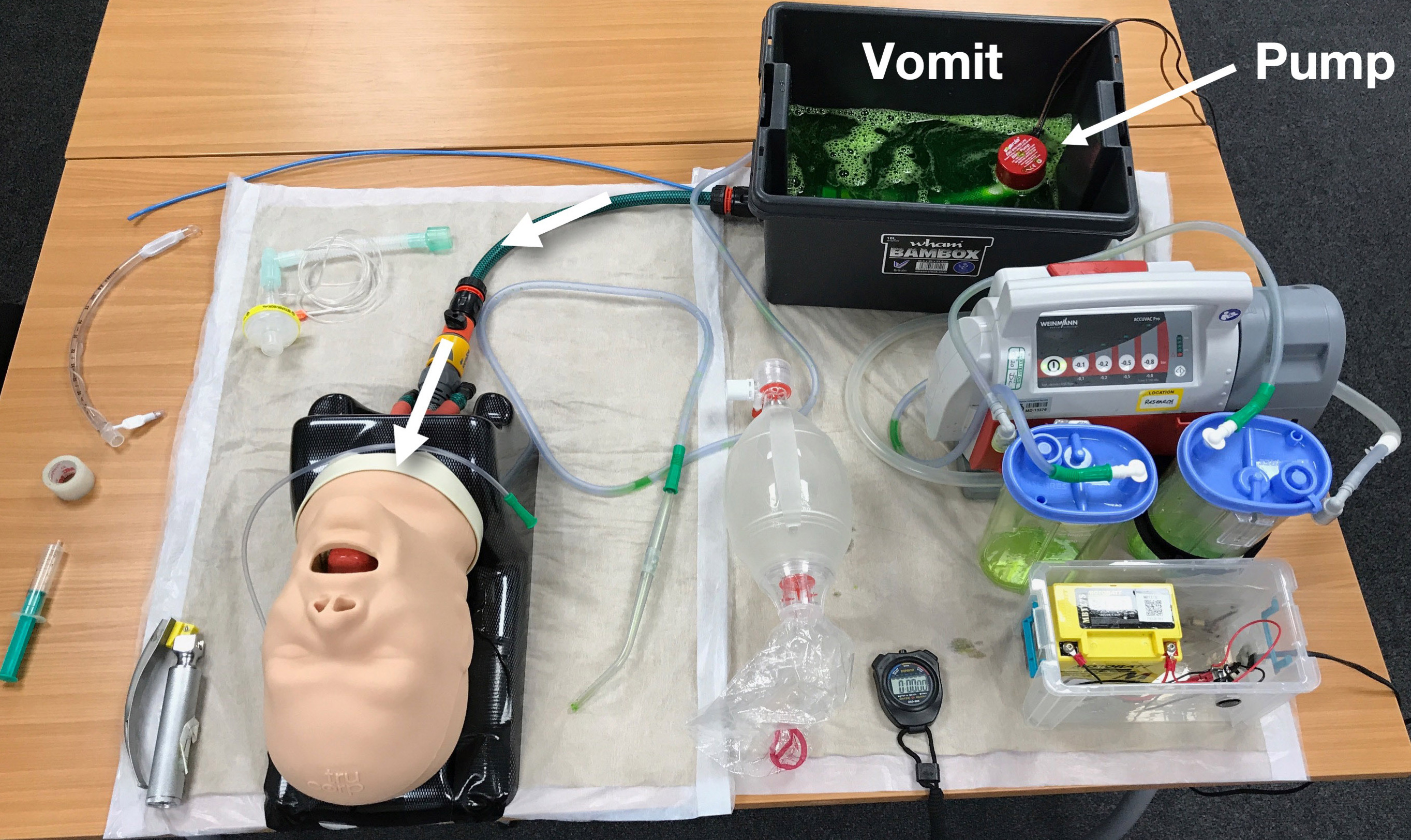
An example of a SALAD training setup. An advanced airway mannikin has been modified with standard garden hose and fixings to connect the oesophagus to a bilge pump situated in a reservoir of artificial vomit.

Emergency airway management is often complicated by the presence of blood, emesis or other contaminants in the airway. For example, in out-of-hospital cardiac arrest (OHCA), vomiting and regurgitation have a reported incidence of 20–30%. The traditional approach to the contaminated airway involves suctioning the airway and repositioning the patient, which can effectively manage airway soiling in many, but not all, cases. However, traditional airway management education has not included the integration of a simultaneous suctioning and airway decontamination skill set as a technique that can be deployed in the setting of large volume contamination and clinicians frequently underestimate the importance of suction as part of airway management.

This has led to the development of the SALAD technique, and the creation of modified airway manikins to allow for practice in these techniques.

== History ==
SALAD was developed as a simulation exercise in 2014, by a US anaesthetist Dr. Jim DuCanto. It was subsequently introduced into several US academic emergency medicine departments, culminating in its presentation at the 2015 Social Media and Critical Care Conference (SMACC). This raised the profile of the technique internationally. Following its introduction to the international community at SMACC, multiple medical educators introduced the technique in their own institutions and services across Australasia, Europe and Asia.

== Technique ==
The following description of the SALAD Technique is intended to provide a template for medical educators to practice this technique in a medical simulation setting, and does not constitute medical advice. Wikipedia does not generally approve of articles that serve as guides to perform procedures, however, many medical educators who wish to disseminate information regarding new and effective techniques to manage contaminated airways have sought a template upon which to build their simulation instructions, and this guide to the technique simply serves to provide that template.

The SALAD technique consists of the following steps:

Step	Description
1.	Optimally position the patient to maximise the probability of intubation success (e.g. external auditory meatus level with sternal notch).
2.	Hold the suction catheter (wide-bore, rigid) in a clenched-fisted right hand, with the distal end of the catheter pointing caudad and posterior, to enable manipulation of the tongue and mandible as required. The curve of the rigid suction catheter should mirror the curve of the structures of the upper airway
3.	Lead with suction to enable identification of relevant anatomical structure (posterior portion of tongue, epiglottis, vallecular and laryngeal outlet) and follow with the laryngoscope (particularly important with video laryngoscopes to avoid contaminating the optics).
4.	In order to facilitate placement of the tracheal tube, the suction catheter is moved across to the left side of the mouth and the suction catheter 'parked' in the top of the oesophagus to provide continuous suction during the remainder of the intubation attempt. This can be achieved either by sliding the catheter under the laryngoscope blade, or by briefly removing the catheter and inserting it to the left of the laryngoscope blade.
5.	Insert the index finger of the right hand into the right-hand side of the oropharynx to create a 'channel' for tracheal tube delivery (known as the SALAD poke).
6.	Intubate as normal, with or without a bougie.
7.	Inflate the cuff on the tracheal tube to prevent further contamination of the lower airway.
8.	suction down the tracheal tube with a flexible suction catheter prior to ventilation to remove any residual contaminant prior to ventilation.

Note that these images are using a hand-operated suction device, but the principle for motorised suction is the same.

== SALAD research ==
To date, there have been no large, randomised controlled trials (RCTs) of SALAD versus conventional emergency airway management strategies in real patients. The sporadic incidence of massive airway contamination during intubation attempts mean that an RCT of SALAD versus usual care is likely to be unfeasible to conduct. However, there is a growing body of lower quality evidence (simulation studies, and studies utilising observational data from patients) that are encouraging in terms of increasing clinician's confidence in managing severely contaminated airways and improving intubation success rates as well as time to successful intubation in cases of significant airway soiling. Two case reports in the peer-reviewed literature to date (Summer 2021) have described the SALAD technique as instrumental for emergency airway management in critically ill patients.
