= Resuscitation Outcomes Consortium =

The Resuscitation Outcomes Consortium (ROC) is a network of eleven regional clinical centers and a data coordinating center. The consortium conducts experimental and observational studies of out-of-hospital treatments of cardiac arrest and trauma. Ten communities in the United States and Canada doing uniform quality improvement, clinical trials, and tracking of cardiac arrest and major trauma. The network is coordinated by the University of Washington Clinical Trial Center. ROC is funded by the National Heart, Lung, and Blood Institute, Institute of Circulatory and Respiratory Health, United States Army Medical Research and Materiel Command, Defence Research and Development Canada, Heart and Stroke Foundation of Canada, and American Heart Association.

== Research Sites ==
Site	Regional Clinical Center	Service Area Population	Residents per Square Mile	No. of EMS Agencies	No. of Hospitals
Alabama, United States (Central and Northern)	Alabama Resuscitation Center	644,701	485	13	14
Dallas, Texas, United States (includes some surrounding cities)	Dallas Center for Resuscitation Research	1,989,357	3,173	11	22
Iowa, United States (participated in the network from September 2004 to February 2008)	University of Iowa Carver College of Medicine-Iowa Resuscitation Network	1,015,347	388	19	19
Milwaukee, Wisconsin, United States	The Milwaukee Resuscitation Research Center	940,164	3,885	16	16
Ottawa, Ontario, Canada (includes 20 other cities in the OPALS group)	Ottawa/OPALS/British Columbia RCC	4,030,696	314	39	37
Pittsburgh, Pennsylvania, United States (includes some suburbs)	Pittsburgh Resuscitation Network	935,967	396	6	38
Portland, Oregon, United States (includes 4 counties in Oregon and Washington)	Oregon Health & Sciences University - Portland Resuscitation Outcomes Consortium	1,751,119	431	15	16
San Diego, California, United States (includes the entire county)	UCSD/San Diego Resuscitation Research Center				
Seattle/King County, Washington, United States	Seattle-King County Center for Resuscitation Research at the University of Washington	1,666,978	1,573	35	18
Toronto, Ontario, Canada (includes surrounding areas)	Toronto Regional Resuscitation Research Out of Hospital Network	5,627,021	911	32	55
Vancouver, British Columbia, Canada	Ottawa/OPALS/British Columbia RCC	2,779,373	1,604	39	33

== Studies ==
=== Epistry Database ===
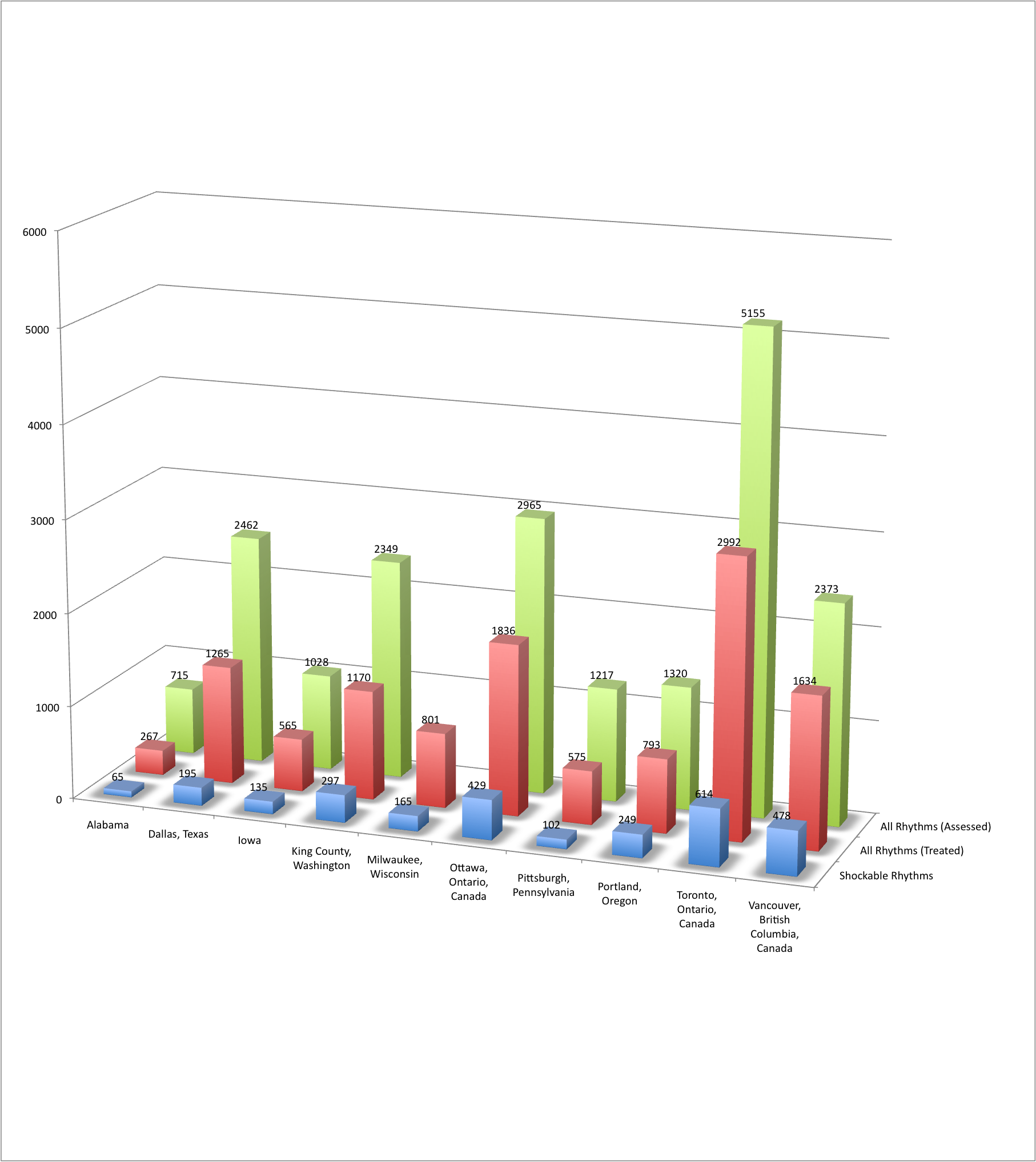
Number of cases of EMS-assessed and EMS-treated cardiac arrest and cardiac arrests with initial recorded rhythm being shockable.

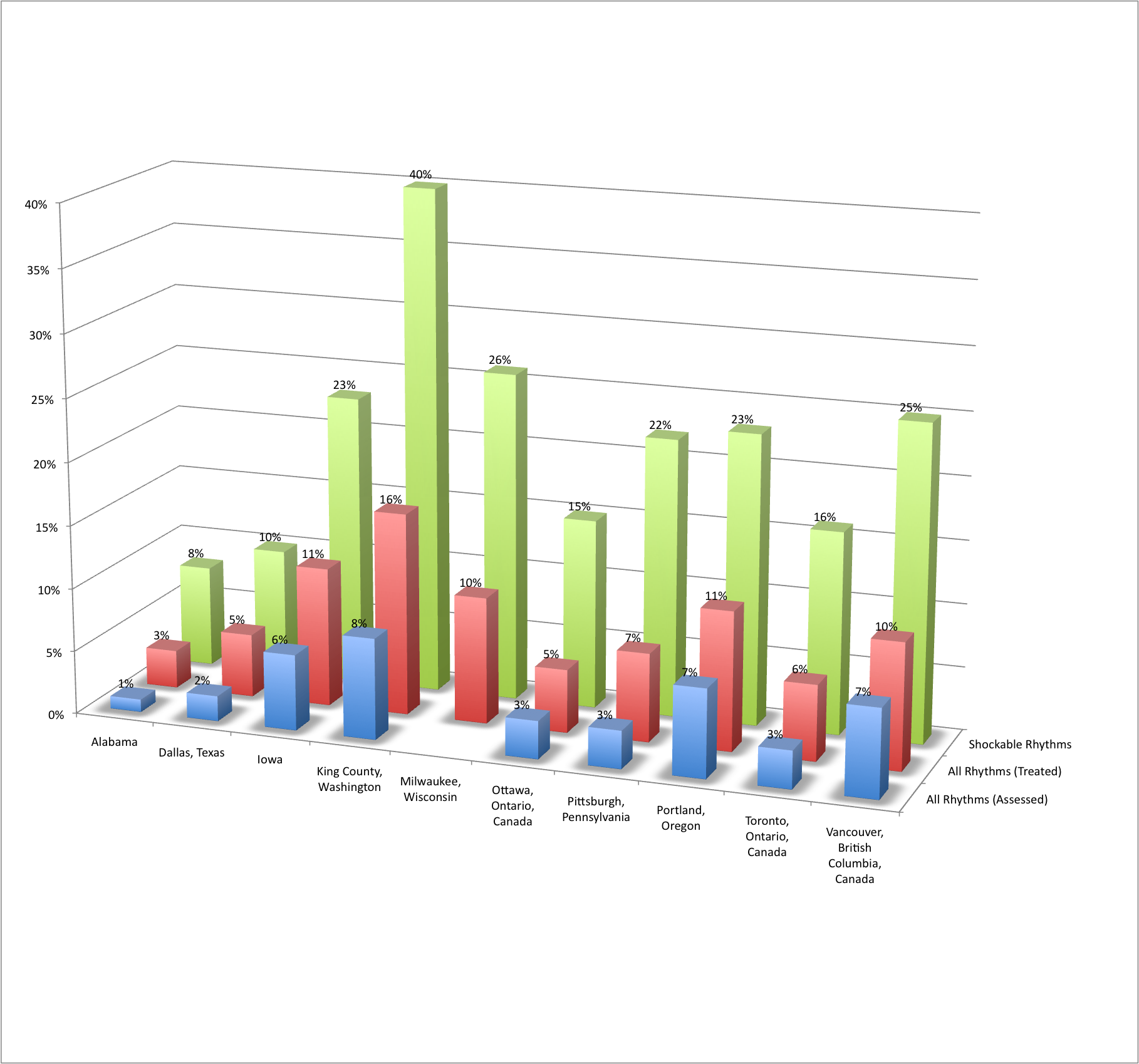
Survival rates for the period May 1, 2006 to April 30, 2007

=== ROC PRIMED ===
(Prehospital Resuscitation using an IMpedance valve and Early vs Delayed analysis) Seattle/King County did not participate in the early vs. delayed analysis portion of the trial.
