= Advanced airway =

An advanced airway includes:

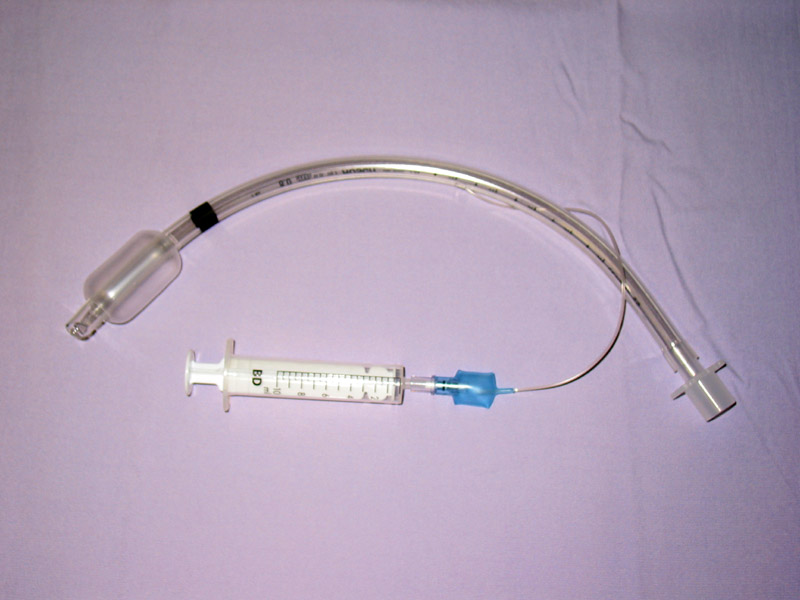
An endotracheal tube, the most frequently used advanced airway

- endotracheal tube
- supraglottic airway
  - Laryngeal mask airway
  - Combitube
  - King LT
