= Cardiac arrest =

Sudden or unexpected loss of heartbeat

- Other names: Sudden cardiac death (SCD), cardiopulmonary arrest, circulatory arrest, sudden cardiac arrest (SCA)
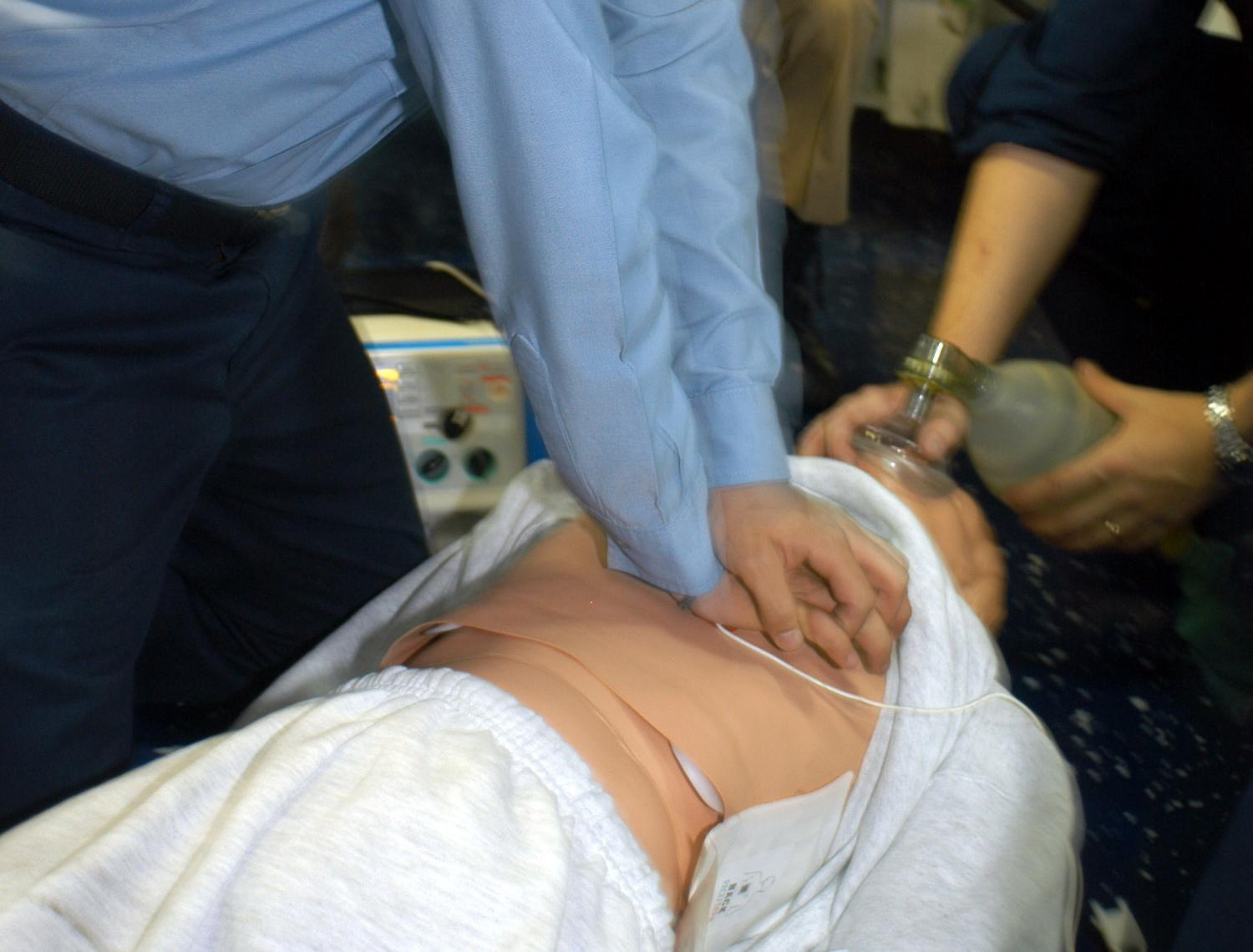
- CPR being administered during a simulation of cardiac arrest
- Specialty: Cardiology, emergency medicine
- Symptoms: Decreased level or total loss of consciousness, abnormal or no breathing, no pulse
- Complications: If reversed, coma, persistent vegetative state, post-cardiac arrest syndrome; if not reversed, death
- Usual onset: Risk increases with age, rare under age 30
- Causes: Coronary artery disease, arrhythmia, congenital heart defect, major blood loss, lack of oxygen, electrical injury, very low or very high potassium, heart failure, heart attack, hypothermia, pulmonary embolism, acidosis, tension pneumothorax, fluid around the heart
- Diagnostic method: Finding no pulse, ECG (EKG)
- Prevention: Not smoking, physical activity, maintaining a healthy weight, healthy eating
- Treatment: Cardiopulmonary resuscitation (CPR), defibrillation
- Medication: Epinephrine, amiodarone, lidocaine
- Prognosis: Overall survival rate ≈10% (outside of hospital) 25% (in hospital); depends strongly on type and cause
- Frequency: 13 per 10,000 people per year (outside hospital in the US)
- Deaths: > 425,000 per year (US)

Cardiac arrest, also known as sudden cardiac arrest (SCA), is a condition in which the heart suddenly and unexpectedly stops beating or beats in a way that fails to produce pulse. When the heart stops, blood cannot circulate properly through the body and the blood flow to the brain and other organs is decreased. When the brain does not receive enough blood, this can cause a person to lose consciousness and brain cells begin to die within minutes due to a lack of oxygen. Coma and persistent vegetative state may result from cardiac arrest. Cardiac arrest is typically identified by the absence of a central pulse and abnormal or absent breathing.

Cardiac arrest and resultant hemodynamic collapse often occur due to arrhythmias (irregular heart rhythms). Ventricular fibrillation and ventricular tachycardia are most commonly recorded. However, as many incidents of cardiac arrest occur out-of-hospital or when a person is not having their cardiac activity monitored, it is difficult to identify the specific mechanism in each case.

Structural heart disease, such as coronary artery disease, is a common underlying condition in people who experience cardiac arrest. The most common risk factors include age and cardiovascular disease. Additional underlying cardiac conditions include heart failure and inherited arrhythmias. Additional factors that may contribute to cardiac arrest include major blood loss, lack of oxygen, electrolyte disturbance (such as very low potassium), electrical injury, and intense physical exercise.

Cardiac arrest is diagnosed by the inability to find a pulse in an unresponsive patient. The goal of treatment for cardiac arrest is to rapidly achieve return of spontaneous circulation using a variety of interventions including CPR, defibrillation or cardiac pacing. Two protocols have been established for CPR: basic life support (BLS) and advanced cardiac life support (ACLS).

If return of spontaneous circulation is achieved with these interventions, then sudden cardiac arrest has occurred. By contrast, if the person does not survive the event, this is referred to as sudden cardiac death. Among those whose pulses are re-established, the care team may initiate measures to protect the person from brain injury and preserve neurological function. Some methods may include airway management and mechanical ventilation, maintenance of blood pressure and end-organ perfusion via fluid resuscitation and vasopressor support, correction of electrolyte imbalance, EKG monitoring and management of reversible causes, and temperature management. Targeted temperature management may improve outcomes. In post-resuscitation care, an implantable cardiac defibrillator may be considered to reduce the chance of death from recurrence.

Per the 2015 American Heart Association Guidelines, there were approximately 535,000 incidents of cardiac arrest annually in the United States (about 13 per 10,000 people). Of these, 326,000 (61%) experience cardiac arrest outside of a hospital setting, while 209,000 (39%) occur within a hospital.

Cardiac arrest becomes more common with age and affects males more often than females. In the United States, black people are twice as likely to die from cardiac arrest as white people. Asian and Hispanic people are not as frequently affected as white people.

== Signs and symptoms ==
Cardiac arrest is not preceded by any warning symptoms in approximately 50 percent of people. For individuals who do experience symptoms, the symptoms are usually nonspecific to the cardiac arrest. For example, new or worsening chest pain, fatigue, blackouts, dizziness, shortness of breath, weakness, or vomiting.

When cardiac arrest is suspected by a layperson (due to signs of unconsciousness, abnormal breathing or no pulse) it should be assumed that the victim is in cardiac arrest. Bystanders should call emergency medical services (such as 911, 999, 112, or 000) and initiate CPR.

== Risk factors ==
Major risk factors for cardiac arrest include age and underlying cardiovascular disease. A prior episode of sudden cardiac arrest increases the likelihood of future episodes. A 2021 meta-analysis assessing the recurrence of cardiac arrest in out-of-hospital cardiac arrest survivors identified that 15% of survivors experienced a second event, most often in the first year. Furthermore, of those who experienced recurrence, 35% had a third episode.

Additional significant risk factors include cigarette smoking, high blood pressure, high cholesterol, history of arrhythmia, lack of physical exercise, obesity, diabetes, family history, cardiomyopathy, alcohol use, and possibly caffeine intake. Current cigarette smokers with coronary artery disease were found to have a two to threefold increase in the risk of sudden death between ages 30 and 59. Furthermore, it was found that former smokers' risk was closer to that of those who had never smoked. A statistical analysis of many of these risk factors determined that approximately 50% of all cardiac arrests occur in 10% of the population perceived to be at greatest risk, due to aggregate harm of multiple risk factors, demonstrating that cumulative risk of multiple comorbidities exceeds the sum of each risk individually.

== Causes and mechanisms ==
Conduction of the heart. Changes in this pattern can result from injury to the cardiac muscle and lead to non-conducted beats and ultimately cardiac arrest.

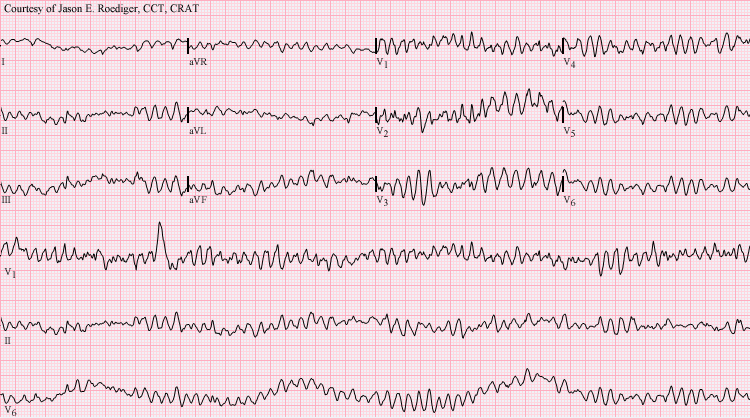
EKG depiction of ventricular fibrillation (no organized rhythm)

The underlying causes of sudden cardiac arrest can result from cardiac and non-cardiac causes. The most common underlying causes are different, depending on the patient's age. Common cardiac causes include coronary artery disease, non-atherosclerotic coronary artery abnormalities, structural heart damage, and inherited arrhythmias. Common non-cardiac causes include respiratory arrest, diabetes, medications, and trauma.

The most common mechanism underlying sudden cardiac arrest is an arrhythmia (an irregular rhythm). Without organized electrical activity in the heart muscle, there is inconsistent contraction of the ventricles, which prevents the heart from generating adequate cardiac output (forward pumping of blood from the heart to the rest of the body). This hemodynamic collapse results in poor blood flow to the brain and other organs, which if prolonged causes persistent damage.

There are many different types of arrhythmias, but the ones most frequently recorded in sudden cardiac arrest are ventricular tachycardia and ventricular fibrillation. Both ventricular tachycardia and ventricular fibrillation can prevent the heart from generating coordinated ventricular contractions, thereby failing to sustain adequate blood circulation.

Less common initial arrhythmias occurring in cardiac arrest include pulseless electrical activity and asystole. These rhythms are seen when there is prolonged cardiac arrest, progression of ventricular fibrillation, or efforts like defibrillation fail to resuscitate the person.

=== Cardiac causes ===
==== Coronary artery disease ====
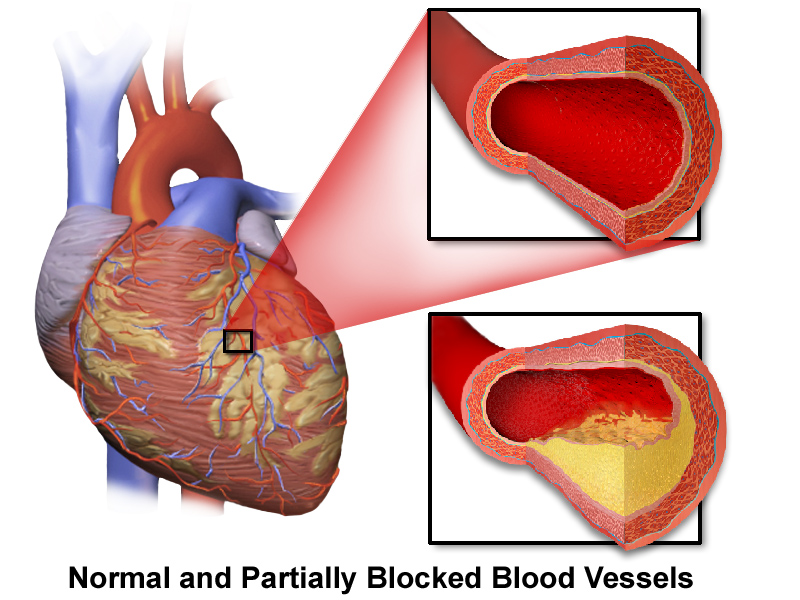
Normal vs blocked coronary artery

Coronary artery disease (CAD), also known as atherosclerotic cardiovascular disease, involves the deposition of cholesterol and subsequent inflammation-driven formation of atherosclerotic plaques in the arteries. CAD involves the accumulation and remodeling of the coronary vessels along with other systemic blood vessels. When an atherosclerotic plaque dislodges, it can block the flow of blood and oxygen through small arteries, such as the coronary arteries, resulting in ischemic injury. In the heart, this results in myocardial tissue damage which can lead to structural and functional changes that disrupt normal conduction patterns and alter heart rate and contraction.

CAD underlies 68 percent of sudden cardiac deaths in the United States. Indeed, postmortem examinations have shown that the most common finding in cases of sudden cardiac death is chronic, high-grade stenosis of at least one segment of a major coronary artery.

While CAD is a leading contributing factor, this is an age-dependent factor, with CAD being a less common cause of sudden cardiac death in people under the age of 40.

==== Non-atherosclerotic coronary artery abnormalities ====
Abnormalities of the coronary arteries not related to atherosclerosis include inflammation (known as coronary arteritis), embolism, vasospasm, mechanical abnormalities related to connective tissue diseases or trauma, and congenital coronary artery anomalies (most commonly anomalous origin of the left coronary artery from the pulmonary artery). These conditions account for 10-15% of cardiac arrest and sudden cardiac death.

- Coronary arteritis commonly results from a pediatric febrile inflammatory condition known as Kawasaki disease. Other types of vasculitis can also contribute to an increased risk of sudden cardiac death.
- Embolism, or clotting, of the coronary arteries most commonly occurs from septic emboli secondary to endocarditis with involvement of the aortic valve, tricuspid valve, or prosthetic valves.
- Coronary vasospasm may result in cardiac arrhythmias, altering the heart's electrical conduction with a risk of complete cardiac arrest from severe or prolonged rhythm changes.
- Mechanical abnormalities with an associated risk of cardiac arrest may arise from coronary artery dissection, which can be attributed to Marfan syndrome or trauma.

==== Structural heart disease ====
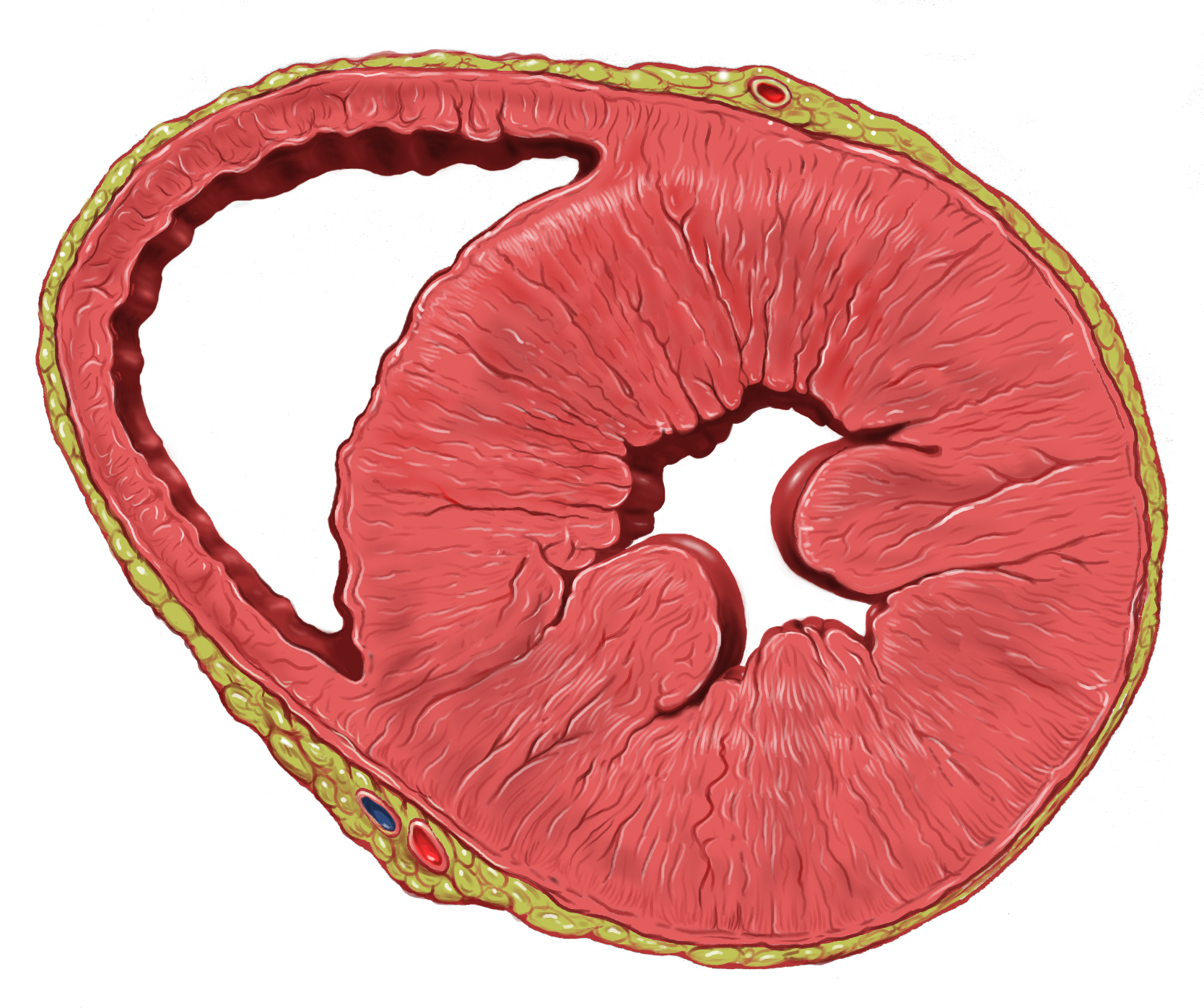
Short axis view of the heart demonstrating wall thickening in left ventricular hypertrophy

Examples of structural heart diseases include: cardiomyopathies (hypertrophic, dilated, or arrhythmogenic), cardiac rhythm disturbances, myocarditis, and congestive heart failure.

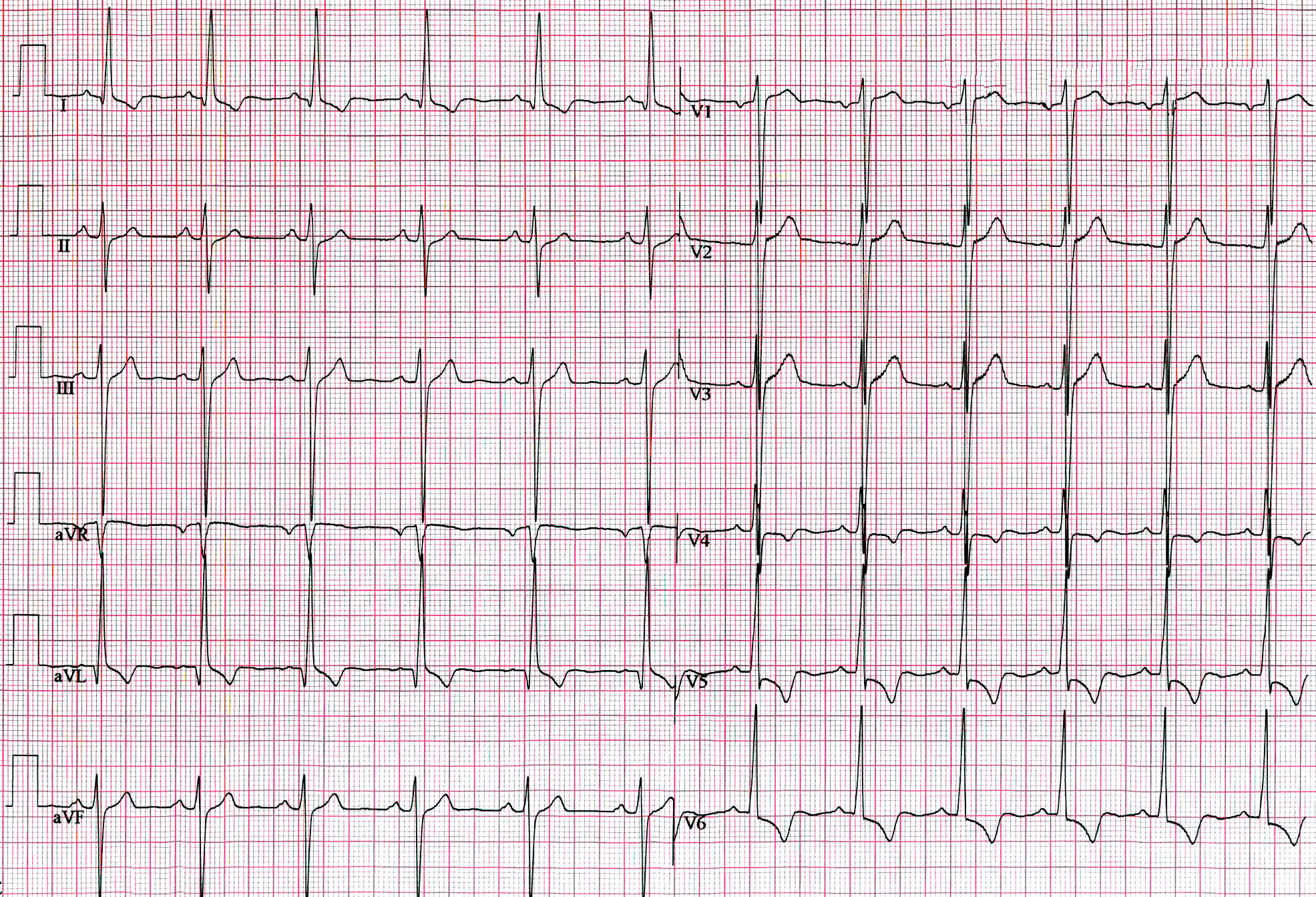
EKG depiction of left ventricular hypertrophy

Left ventricular hypertrophy is a leading cause of sudden cardiac deaths in the adult population. This is most commonly the result of longstanding high blood pressure, or hypertension, which has led to maladaptive overgrowth of muscular tissue of the left ventricle, the heart's main pumping chamber. This is because elevated blood pressure over the course of several years requires the heart to adapt to the requirement of pumping harder to adequately circulate blood throughout the body. If the heart does this for a prolonged period of time, the left ventricle can experience hypertrophy (grow larger) in a way that decreases the heart's effectiveness. Left ventricular hypertrophy can be demonstrated on an echocardiogram and electrocardiogram (EKG).

Abnormalities of the cardiac conduction system (notably the atrioventricular node and His-Purkinje system) may predispose an individual to arrhythmias with a risk of progressing to sudden cardiac arrest, albeit this risk remains low. Many of these conduction blocks can be treated with internal cardiac defibrillators for those determined to be at high risk due to severity of fibrosis or severe electrophysiologic disturbances.

Structural heart diseases unrelated to coronary artery disease account for 10% of all sudden cardiac deaths. A 1999 review of sudden cardiac deaths in the United States found that structural heart diseases accounted for over 30% of sudden cardiac arrests for those under 30 years.

==== Inherited arrhythmia syndromes ====
Arrhythmias not due to structural heart disease account for 5 to 10% of sudden cardiac arrests. These are frequently caused by genetic disorders. The genetic mutations often affect specialized proteins known as ion channels that conduct electrically charged particles across the cell membrane, and this group of conditions is therefore often referred to as channelopathies. Examples of these inherited arrhythmia syndromes include long QT syndrome (LQTS), Brugada syndrome (BrS), catecholaminergic polymorphic ventricular tachycardia (CPVT), and short QT syndrome (SQTS). Many are also associated with environmental or neurogenic triggers such as response to loud sounds that can initiate lethal arrhythmias.

LQTS, a condition often mentioned in young people's deaths, occurs in one of every 5000 to 7000 newborns and is estimated to be responsible for 3000 deaths annually compared to the approximately 300,000 cardiac arrests seen by emergency services. These conditions are a fraction of the overall deaths related to cardiac arrest but represent conditions that may be detected prior to arrest and may be treatable. The symptomatic expression of LQTS is quite broad and more often presents with syncope rather than cardiac arrest. The risk of cardiac arrest is still present, and people with family histories of sudden cardiac arrests should be screened for LQTS and other treatable causes of lethal arrhythmia. Higher levels of risk for cardiac arrest are associated with female sex, more significant QT prolongation, history of unexplained syncope (fainting spells), or premature sudden cardiac death. Additionally, individuals with LQTS should avoid certain medications that carry the risk of increasing the severity of this conduction abnormality, such as certain anti-arrhythmics, anti-depressants, and quinolone or macrolide antibiotics.

Although it is not recognized as an inherited condition, Wolff–Parkinson–White syndrome in which an accessory conduction pathway bypassing the atrioventricular node is present and can cause abnormal conduction patterns leading to supraventricular tachycardia, pre-excited atrial fibrillation, and cardiac arrest. Ebstein's anomaly has an increased risk of accessory pathways as well.

=== Non-cardiac causes ===
Non-cardiac causes account for 15 to 25% of cardiac arrests. Common non-cardiac causes include respiratory arrest, diabetes, certain medications, and blunt trauma (especially to the chest).

- Respiratory arrest will be followed by cardiac arrest unless promptly treated. Respiratory arrest can be caused by pulmonary embolus, choking, drowning, trauma, drug overdose, and poisoning. Pulmonary embolus carries a high mortality rate and may be the triggering cause for up to 5% of cardiac arrests, according to a retrospective study from an urban tertiary care emergency department.
- Diabetes-related factors contributing to cardiac arrest include silent myocardial ischemia, nervous system dysfunction, and electrolyte disturbances leading to abnormal cardiac repolarization.
- Certain medications can worsen an existing arrhythmia. Some examples include antibiotics like macrolides, diuretics, and heart medications such as anti-arrhythmic medications.

Additional non-cardiac causes include hemorrhage, aortic rupture, hypovolemic shock, pulmonary embolism, poisoning such as from the stings of certain jellyfish, and electrical injury.

Circadian patterns are also recognized as triggering factors in cardiac arrest. Per a 2021 systematic review, throughout the day there are two main peak times in which cardiac arrest occurs. The first is in the morning hours and the second is in the afternoon. Moreover, survival rates following cardiac arrest were lowest when occurring between midnight and 6am.

Many of these non-cardiac causes of cardiac arrest are reversible. A common mnemonic used to recall the reversible causes of cardiac arrest is referred to as the Hs and Ts. The Hs are hypovolemia, hypoxia, hydrogen cation excess (acidosis), hyperkalemia, hypokalemia, hypothermia, and hypoglycemia. The Ts are toxins, (cardiac) tamponade, tension pneumothorax, thrombosis (myocardial infarction), thromboembolism, and trauma.

=== Mechanism ===
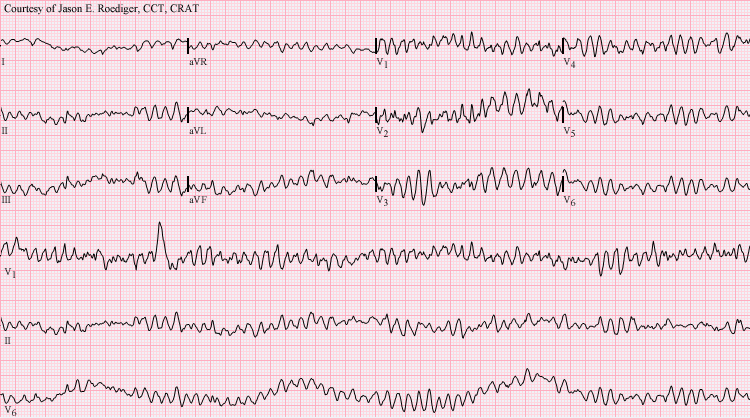
Ventricular fibrillation

The definitive electrical mechanisms of cardiac arrest, which may arise from any of the functional, structural, or physiologic abnormalities mentioned above, are characterized by arrhythmias. Ventricular fibrillation and pulseless or sustained ventricular tachycardia are the most commonly recorded arrhythmias preceding cardiac arrest. These are rapid and erratic arrhythmias that alter the circulatory pathway such that adequate blood flow cannot be sustained and is inadequate to meet the body's needs.

The mechanism responsible for the majority of sudden cardiac deaths is ventricular fibrillation. Ventricular fibrillation is a tachyarrhythmia characterized by turbulent electrical activity in the ventricular myocardium leading to a heart rate too disorganized and rapid to produce any meaningful cardiac output, thus resulting in insufficient perfusion of the brain and essential organs. Some of the electrophysiologic mechanisms underpinning ventricular fibrillations include ectopic automaticity, re-entry, and triggered activity. However, structural changes in the diseased heart as a result of inherited factors (mutations in ion-channel coding genes, for example) cannot explain the sudden onset of cardiac arrest.

In ventricular tachycardia, the heart also beats faster than normal, which may prevent the heart chambers from properly filling with blood. Ventricular tachycardia is characterized by an altered QRS complex and a heart rate greater than 100 beats per minute. When V-tach is sustained (lasts for at least 30 seconds), inadequate blood flow to heart tissue can lead to cardiac arrest.

Bradyarrhythmias occur following dissociation of spontaneous electrical conduction and the mechanical function of the heart resulting in pulseless electrical activity (PEA) or through complete absence of electrical activity of the heart resulting in asystole. Similar to the result of tachyarrhythmias, these conditions lead to an inability to sustain adequate cardiac output.

== Diagnosis ==
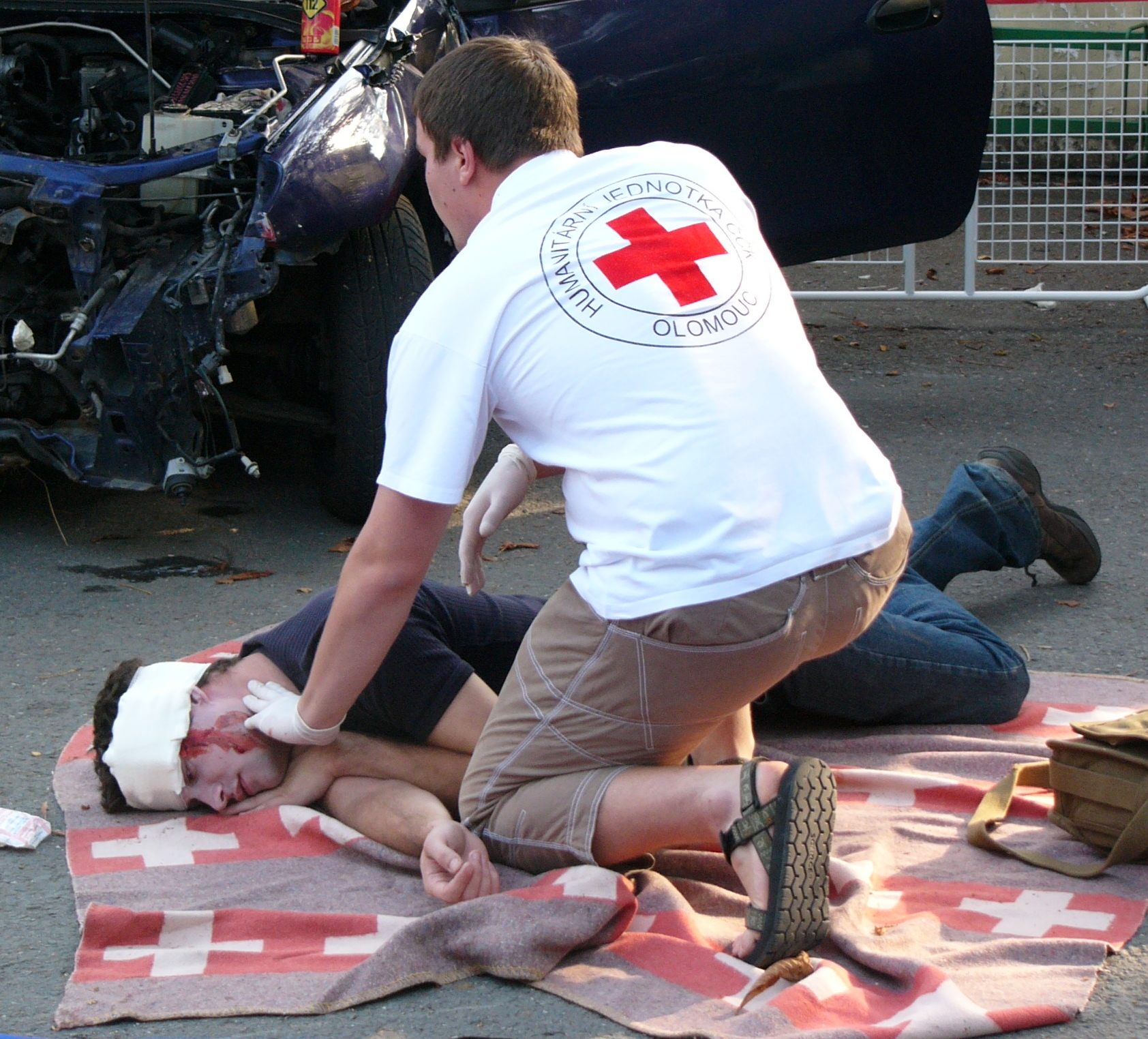
Medical personnel checking the carotid pulse of a simulated patient

Cardiac arrest is synonymous with clinical death. The physical examination to diagnose cardiac arrest focuses on the absence of a pulse. In many cases, lack of a central pulse (carotid arteries and/or femoral arteries) is the gold standard. Lack of a pulse in the periphery (radial/pedal) may also result from other conditions (e.g. shock) or be the rescuer's misinterpretation.

Obtaining a thorough history can help inform the potential cause and prognosis. The provider taking the person's clinical history should try to learn whether the episode was observed by anyone else, when it happened, what the patient was doing (in particular whether there was any trauma), and whether drugs were involved.

During resuscitation efforts, continuous monitoring equipment including EKG leads should be attached to the patient so that providers can analyze the electrical activity of the cardiac cycle and use this information to guide the management efforts. EKG readings will help to identify the arrhythmia present and allow the team to monitor any changes that occur with the administration of CPR and defibrillation. Clinicians classify cardiac arrest into "shockable" versus "non-shockable", as determined by the EKG rhythm. This refers to whether a particular class of cardiac dysrhythmia is treatable using defibrillation. The two "shockable" rhythms are ventricular fibrillation and pulseless ventricular tachycardia, while the two "non-shockable" rhythms are asystole and pulseless electrical activity. Moreover, in the post-resuscitation patient, a 12-lead EKG can help identify some causes of cardiac arrest, such as STEMI which may require specific treatments.

Point-of-care ultrasound (POCUS) is a tool that can be used to examine the movement of the heart and its force of contraction at the patient's bedside. POCUS can accurately diagnose cardiac arrest in hospital settings, as well as visualize cardiac wall motion contractions. Using POCUS, clinicians can have limited, two-dimensional views of different parts of the heart during arrest. These images can help clinicians determine whether electrical activity within the heart is pulseless or pseudo-pulseless, as well as help them diagnose the potentially reversible causes of an arrest. Published guidelines from the American Society of Echocardiography, American College of Emergency Physicians, European Resuscitation Council, and the American Heart Association, as well as the 2018 preoperative Advanced Cardiac Life Support guidelines, have recognized the potential benefits of using POCUS in diagnosing and managing cardiac arrest.

POCUS can help predict outcomes in resuscitation efforts. Specifically, use of transthoracic ultrasound can be a helpful tool in predicting mortality in cases of cardiac arrest, with a systematic review from 2020 finding that there is a significant positive correlation between presence of cardiac motion and short term survival with CPR.

Owing to the inaccuracy diagnosis solely based on central pulse detection, some bodies like the European Resuscitation Council have de-emphasized its importance. Instead, the current guidelines prompt individuals to begin CPR on any unconscious person with absent or abnormal breathing. The Resuscitation Council in the United Kingdom stands in line with the European Resuscitation Council's recommendations and those of the American Heart Association. They have suggested that the technique to check carotid pulses should be used only by healthcare professionals with specific training and expertise, and even then that it should be viewed in conjunction with other indicators like agonal respiration.

Various other methods for detecting circulation and therefore diagnosing cardiac arrest have been proposed. Guidelines following the 2000 International Liaison Committee on Resuscitation recommendations were for rescuers to look for "signs of circulation" but not specifically the pulse. These signs included coughing, gasping, color, twitching, and movement. Per evidence that these guidelines were ineffective, the current International Liaison Committee on Resuscitation recommendation is that cardiac arrest should be diagnosed in all casualties who are unconscious and not breathing normally, a similar protocol to that which the European Resuscitation Council has adopted. In a non-acute setting where the patient is expired, diagnosis of cardiac arrest can be done via molecular autopsy or postmortem molecular testing, which uses a set of molecular techniques to find the ion channels that are cardiac defective. This could help elucidate the cause of death in the patient.

Other physical signs or symptoms can help determine the potential cause of the cardiac arrest. Below is a chart of the clinical findings and signs/symptoms a person may have and potential causes associated with them.

Physical findings related to potential causes
Location	Findings	Possible causes
General	Pale skin	Hemorrhage
	Decreased body temperature	Hypothermia
Airway	Presence of secretions, vomit, blood	Aspiration
	Inability to provide positive pressure ventilation	Tension pneumothorax Airway obstruction
Neck	Distension of the neck veins	Tension pneumothorax Cardiac tamponade Pulmonary embolism
	Trachea shifted to one side	Tension pneumothorax
Chest	Scar in the middle of the sternum	Cardiac disease
Lungs	Breath sounds only on one side	Tension pneumothorax Right mainstem intubation Aspiration
	No breath sounds or distant breath sounds	Esophageal intubation Airway obstruction
	Wheezing	Aspiration Bronchospasm Pulmonary edema
	Rales	Aspiration Pulmonary edema Pneumonia
Heart	Decreased heart sounds	Hypovolemia Cardiac tamponade Tension pneumothorax Pulmonary embolus
Abdomen	Distended and dull	Ruptured abdominal aortic aneurysm Ruptured ectopic pregnancy
	Distended and tympanic	Esophageal intubation
Rectal	Blood present	Gastrointestinal hemorrhage
Extremities	Asymmetrical pulses	Aortic dissection
Skin	Needle tracks	Drug abuse

== Prevention ==
=== Primary prevention ===
With the lack of positive outcomes following cardiac arrest, efforts have been spent finding effective strategies to prevent cardiac arrest events. The approach to primary prevention promotes a healthy diet, exercise, limited alcohol consumption, and smoking cessation.

Exercise is an effective preventative measure for cardiac arrest in the general population but may be risky for those with pre-existing conditions. The risk of a transient catastrophic cardiac event increases in individuals with heart disease during and immediately after exercise. The lifetime and acute risks of cardiac arrest are decreased in people with heart disease who perform regular exercise, perhaps suggesting the benefits of exercise outweigh the risks.

A 2021 study found that diet may be a modifiable risk factor for a lower incidence of sudden cardiac death. The study found that those who fell under the category of having "Southern [United States] diets" representing those of "added fats, fried food, eggs, organ and processed meats, and sugar-sweetened beverages" had a positive association with an increased risk of cardiac arrest, while those deemed following the "Mediterranean diets" had an inverse relationship regarding the risk of cardiac arrest. According to a 2012 review published, omega-3 PUFA supplementation is not associated with a lower risk of sudden cardiac death.

A Cochrane review published in 2016 found moderate-quality evidence to show that blood pressure-lowering drugs do not reduce the risk of sudden cardiac death.

In certain high-risk patient populations, implantable cardioverter-defibrillators (ICD) are also used to prevent sudden cardiac death. Such conditions include the inherited arrhythmias (long QT syndrome, Brugada syndrome, etc) and heart failure.

=== Secondary prevention ===
Illustration of an implantable cardioverter-defibrillator (ICD)

An implantable cardioverter-defibrillator (ICD) is a battery-powered device that monitors electrical activity in the heart, and when an arrhythmia is detected, can deliver an electrical shock to terminate the abnormal rhythm. ICDs are used to prevent sudden cardiac death (SCD) in those who have survived a prior episode of sudden cardiac arrest (SCA) due to ventricular fibrillation or ventricular tachycardia.

Numerous studies have been conducted on the use of ICDs for the secondary prevention of SCD. These studies have shown improved survival with ICDs compared to the use of anti-arrhythmic drugs. ICD therapy is associated with a 50% relative risk reduction in death caused by an arrhythmia and a 25% relative risk reduction in all-cause mortality.

Prevention of SCD with ICD therapy for high-risk patient populations has similarly shown improved survival rates in several large studies. The high-risk patient populations in these studies were defined as those with severe ischemic cardiomyopathy (determined by a reduced left ventricular ejection fraction (LVEF)). The LVEF criteria used in these trials ranged from less than or equal to 30% in MADIT-II to less than or equal to 40% in MUSTT.

Alternatively, a wearable cardioverter defibrillator (eg, LifeVest) can be used instead of an implantable defibrillator, and the wearable option can be used as a temporary bridge to an implantable device. Such instances are endocarditis where an implantable device is at high risk of becoming infected if implanted too soon.

=== Crash teams ===
In hospital, a cardiac arrest is referred to as a "crash", or a "code". This typically refers to code blue on the hospital emergency codes. A dramatic drop in vital sign measurements is referred to as "coding" or "crashing", though coding is usually used when it results in cardiac arrest, while crashing might not. Treatment for cardiac arrest is sometimes referred to as "calling a code".

Patients in general wards often deteriorate for several hours or even days before a cardiac arrest occurs. This has been attributed to a lack of knowledge and skill amongst ward-based staff, in particular, a failure to measure the respiratory rate, which is often the major predictor of a deterioration and can often change up to 48 hours prior to a cardiac arrest. In response, many hospitals now have increased training for ward-based staff. A number of "early warning" systems also exist that aim to quantify the person's risk of deterioration based on their vital signs and thus provide a guide to staff. In addition, specialist staff are being used more effectively to augment the work already being done at the ward level. These include:

- Crash teams (or code teams) – These are designated staff members with particular expertise in resuscitation who are called to the scene of all arrests within the hospital. This usually involves a specialized cart of equipment (including a defibrillator) and drugs called a "crash cart" or "crash trolley".
- Medical emergency teams – These teams respond to all emergencies with the aim of treating people in the acute phase of their illness in order to prevent a cardiac arrest. These teams have been found to decrease the rates of in-hospital cardiac arrest (IHCA) and improve survival.
- Critical care outreach – In addition to providing the services of the other two types of teams, these teams are responsible for educating non-specialist staff. In addition, they help to facilitate transfers between intensive care/high dependency units and the general hospital wards. This is particularly important as many studies have shown that a significant percentage of patients discharged from critical care environments quickly deteriorate and are re-admitted; the outreach team offers support to ward staff to prevent this from happening.

== Management ==
Sudden cardiac arrest may be treated via attempts at resuscitation. This is usually carried out based on basic life support, advanced cardiac life support (ACLS), pediatric advanced life support (PALS), or neonatal resuscitation program (NRP) guidelines.

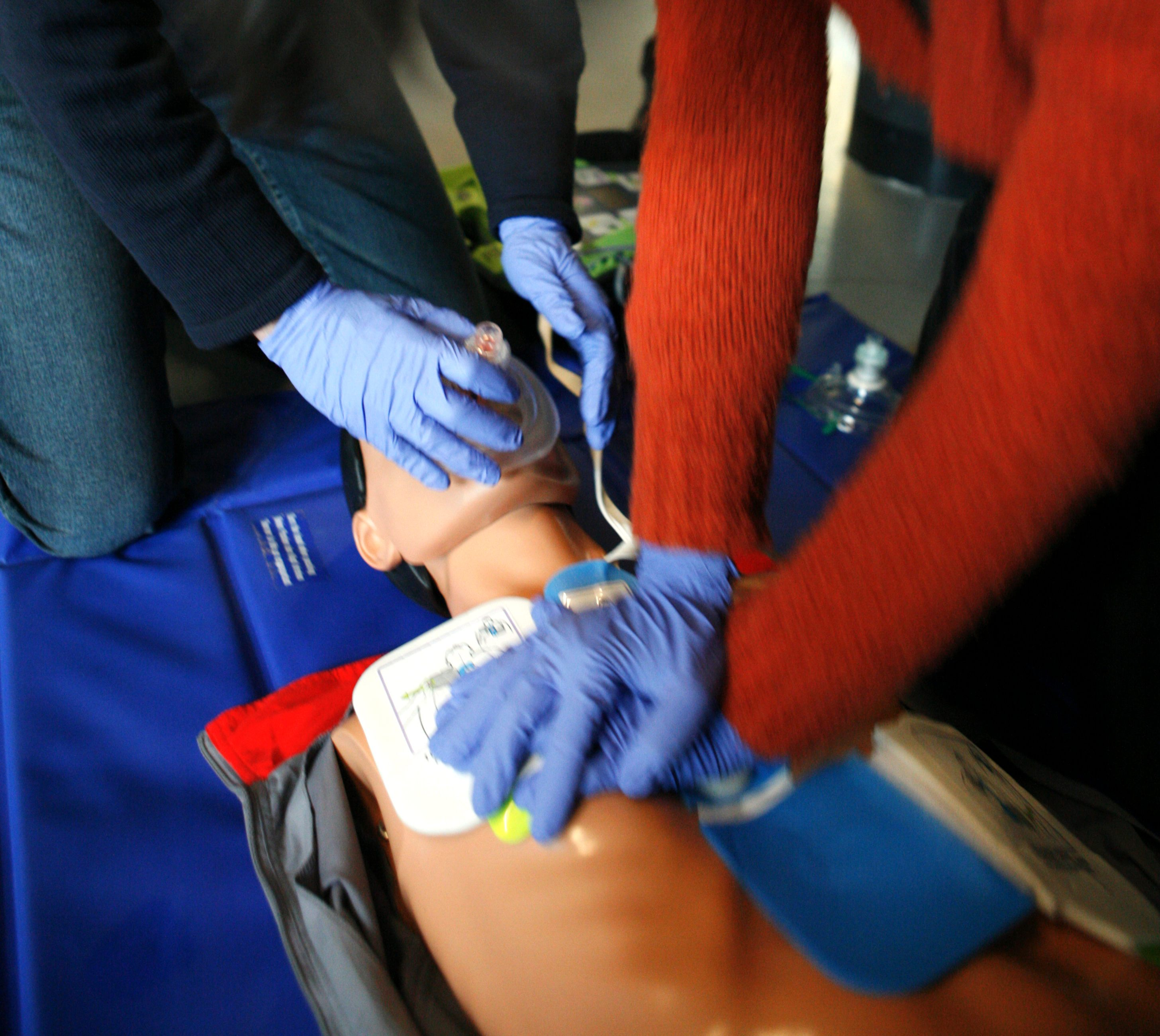
CPR training on a mannequin

=== Cardiopulmonary resuscitation ===
Early cardiopulmonary resuscitation (CPR) is essential to surviving cardiac arrest with good neurological function. It is recommended that it be started as soon as possible with minimal interruptions once begun. The components of CPR that make the greatest difference in survival are chest compressions and defibrillating shockable rhythms. After defibrillation, chest compressions should be continued for two minutes before another rhythm check. This is based on a compression rate of 100-120 compressions per minute, a compression depth of 5–6 centimeters into the chest, full chest recoil, and a ventilation rate of 10 breath ventilations per minute. Mechanical chest compressions (as performed by a machine) are no better than chest compressions performed by hand. It is unclear if a few minutes of CPR before defibrillation results in different outcomes than immediate defibrillation.

Correctly performed bystander CPR has been shown to increase survival, however it is performed in fewer than 30% of out-of-hospital cardiac arrests (OHCAs) as of 2007. A 2019 meta-analysis found that use of dispatcher-assisted CPR improved outcomes, including survival, when compared with undirected bystander CPR. Likewise, a 2022 systematic review on exercise-related cardiac arrests supported early intervention of bystander CPR and AED use (for shockable rhythms) as they improve survival outcomes.

If high-quality CPR has not resulted in return of spontaneous circulation and the person's heart rhythm is in asystole, stopping CPR and pronouncing the person's death is generally reasonable after 20 minutes. Exceptions to this include certain cases with hypothermia or drowning victims. Some of these cases should have longer and more sustained CPR until they are nearly normothermic.

If cardiac arrest occurs after 20 weeks of pregnancy, the uterus should be pulled or pushed to the left during CPR. If a pulse has not returned by four minutes, an emergency Cesarean section is recommended.

=== Airway management ===
High levels of oxygen are generally given during CPR. Either a bag valve mask or an advanced airway may be used to help with breathing particularly since vomiting and regurgitation are common, especially in OHCA. If this occurs, then modification to existing oropharyngeal suction may be required, such as using suction-assisted airway management.

Tracheal intubation has not been found to improve survival rates or neurological outcomes in cardiac arrest, and in the prehospital environment, may worsen it. Endotracheal tubes and supraglottic airways appear equally useful.

Mouth-to-mouth as a means of providing respirations to the person has been phased out due to the risk of contracting infectious diseases from the affected person.

When done by emergency medical personnel, 30 compressions followed by two breaths appear to be better than continuous chest compressions and breaths being given while compressions are ongoing. For bystanders, CPR that involves only chest compressions results in better outcomes as compared to standard CPR for those who have gone into cardiac arrest due to heart issues.

=== Defibrillation ===
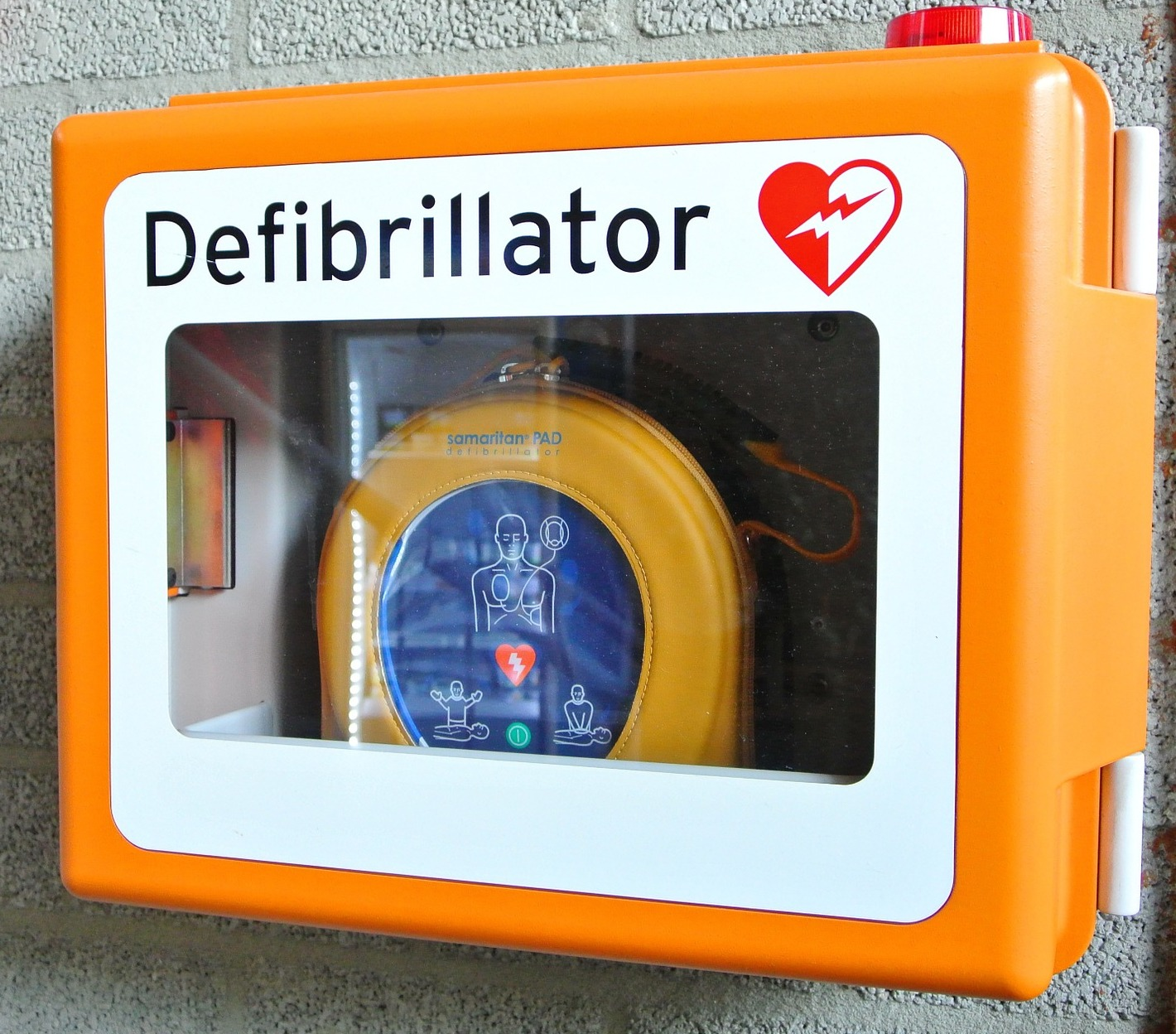
An automated external defibrillator stored in a visible orange mural support

Defibrillation is indicated if a shockable rhythm is present; the two shockable rhythms are ventricular fibrillation and ventricular tachycardia. These shockable rhythms have a 25-40% likelihood of survival, compared with a significantly lower rate (less than 5%) in non-shockable rhythms. The non-shockable rhythms include asystole and pulseless electrical activity.

Ventricular fibrillation involves the ventricles of the heart rapidly contracting in an disorganized pattern, and thereby limiting blood flow from the heart. This is due to an uncoordinated electrical activity. The electrocardiogram (ECG) shows irregular QRS complexes at a very high rate (>300 beats per minute). In ventricular tachycardia, the ECG will show a wide complex rhythm at a rate higher than 100 beats per minute. These two rhythm lead to hemodynamic instability and compromise, resulting in poor perfusion to vital organs (including the heart itself).

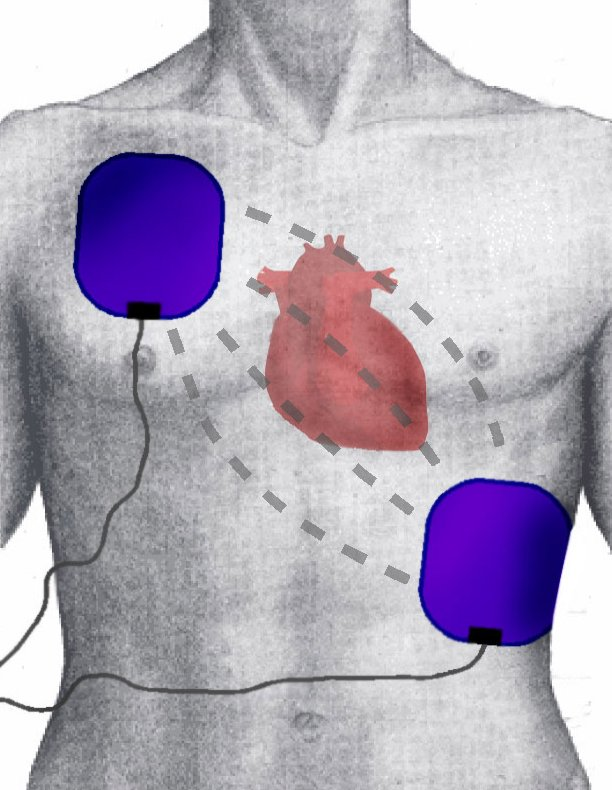
Demonstration of anterolateral pad placement for defibrillation

A defibrillator — either implanted or external — delivers an electrical current that results in the entire myocardium simultaneously depolarized thereby stopping the arrhythmia. Defibrillators can deliver energy as monophasic or biphasic waveforms, although biphasic defibrillators are now the most common. Prior studies suggest that biphasic shock is more likely to produce successful defibrillation after a single shock, however rate of survival is comparable between the methods.

In out-of-hospital arrests (OHCA), the defibrillation is often made by an automated external defibrillator (AED), a portable machine that can be used by any user. The AED provides voice instructions that guide the process, automatically checks the person's condition, and applies the appropriate electric shocks. Some defibrillators even provide feedback on the quality of CPR compressions, encouraging the lay rescuer to press the person's chest hard enough to circulate blood.

There is increasing use of public access to defibrillators. This typically involves placing AEDs in publicly-accessible places and training staff in these areas on how to use them. This allows defibrillation to occur prior to the arrival of emergency services, which has been shown to increase the chances of survival. People who have cardiac arrests in remote locations have worse outcomes.

Defibrillation cannot reverse asystole or pulseless electrical activity, and CPR must be initiated first in these cases. A similar concept, cardioversion, utilizes the same defibrillation machine but is used for other rhythms such as atrial fibrillation and supraventricular tachycardia. In these rhythms, the machine is "synchronized" to the QRS complex to avoid shocking on the T wave (and inducing VT or VF). Cardioversion can be done electively for rhythm control, or urgently if the rhythm is unstable.

=== Medications ===
Medications recommended in the ACLS protocol include epinephrine, amiodarone, and lidocaine. The timing and administration of these medications depends on the underlying arrhythmia of the arrest.

Epinephrine acts on the alpha-1 receptor, which in turn increases the blood flow that supplies the heart. Epinephrine in adults improves survival but does not appear to improve neurologically normal survival. In ventricular fibrillation and pulseless ventricular tachycardia, 1 mg of epinephrine is given every 3–5 minutes, following an initial round of CPR and defibrillation. Doses higher than 1 mg of epinephrine are not recommended for routine use in cardiac arrest. If the person has a non-shockable rhythm, such as asystole, following an initial round of CPR, 1 mg of epinephrine should be given every 3–5 minutes, with the goal of obtaining a shockable rhythm.

Amiodarone and lidocaine are anti-arrhythmic medications. Amiodarone is a class III antiarrhythmic. Amiodarone may be used in cases of ventricular fibrillation, ventricular tachycardia, and wide complex tachycardia. Lidocaine is a Class IB anti-arrhythmic, also used to manage acute arrhythmias. Anti-arrhythmic medications may be used after an unsuccessful defibrillation attempt. However, neither lidocaine nor amiodarone improves survival to hospital discharge, despite both equally improving survival to hospital admission. The first dose is given as a 300 mg bolus. The second dose is given as a 600 mg bolus.

=== Additional medications ===
Bicarbonate, given as sodium bicarbonate, works to stabilize acidosis and hyperkalemia, both of which can contribute to and exacerbate cardiac arrest. If acid-base or electrolyte disturbance is evident, bicarbonate may be used. However, if there is little suspicion that these imbalances are occurring and contributing to the arrest, routine use of bicarbonate is not recommended as it does not provide additional benefit.

Calcium, given as calcium chloride, works as an inotrope and vasopressor. Calcium is used in specific circumstances such as electrolyte disturbances (hyperkalemia) and calcium-channel blocker toxicity. Overall, calcium is not routinely used during cardiac arrest as it does not provide additional benefit (compared to non-use) and may even cause harm (poor neurologic outcomes).

Vasopressin overall does not improve or worsen outcomes compared to epinephrine. The combination of epinephrine, vasopressin, and methylprednisolone appears to improve outcomes.

The use of atropine, lidocaine, and amiodarone have not been shown to improve survival from cardiac arrest.

Atropine is used for symptomatic bradycardia. It is given at a dose of 1 mg (iv), and additional 1 mg (iv) doses can be given every 3–5 minutes for a total of 3 mg. However, the 2010 guidelines from the American Heart Association removed the recommendation for atropine use in pulseless electrical activity and asystole for lack of evidence supporting its use.

=== Special considerations ===
Hemodialysis patients carry a greater risk of cardiac arrest events. Multiple factors contribute including increased cardiovascular risk factors, electrolyte disturbances (calcium and potassium, caused by accumulation and aggressive removal), and acid-base disturbances. Calcium levels are considered a key factor contributing to cardiac arrests in this population.

Tricyclic antidepressant (TCA) overdose can lead to cardiac arrest with typical ECG findings including wide QRS and prolonged QTc. Treatment for this condition includes activated charcoal and sodium bicarbonate.

Magnesium can be given at a dose of 2 g (iv or oral bolus) to manage torsades de points. However, without specific indication, magnesium is not generally given in cardiac arrest. In people with a confirmed pulmonary embolism as the cause of arrest, thrombolytics may be of benefit. Evidence for use of naloxone in those with cardiac arrest due to opioids is unclear, but it may still be used. In people with cardiac arrest due to a local anesthetic, lipid emulsion may be used.

=== Targeted temperature management ===
Current international guidelines suggest cooling adults after cardiac arrest using targeted temperature management (TTM) with the goal of improving neurological outcomes. The process involves cooling for a 24-hour period, with a target temperature of 32–36 °C (90–97 °F), followed by gradual rewarming over the next 12 to 24 hrs. There are several methods used to lower the body temperature, such as applying ice packs or cold-water circulating pads directly to the body or infusing cold saline.

The effectiveness of TTM after OHCA is an area of ongoing study. Several recent reviews have found that patients treated with TTM have more favorable neurological outcomes. However, pre-hospital TTM after OHCA has been shown to increase the risk of adverse outcomes. The rates of re-arrest may be higher in people who were treated with pre-hospital TTM. Moreover, TTM may have adverse neurological effects in people who survive post-cardiac arrest. Osborn waves on ECG are frequent during TTM, particularly in patients treated with 33 °C. Osborn waves are not associated with increased risk of ventricular arrhythmia, and may be considered a benign physiological phenomenon, associated with lower mortality in univariable analyses.

=== Do not resuscitate ===
Some people choose to avoid aggressive measures at the end of life. A do not resuscitate order (DNR) in the form of an advance health care directive makes it clear that in the event of cardiac arrest, the person does not wish to receive cardiopulmonary resuscitation. Other directives may be made to stipulate the desire for intubation in the event of respiratory failure or, if comfort measures are all that are desired, by stipulating that healthcare providers should "allow natural death".

=== Chain of survival ===
Several organizations promote the idea of a chain of survival. The chain consists of the following "links":

- Early recognition. If possible, recognition of illness before the person develops a cardiac arrest will allow the rescuer to prevent its occurrence. Early recognition that a cardiac arrest has occurred is key to survival, for every minute a patient stays in cardiac arrest, their chances of survival drop by roughly 10%.
- Early CPR improves the flow of blood and of oxygen to vital organs, an essential component of treating a cardiac arrest. In particular, by keeping the brain supplied with oxygenated blood, the chances of neurological damage are decreased.
- Early defibrillation is effective for the management of ventricular fibrillation and pulseless ventricular tachycardia.
- Early advanced care.
- Early post-resuscitation care, which may include percutaneous coronary intervention.

If one or more links in the chain are missing or delayed, then the chances of survival drop significantly.

These protocols are often initiated by a code blue, which usually denotes impending or acute onset of cardiac arrest or respiratory failure.

=== Other ===
Resuscitation with extracorporeal membrane oxygenation devices has been attempted with better results for in-hospital cardiac arrest (29% survival) than OHCA (4% survival) in populations selected to benefit most.

Cardiac catheterization in those who have survived an OHCA appears to improve outcomes, although high-quality evidence is lacking. It is recommended to be done as soon as possible in those who have had a cardiac arrest with ST elevation due to underlying heart problems.

The precordial thump may be considered in those with witnessed, monitored, unstable ventricular tachycardia (including pulseless VT) if a defibrillator is not immediately ready for use, but it should not delay CPR and shock delivery or be used in those with unwitnessed OHCA.

== Prognosis ==
The overall rate of survival among those who have OHCA is 10%. Among those who have an OHCA, 70% occur at home, and their survival rate is 6%. For those who have an in-hospital cardiac arrest (IHCA), the survival rate one year from at least the occurrence of cardiac arrest is estimated to be 13%. For IHCA, survival to discharge is around 22%. Those who survive to return of spontaneous circulation and hospital admission frequently present with post-cardiac arrest syndrome, which usually presents with neurological injury that can range from mild memory problems to coma. One-year survival is estimated to be higher in people with cardiac admission diagnoses (39%) when compared to those with non-cardiac admission diagnoses (11%).

A 1997 review found rates of survival to discharge of 14%, although different studies varied from 0 to 28%. In those over the age of 70 who have a cardiac arrest while in hospital, survival to hospital discharge is less than 20%. How well these individuals manage after leaving the hospital is not clear.

The global rate of people who were able to recover from OHCA after receiving CPR has been found to be approximately 30%, and the rate of survival to discharge from the hospital has been estimated at 9%. Survival to discharge from the hospital is more likely among people whose cardiac arrest was witnessed by a bystander or emergency medical services, who received bystander CPR, and who live in Europe and North America. Relatively lower survival to hospital discharge rates have been observed in Asian countries.

Prognosis is typically assessed 72 hours or more after cardiac arrest. Rates of survival are better in those who had someone witness their collapse, received bystander CPR or had either V-fib or V-tach when assessed. Survival among those with V-fib or V-tach is 15 to 23%. Women are more likely to survive cardiac arrest and leave the hospital than men. Hypoxic ischemic brain injury is a concerning outcome for people suffering a cardiac arrest. Most improvements in cognition occur during the first three months following cardiac arrest, with some individuals reporting improvement up to one year post-cardiac arrest. 50 – 70% of cardiac arrest survivors report fatigue as a symptom.

== Epidemiology ==
=== United States ===
The risk of cardiac arrest varies with geographical region, age, and gender. The lifetime risk is three times greater in men (12.3%) than women (4.2%) based on analysis of the Framingham Heart Study. This gender difference disappeared beyond 85 years of age. Around half of these individuals are younger than 65 years of age.

Based on death certificates, sudden cardiac death accounts for about 20% of all deaths in the United States. In the United States, approximately 326,000 cases of out-of-hospital and 209,000 cases of IHCA occur among adults annually, which works out to be an incidence of approximately 110.8 per 100,000 adults per year.

In the United States, during-pregnancy cardiac arrest occurs in about one in twelve-thousand deliveries or 1.8 per 10,000 live births. Rates are lower in Canada.

=== Other regions ===
Non-Western regions of the world have differing incidences. The incidence of sudden cardiac death in China is 41.8 per 100,000 and in South India is 39.7 per 100,000.

== Society and culture ==
=== Names ===
In many publications, the stated or implicit meaning of "sudden cardiac death" is sudden death from cardiac causes. Some physicians call cardiac arrest "sudden cardiac death" even if the person survives. Thus one can hear mentions of "prior episodes of sudden cardiac death" in a living person.

In 2021, the American Heart Association clarified that "heart attack" is often mistakenly used to describe cardiac arrest. While a heart attack refers to death of heart muscle tissue as a result of blood supply loss, cardiac arrest is caused when the heart's electrical system malfunctions. Furthermore, the American Heart Association explains that "if corrective measures are not taken rapidly, this condition progresses to sudden death. Cardiac arrest should be used to signify an event as described above, that is reversed, usually by CPR and/or defibrillation or cardioversion, or cardiac pacing. Sudden cardiac death should not be used to describe events that are not fatal".

=== Slow code ===
A "slow code" is a slang term for the practice of deceptively delivering sub-optimal CPR to a person in cardiac arrest, when CPR is considered to have no medical benefit. A "show code" is the practice of faking the response altogether for the sake of the person's family.

Such practices are ethically controversial and are banned in some jurisdictions. The European Resuscitation Council Guidelines released a statement in 2021 that clinicians are not suggested to participate/take part in "slow codes". According to the American College of Physicians, half-hearted resuscitation efforts are deceptive and should not be performed by physicians or nurses.

== Children ==
In children, the most common cause of cardiac arrest is shock or respiratory failure that has not been treated. Cardiac arrhythmias are another possible cause. Arrhythmias such as asystole or bradycardia are more likely in children, in contrast to ventricular fibrillation or tachycardia as seen in adults.

Additional causes of sudden unexplained cardiac arrest in children include hypertrophic cardiomyopathy and coronary artery abnormalities. In childhood hypertrophic cardiomyopathy, previous adverse cardiac events, non-sustained ventricular tachycardia, syncope, and left ventricular hypertrophy have been shown to predict sudden cardiac death. Other causes can include drugs, such as cocaine and methamphetamine, or overdose of medications, such as antidepressants.

For management of pediatric cardiac arrest, CPR should be initiated if suspected. Guidelines provide algorithms for pediatric cardiac arrest management. Recommended medications during pediatric resuscitation include epinephrine, lidocaine, and amiodarone. However, the use of sodium bicarbonate or calcium is not recommended. The use of calcium in children has been associated with poor neurological function as well as decreased survival. Correct dosing of medications in children is dependent on weight, and to minimize time spent calculating medication doses, the use of a Broselow tape is recommended.

Rates of survival in children with cardiac arrest are 3 to 16% in North America.

== See also ==
- Heart block
- Arrhythmia
- Angina
- Chain of survival
- Post-cardiac arrest syndrome
- Rearrest
- Sam Parnia
- Sudden cardiac death of athletes
