= Call-Push-Shock =

Call-Push-Shock (CPS) is a national collaborative movement co-sponsored by Parent Heart Watch (PHW) and Sudden Cardiac Arrest Foundation (SCAF). It is designed to drive public awareness, understanding, and action in cases of out-of-hospital cardiac arrest and increase survival rates by speaking in one voice across multiple organizations. CPS urges the public, when it witnesses sudden cardiac arrest, to call 911, provide CPR, and use an automated external defibrillator (AED), if available.

The CPS concept is based on consumer research conducted by StrataVerve for SCAF. This research also led to development of tested definition of sudden cardiac arrest written at an 8th grade level.

CPS was developed in response to a 2015 report from a workshop hosted by the Institute of Medicine (now the National Academy of Medicine). Among other things, the IOM report recommended crystallizing messaging to promote public awareness; using a singular, simple, concise, easy-to communicate, and compelling message; establishing a public awareness campaign; and establishing a cardiac arrest collaborative.

PHW and SCAF launched CPS in June 2018 during National CPR-AED Awareness Week. More than 50 organizations have joined CPS since its inception, including the Centers for Disease Control and Prevention.

An abstract on CPS was published by the American Heart Association in 2019.
