= Rearrest =

ROSC and rearrest in an ECG signal

Rearrest (also known as refibrillation or recurrent ventricular fibrillation) is a phenomenon that involves the resumption of a lethal cardiac dysrhythmia after successful return of spontaneous circulation (ROSC) has been achieved during the course of resuscitation. Survival to hospital discharge rates are as low as 7% for cardiac arrest in general and although treatable, rearrest may worsen these survival chances. Rearrest commonly occurs in the out-of-hospital setting under the treatment of health care providers.

== Cause ==
Rearrest, which may have a similar etiology to cardiac arrest, is characterized as a compromise in the electrical activity of the heart often due to an ischemic event. The post-arrest patient who has recently obtained pulses, is dependent on prehospital care providers for ventilation assistance, arrhythmia correction through medication and blood pressure monitoring. Therefore, insufficient care in any of these treatments may contribute to a rearrest event.

The lethal arrhythmia may be either ventricular fibrillation, ventricular tachycardia or asystole.

A strong suspect that may be a critical contributor to rearrest is the administration of chest compressions to the patient when the patient has already achieved a pulsatile rhythm. It is often difficult to determine the presence of a pulse in a cardiac arrest patient, thus chest compressions may be given by the unaware resuscitator and this added stress on the heart may contribute to a rearrest event.

== Treatment ==
Similar to cardiac arrest, rearrest is treated with cardiopulmonary resuscitation (CPR) and defibrillation using either a manual or automated defibrillator. The goal of treatment is to re-establish a self perfusing heart through correction of the electrical activity within the heart. CPR entails chest compressions along with rescue breaths, while defibrillation involves a biphasic shock across the chest with the purpose of restarting the electrical activity of the heart.

Anti-arrythmic drugs are commonly given during the ROSC phase. These drugs may include lidocaine and amiodarone.

== Prognosis ==
Rearrest may reduce the likelihood of survival when compared to patients who have had just one episode of cardiac arrest. Overall resuscitation rates have been estimated to be about 34%, however survival to hospital discharge rates are as low as 7%. This phenomenon may be contributed to rearrest.

== Epidemiology ==
A recent study by Salcido et al. (2010) ascertained rearrest in all initial and rearrest rhythms treated by any level of Emergency Medical Service (EMS), finding a rearrest rate of 36% and a lower but not significantly different rate of survival to hospital discharge in cases with rearrest compared to those without rearrest.

== Research ==
Current research seeks to predict the event of rearrest after patients have already achieved ROSC. Biosignals, such as electrocardiogram (ECG), have the potential to predict the onset of rearrest and are currently being investigated to preemptively warn health care providers that rearrest could be imminent.

A stronger pulse detector would also contribute to lowering the rate of rearrest. If the resuscitator could accurately know when the patient has achieved ROSC, there would be less instances of chest compressions being provided when a native pulse is present.
