= Return of spontaneous circulation =

Resumption of a sustained heart rhythm that perfuses the body after cardiac arrest

Return of spontaneous circulation (ROSC) is the resumption of a sustained heart rhythm that perfuses the body after cardiac arrest. It is commonly associated with significant respiratory effort. Signs of return of spontaneous circulation include breathing, coughing, or movement and a palpable pulse or a measurable blood pressure. Someone is considered to have sustained return of spontaneous circulation when circulation persists and cardiopulmonary resuscitation has ceased for at least 20 consecutive minutes.

== Predictors of ROSC ==
There are multiple factors during cardiopulmonary resuscitation (CPR) and defibrillation that are associated with success of achieving return of spontaneous circulation. One of the factors in CPR is the chest compression fraction, which is a measure of how much time during cardiac arrest are chest compressions performed. A study measured the effects of chest compression fraction on return of spontaneous circulation in out-of-hospital cardiac arrest patients with a non-ventricular fibrillation arrhythmia and it showed a trend to achieving return of spontaneous circulation with an increased chest compression fraction. Another study highlighted the benefits of minimizing chest compression intervals before and after shocking a patient's rhythm, which would in turn increase chest compression fraction. A coronary perfusion pressure of 15 mmHg is thought to be the minimum necessary to achieve ROSC.

Pertaining to defibrillation, the presence of a shockable rhythm (ventricular fibrillation or pulseless ventricular tachycardia) is associated with increased chances of return of spontaneous circulation. Although a shockable rhythm increases chances for return of spontaneous circulation, a cardiac arrest can present with pulseless electrical activity or asystole, which are non-shockable cardiac rhythms.

== Prognosis ==
Return of spontaneous circulation can be achieved through cardiopulmonary resuscitation and defibrillation. Though ROSC is necessary for survival, it is not, itself, a predictor of a favorable medium- or long-term outcome. Patients have died not long after their circulation has returned. One study showed that those who had had an out-of-hospital cardiac arrest and had achieved return of spontaneous circulation, 38% of those people had a cardiac re-arrest before arriving at the hospital with an average time of 3 minutes to re-arrest. Patients with sustained ROSC generally present with post-cardiac arrest syndrome (PCAS). Longer time-to-ROSC is associated with a worse presentation of PCAS.

Lazarus phenomenon is the rare spontaneous return of circulation after cardiopulmonary resuscitation attempts have stopped in someone with cardiac arrest. This phenomenon most frequently occurs within 10 minutes of cessation of resuscitation, thus passive monitoring is recommended for 10 minutes following CPR cessation.
