= Daryll Thomann =

American police chief

Daryll Thomann (born 1941) was the chief of police for the city of Placentia in Orange County, California. He joined the department in 1969 as a patrol officer, then oversaw investigations for most of his career. He became acting chief in 1996, during a period of internal turmoil in the department, centering on his predecessor. In 1997, he became the department's chief, overseeing more than 50 officers and about 20 other employees. He held a master's degree in management and began his tenure of chief with efforts to build up his department's Professional Standards Bureau, including efforts to supplement the department's funding with grant writing. In 1998, he launched the county's first police department program of equipping motor and patrol vehicles with automated external defibrillators, which improved response times to cardiac arrest victims, the survival window of cardiac victims being less than seven minutes for administration of defibrillation equipment, with a victim's chance of survival decreasing by 10 percent each minute, and brain damage after 4 to 6 minutes. He was active with the Placentia's Rotary Club and Chamber of Commerce.
