= Drug-resistant epilepsy =

Drug-resistant epilepsy (DRE), also known as refractory epilepsy, intractable epilepsy, or pharmacoresistant epilepsy, refers to a state in which an individual with a diagnosis of epilepsy is unresponsive to multiple first-line therapies. Based on the 2010 guidelines from the International League Against Epilepsy (ILAE), DRE is officially diagnosed following a lack of therapeutic relief in the form of continued seizure burden after trialing at least two antiepileptic drugs (AEDs) at the appropriate dosage and duration. The probability that the next medication will achieve seizure freedom drops with every failed AED. For example, after two failed AEDs, the probability that the third will achieve seizure freedom is around 4%. Drug-resistant epilepsy is commonly diagnosed after several years of uncontrolled seizures; however, in most cases, it is evident much earlier. Approximately 30% of people with epilepsy have a drug-resistant form. Achieving seizure control in DRE patients is critical, as uncontrolled seizures can lead to irreversible damage to the brain, cognitive impairment, and increased risk for sudden unexpected death in epilepsy. Indirect consequences of DRE include seizure-related injuries and accidents, impairment in daily life, adverse medication effects, increased co-morbidities (especially psychological), and increased economic burden.

Some clinical factors that are thought to be predictive of DRE include the female sex, focal epilepsy, developmental delay, status epilepticus, earlier age of onset of epilepsy, neurological deficits, having an abnormal EEG and/or imaging findings, genetic predisposition, association with the ABCB1 gene, and inborn errors of metabolism. Especially among pediatric populations, there is a growing association between DRE and genetic conditions or developmental disorders such as Lennox–Gastaut syndrome or Dravet syndrome.

There are numerous theories regarding the mechanisms of DRE, many of which have been studied in human and other animal models but the exact pathogenesis of the condition is still unclear.

- Transporter Hypothesis: Changes to transporters in the blood-brain barrier lead to decreased effectiveness of AEDs through decreased drug concentration. These changes could be in the form of increased efflux transporters or fewer transporters overall.
- Pharmacokinetic Hypothesis: Changes to transporters (increased efflux) peripherally in places like the intestines influence efficacy of AEDs and ability to ultimately reach target sites in the brain.
- Target Hypothesis: Changes to target protein sites of AEDs influence their effectiveness.
- Intrinsic Severity Hypothesis: Refers to the severity of epilepsy and impact increased seizure burden can have on drug efficacy.
- Gene Variant Hypothesis: AEDs may not be as effective due to inherent genetic variability, whether in transporters, target sites, and/or the specific kind of epilepsy.
- Neural Network Hypothesis: Increased seizure burden may impact the structure of the brain through neural connections, which worsens clinical symptoms and reduces drug efficacy.

== Diagnosis ==
The first step is referral to an epilepsy specialist in a comprehensive epilepsy center where further diagnostic work-up can be performed.

=== Prolonged monitoring ===
One of the first steps in management of drug-resistant epilepsy is confirming the diagnosis by EEG. Typically patients are admitted to hospital for prolonged EEG monitoring with video technology used to capture clinical events as they occur. Typically patients are taken off their anti-seizure medications in order to characterize the evolution of seizure symptoms and their relation with changes in electrical activity of brain. This is done while simultaneously minimizing the adverse consequences of seizures. Additional maneuvers to provoke seizures are also frequently performed, like sleep deprivation, photic stimulation, and hyperventilation. This study can take anywhere from 1–14 days. The length of the study depends on factors like baseline seizure frequency, the number and type of seizure medications the patient is taking prior to the study, institutional protocols, etc. The goal is to record 3-4 typical seizures, though in some cases more or fewer seizures may need to be recorded. After this evaluation, some patients may be determined to have non-epileptic causes of their symptoms, e.g., syncope, psychogenic nonepileptic seizures, cardiac arrhythmia, etc.

For patients who are confirmed to have epilepsy, this testing helps further elucidate the type of epilepsy (generalized vs focal), type of seizures (atonic, absence, GTC, etc.), and can be used for pre-surgical evaluation or to guide further management. Changes on EEG in relation to clinical seizure symptoms are used to determine the likely area of the brain responsible (symptomatic zone) and by extrapolation the area where seizure activity likely starts (seizure onset zone). In some specific cases, prolonged EEG may be done as an outpatient or ambulatory study where the patient goes home with an EEG set-up. This type of monitoring is usually limited to 2–3 days and patients are not taken off their AEDs.

=== Neuroimaging ===
MRI of brain is the most common first-line neuroimaging modality to be used in evaluation of a structural cause of epilepsy. A 3-tesla MRI is generally recommended, as opposed to scanning on lower magnet strengths. MRI for evaluation of epilepsy often include T1 and T2 images that are optimized to appreciate gray-white matter differentiation and oblique coronal images along the axis of hippocampus. Identification of common lesions associated with epilepsy, like focal cortical dysplasia, mesial temporal sclerosis, microencephalocele, and heterotopia, require thorough review of images by trained clinicians, as the changes can be very subtle and easily missed if not specifically evaluated for. Oftentimes, repeat MRI is required to elucidate an etiology to epilepsy, and typically an epilepsy imaging protocol is followed to identify these subtle changes. In some cases, subtle relevant structural abnormalities may only be apparent with quantitative analysis or use of MRI with stronger magnetic fields such as 7-tesla MRI. For example, voxel based morphometry may be used to assist with the detection of focal cortical dysplasia. Additionally, not all structural abnormalities seen on MRI correlate with epilepsy and may represent incidental findings.

Positron emission tomography (PET) using the FDG radiotracer can also be used in evaluation of DRE. Its use in epilepsy evaluation is based on the premise that areas of the brain responsible for seizure onset also have persistent metabolic dysfunction and do not use glucose at the same rate as other areas of the brain. Specifically, during seizure activity (ictal) one would expect a hypermetabolic state with increased radiotracer uptake on PET scan, while in between events (interictal) one would expect a hypometabolic state with lower radiotracer uptake on PET scan. Oftentimes findings on PET scan are often correlated with other diagnostic workup that has already/concurrently been obtained to further localize an epileptogenic area of the brain, particularly in the case of focal epilepsy. Other ligands like ^{11}C-flumazenil, 1^{1}C-alpha-methyl-L-tryptophan, ^{11}C-methionine, have also been used, mostly on research basis to help identify areas of seizure onset.

Single-photon emission computed tomography (SPECT) is another radiotracer based imaging technique that uses an oxygen radio-isotope to assess blood flow in the brain. This imaging is performed during inpatient video EEG monitoring in which the tracer is injected into the patient's bloodstream as soon as a seizure starts. Areas of the brain associated with seizure onset will have increased blood flow, hence increased uptake of the tracer if injected at an appropriate time. Imaging is performed after seizure activity is over to assess areas showing a significant increase in blood flow at seizure onset. A major limitation with this technique is the logistics required when injecting the radiotracer and quality of the images produced.

Magnetoencephalography (MEG): A newer non-invasive imaging technique that measures the magnetic field associated with neuronal firing in the brain. While each individual neuron's magnetic field is undetectable, when neurons are firing concurrently, such as during a seizure, the magnetic field generated is detected via MEG. This data provides real-time brain mapping and has proven to be extremely effective in pre-surgical planning and localization of epilepsy. MEG is particularly useful in detecting more superficial abnormalities and is more sensitive than other imaging modalities.

=== Neuropsychological testing ===
Neuropsychological testing involves a series of tests aimed at assessing higher-order mental functions like memory, executive function, language, overall IQ, etc. in order to establish baseline cognitive function. If there is poor performance in measures of specific cognitive domains like verbal memory, naming, or visual-spatial orientation, it may point to areas of the brain that are dysfunctional and likely related to seizure onset. This testing could also indicate poor performance on most measures and suggest more widespread dysfunction in the brain. Besides helping assess the likely area of seizure onset, this testing can be informative post surgical intervention and/or epilepsy therapy.

=== Language lateralization ===
If epilepsy surgery is being considered, testing is often performed to determine the hemisphere of the brain involved in language and memory function. This helps inform about potential risks to language and memory with surgery. There are two main tests available for this objective: the Wada test and fMRI.

The Wada test has been one of the most commonly used tests around the world since the 1960s. This is an invasive testing technique that requires neurointerventionalists, neuropsychologists, neurophysiologists, EEG technologists, and anesthesiologists. When conducting the Wada test, a catheter is threaded from wrist or groin into the carotid artery and finally the middle cerebral artery. An injection of sodium amytal is given to temporarily anesthetize 2/3rd of the cerebral hemisphere on one side. Neuropsychological testing is then done to assess language and memory function of the other hemisphere. Once the patient is fully recovered from the injection on the first side, the catheter is withdrawn and threaded up the contralateral middle cerebral artery with neuropsychological testing repeated. This testing informs the "reserve" for memory and language function in each hemisphere and the potential for impairment with resective surgery on a given side. In some cases additional testing with selective injection of the posterior cerebral artery (that supplies the mesial temporal region including hippoampus) can be done.

The Wada test is increasingly being replaced by the noninvasive fMRI imaging technique. Functional MRI (fMRI) measures the change in blood flow and oxygenation in different parts of the brain in response to an activity. Different tasks or paradigms are presented to a patient while they are in an MRI scanner. These tasks are designed to activate areas involved in different language functions and post processing of the images helps identify areas that are activated during different language tasks.

== Management ==
While the term drug-resistant epilepsy implies ineffectiveness of pharmacotherapy, recent advances in the pharmaceutical industry have introduced new medications that have proven to be effective in the management of DRE patients. Given their novel nature many of the sources utilized are primary/case studies.

=== Cenobamate ===
Approved by the FDA in 2019 for treatment of epilepsy in adults, cenobamate is primarily used to treat patients with focal onset seizures. The mechanism of action of this drug is unclear, but is likely related to the inactivation of Na Channels and action as a GABA modulator. The dosing range for this drug is anywhere from 100-400 mg with a half-life of 55 hours. There have been at least three separate clinical trials involving cenobamate with results showing a reduction in seizure burden by at least 50% in the experimental groups, especially at higher doses of the drug. Of note, cenobamate can interact with other medications, especially other AEDs, and as such requires medication titration.

=== Fenfluramine ===
This drug was used at high doses as an obesity drug that was later recalled given adverse cardiac effects. Fenfluramine is now approved at lower doses as of 2020 for treatment of seizures in patients 2 years and older with Lennox-Gastaut and Dravet syndrome. Fenfluramine is an amphetamine derivative that acts as a serotonin agonist and on GABA and NMDA receptors. The dosing range is anywhere from 0.2-0.7 mg/kg/day, with higher dosing being the most effective for seizure burden. Among Dravet and LGS patients, it has been shown to be helpful with most seizure types, including atonic, GTC, and tonic. This medication has also been reported to be helpful in behavioral and cognitive symptoms associated with intractable epilepsy. At higher doses there are reports of patients showing improvement in daily executive functioning and emotional regulation. No adverse cardiac events have been reported with the use of fenfluramine for epilepsy treatment, with the main side effects being diarrhea, weight loss, and fatigue.

=== Cannabidiol ===
Cannabidiol has recently been emerging as an effective treatment for epilepsy without the psychoactive effects of the Cannabis sativa plant it is derived from. It gained approval in 2019 for treatment of DRE associated with Dravet, LGS, and more recently seizures associated with tuberous sclerosis in patients over the age of 2 years old. The mechanism of action of cannabidiol is unclear but hypothesized to be related to Ca channels, adenosine signaling, and overall modulation of neuronal hyperexcitability. Cannabidiol is often used concurrently with another AED, especially clobazam, although there is evidence of the efficacy of cannabidiol when used on its own. Some studies suggest the efficacy of cannabidiol for all forms of DRE regardless of the underlying etiology. Similar to fenfluramine, there has been evidence of improvements in cognition, emotional regulation, and communication in addition to seizure control for patients taking cannabidiol.

=== Perampanel ===
First gained approval in the US in 2012 for the treatment of drug-resistant focal epilepsy in patients 12 years and older. It is an antagonist at AMPA receptors with a dosing range from 4-12 mg/day. It is primarily used as an adjunctive treatment option and at higher doses is associated with adverse symptoms like dizziness, ataxias, and withdrawal symptoms. Perampanel has also been studied in the context of sleep and has been shown to help with sleep maintenance and reduction of daytime sleepiness.

== Diets ==
For over 100 years it has been known that a diet with a high fat content and a low carbohydrate content can reduce seizures. Radically curbing carbohydrate intake imitates starvation and forces the body to draw energy from ketone bodies that form when fat is metabolized instead of drawing its energy from sugar. This state is called ketosis and it changes several biochemical processes in the brain in a way that inhibits epileptic activity. On this basis there are several diets that are often recommended to children under 12 years old, but are also effective in adults for DRE management.

=== Ketogenic diet ===
The ketogenic diet is the diet that is most commonly recommended by doctors for patients with epilepsy. In this diet the ratio of fat to carbohydrates and proteins is 4:1. That means that the fat content of the consumed food must be around 80%, the protein content must be around 15%, and the carbohydrate content must be around 5%. For comparison, the average western diet consists of a carbohydrate content of over 50%. After one year on the ketogenic diet, the success rate (seizure reduction over 50%) is between 30 and 50% and the dropout rate is around 45%. Although the ketogenic diet can be very effective, some families report that it's not compatible with daily life given its restrictive nature. It can be especially difficult for adolescents to follow as their autonomy increases. For this reason a fat ratio of 3:1 instead of 4:1 can be recommended to make meals more palatable. Side effects of the ketogenic diet include constipation, fatigue, weight loss, and kidney stones (typically after long-term adherence).

=== MCT diet ===
In the 1960s, it was discovered that when medium-chain triglycerides (MCTs) are metabolized, more ketone bodies are produced than from metabolizing any other fat. This discovery sparked the introduction of the MCT diet, a modification of the ketogenic diet. In the MCT diet, MCT oil is added to ketogenic meals, which allows the carbohydrate content to be increased. The efficacy of the MCT ketogenic diet does not differ significantly from the classic ketogenic diet; however, not all patients, especially pediatric populations, can tolerate the large amounts of MCT oil required. This diet can also be costly.

=== Modified Atkins ===
A modified Atkins diet was coined after the popular Atkins diet with the goal of reducing seizures through ketosis. In this diet, the fat content is slightly lower than in the ketogenic diet at around 60%; the protein content is around 30% and the carbohydrate content is around 10%. Several studies show that the modified Atkins diet is just as effective as the ketogenic diet. Some physicians recommend the modified Atkins diet because they assume that patients will adhere to it on the long-term because it is more compatible with daily life and the meals are more enjoyable.

=== Low glycemic index ===
The aim of the low glycemic index diet is to keep blood glucose levels at a stable state. Rapid fluctuations in glucose levels both high and low is thought to be a trigger for seizures in some patients with epilepsy. This diet permits 40-60 gram of carbohydrates daily but with the goal of a glycemic index of <50. This diet has been studied among pediatric populations as an effective form of management for DRE.

== Surgery ==
In epilepsy surgery, a distinction can be made between resective and disconnective procedures. In a resective procedure, the area of the brain that causes the seizures is removed. In a disconnective procedure, the neural connections in the brain that allow the seizures to spread are disconnected. In most cases, epilepsy surgery is only an option when the area of the brain that causes the seizures – the so-called epileptic focus – can be clearly identified and is not responsible for critical functions such as language. Several imaging techniques such as magnetic resonance tomography and functional techniques like electrocorticography are used to demarcate the epileptic focus clearly. Recording fMRI and EEG simultaneously is a noninvasive method of detecting cerebral hemodynamic changes related to interictal epileptic discharges (IEDs) on scalp EEG. This has been shown through different studies to help diagnose different types of epilepsy.

=== Lobe resection ===
Temporal lobe epilepsy (TLE), in which the epileptic focus is in the temporal lobe, is one of the most common types of epilepsy in adolescents and adults. Hence temporal lobe resection, during which the whole temporal lobe or just a part of the temporal lobe (for example, the hippocampus or the amygdala) is removed, is the most common epilepsy surgery procedure. Between 40 and 60% of patients who undergo temporal lobe resection are continuously seizure-free. The surgery itself is very safe, with a mortality of 0%. The risk for neurologic complications from a temporal lobe resection is around 3 to 7%.

=== Lesionectomy ===
If the source of seizures is a lesion – for example, scar tissue from a brain injury, a tumor, or malformed blood vessels – this lesion can be removed surgically in a lesionectomy.

=== Corpus callosotomy ===
Corpus callosotomy is a palliative procedure for especially severe cases of epilepsy. The corpus callosum is a large bundle of nerve fibers that connects both brain halves with each other. To prevent the spreading of seizures from one brain hemisphere (brain half) to the other, the corpus callosum can be split. This procedure is mostly carried out on patients with so-called drop attacks that come with a very high risk of injury and in which the epileptic focus is not clearly delimitable. It is very rare that a corpus callosotomy causes seizure freedom; however, in half of the patients, the dangerous drop attacks are less severe. After a corpus callosotomy there is the risk that language is temporarily or permanently impaired. The younger a patient is at the time of the corpus callosotomy, the better the prognosis.

=== Functional hemispherectomy ===
This procedure is a modern adaptation of the radical hemispherectomy in which one brain hemisphere is removed to prevent the spread of seizures from one brain hemisphere to the other. In the functional version, only a part of the hemisphere is removed but the connections to the other brain hemisphere are cut through. This procedure is only performed on a small group of patients under the age of 13 who have severe damage or malformation of one hemisphere, patients with Sturge Weber syndrome, or patients with Rasmussen's encephalitis. Surgical intervention is considered a viable option for infants with drug-resistant epilepsy, particularly when anti-seizure medications fail to achieve seizure control. For this population, surgery can lead to favorable outcomes in a substantial number of cases. The functional hemispherectomy can achieve long-term seizure freedom in over 80% of patients, though often at the price of hemiplegia and hemianopsy. The death rate is around 1 to 2%, and 5% of patients develop a hydrocephalus that needs to be treated with a shunt.

=== Multiple subpial transection ===
Multiple subpial transection (MST) is a palliative procedure that is considered when an epileptic focus can be identified but cannot be removed because it is in a functionally relevant brain region – a so-called eloquent region. In an MST, nerve fibers are disconnected so that seizures cannot spread from the epileptic focus into the rest of the brain. Between 60 and 70% of patients experienced a seizure reduction of over 95% after an MST, and the risk for neurologic deficits is around 19%.

=== Vagus nerve stimulation ===
Vagus nerve stimulation (VNS) involves implanting a pacemaker-like generator below the skin in the chest area that intermittently sends electrical impulses to the left vagus nerve in the neck. The impulses are mediated to the brain by the vagus nerve and thereby help to inhibit electrical disturbances that cause seizures. The antiepileptic effect of vagus nerve stimulation increases over several months: after two years, around half of VNS patients experience a reduction of their seizures by at least 50%, and after 10 years, the average seizure reduction is around 75%. Furthermore, in most patients mood (VNS has a significant antidepressant effect and is approved for depression in some countries), alertness and quality of life are increased significantly within the first year of vagus nerve stimulation. VNS patients can induce an extra stimulation themselves with a VNS magnet when they notice that a seizure is approaching, and it has been shown that the majority of seizures can be interrupted with this type of on-demand stimulation.

The procedure to implant a vagus nerve stimulator is very safe: no case of death related to VNS implantation surgery has ever occurred. Infection of the tissue pocket in which the generator is located that requires antibiotic treatment occurs in around 3% of patients. The most common side effect is hoarseness or change in voice. Headaches and shortness of breath are less common. In most cases, side effects only occur during activity of the stimulation (mostly every 3 to 5 minutes) and reduce over time. In most cases, VNS does not replace antiepileptic medication; however, in many cases, the dose can be reduced over time so that patients experience fewer side effects. The battery of the VNS generator can, depending on the model and the settings, last between 3 and 10 years.

=== VNS with cardiac-based seizure detection ===
In 82% of epilepsy patients, the heart rate increases quickly and suddenly upon a seizure. This is known as ictal tachycardia. Ictal tachycardia is so characteristic that it can be distinguished from the slow gradual increase of heart rate that occurs during physical activity. This way, in the majority of epilepsy patients, seizures can be detected in the ECG. In addition to classical VNS, some new VNS generators continuously monitor heart rate and identify fast and sudden heart rate increases associated with seizures with intelligent software. Then an automatic additional stimulation can be triggered to interrupt, prevent or alleviate the seizure. This new generator type was shown to detect and treat at least four out of five seizures and 60% of seizures were shown to be interrupted with this heart-rate triggered stimulation. The earlier in the course of the seizure the stimulation occurred, the quicker the seizure ended; generally, seizures were shown to be reduced by around 35% by stimulation.

=== Other ===
Deep brain stimulation of the anterior nuclei of the thalamus is approved for DRE in some countries in Europe, but has been and continues to only be used in a very few patients. After 5 years of DBS, a seizure reduction of 69% and a 50%-responder rate of 68% was reported in a randomized-double blinded trial. The rate of serious device related events was 34% in this study.

Responsive neurostimulation (RNS) is approved for DRE in the US and involves stimulation directly to 1 or 2 seizure foci when abnormal electrocorticographic activity is detected by the device's software. After 2 years of RNS, a seizure reduction of 53% was reported in a randomized-double blinded trial, as well as a rate of serious device-related events of 2.5%.

Transcutaneous vagus nerve stimulation (tVNS) is approved for DRE in some European countries and involves externally stimulating the auricular branch of the vagus nerve in the ear. tVNS failed to demonstrate efficacy in a first randomized-double blinded trial: responder rates did not differ between active and control groups, potentially indicating a placebo effect behind the 34% seizure reduction seen in the patients who completed the full follow-up period.
