= Agonal =

Agonal and agonist may refer to:

- Death rattle, deriving from the word agony
- Agonal heart rhythm, abnormal heart rhythm
- Agonal respiration, abnormal breathing pattern
- Agonist, the opposite of antagonist

== See also ==
- Agonic line
