= HSTS =

HSTS may refer to:

- HTTP Strict Transport Security, a web security policy mechanism
- Homosexual transsexual, a controversial term for trans women who are attracted to cis men or trans men who are attracted to women, part of Blanchard's transsexualism typology
- Hs and Ts, a mnemonic used for cardiac arrests
