= Chase McEachern =

Canadian activist

- Born: March 13, 1994
- Died: February 15, 2006 (aged 11)

Chase McEachern was a boy from Barrie, Ontario, Canada, who campaigned to have it mandatory that heart defibrillators be made available at schools and hockey arenas.

== Death ==
On Feb. 9th, 2006, McEachern collapsed at school of cardiac arrest due to an atrial flutter, before his vision could be implemented, and on February 15, 2006, during Heart Month, he died surrounded by his family in a London, Ontario hospital. After his death, the Heart and Stroke Foundation of Canada, working with Chase's parents, created the Chase McEachern Tribute Fund. As a result, there are now automated external defibrillators in schools and other locations throughout Canada.

Shortly before his death, Chase wrote to sports legend Don Cherry asking for help in highlighting the need for this lifesaving equipment. Soon after his death Don Cherry dedicated time to Chase's plight on Coach's Corner.

== The Chase McEachern Act ==
In 2006, the Ontario government introduced the Chase McEachern Act (Heart Defibrillator Civil Liability Act, 2006). This Act protects people from liability if they assisted someone, using a defibrillator, at an emergency (under certain conditions) or (again under certain conditions) if they made defibrillators available in good faith. Rocco Rossi of the Heart and Stroke Foundation of Ontario said of this measure, "Today's action is a fitting tribute to Chase's vision, which will aid in our campaign with the family to introduce 1,000 defibrillators across the province and serve as a catalyst to make these devices as common as fire extinguishers, giving Ontarians the best possible chance of surviving cardiac arrest." The legislation has been passed.

== Legacy ==
Through the Chase McEachern Tribute Fund, Chase's vision has resulted in defibrillators being made available in Ontario government buildings.

A hockey tournament has been named after him. Chase' father, John McEachern, has received a medal for the defibrillator campaign, although he says it should really be his son Chase who should get the medal.
