= Intravenous sodium bicarbonate =

Pharmaceutical drug

Clinical data
- Trade names: many
- Other names: sodium hydrogen carbonate, monosodium carbonate
- AHFS/Drugs.com: Monograph
- MedlinePlus: a682001
- License data: US DailyMed: Sodium_bicarbonate
- Routes of administration: intravenous
- ATC code: B05XA02 (WHO) B05CB04 (WHO)

Legal status
- Legal status: US: ℞-only

Pharmacokinetic data
- Bioavailability: 100% (intravenous)

Identifiers
- IUPAC name: sodium hydrogen carbonate
- CAS Number: 144-55-8
- PubChem CID: 516892
- DrugBank: DB01390
- ChemSpider: 8609
- UNII: 8MDF5V39QO
- KEGG: D01203; C12603
- ChEBI: CHEBI:32139
- ChEMBL: ChEMBL1353

Chemical and physical data
- Formula: CHNaO_{3}
- Molar mass: 84.006 g·mol^{−1}
- 3D model (JSmol): Interactive image
- SMILES: C(=O)(O)[O-].[Na+]
- InChI: InChI=1S/CH2O3.Na/c2-1(3)4;/h(H2,2,3,4);/q;+1/p-1; Key:UIIMBOGNXHQVGW-UHFFFAOYSA-M

Intravenous sodium bicarbonate, also known as sodium hydrogen carbonate, is a medication primarily used to treat severe metabolic acidosis. For this purpose it is generally only used when the pH is less than 7.1 and when the underlying cause is either diarrhea, vomiting, or the kidneys. Other uses include high blood potassium, tricyclic antidepressant overdose, and cocaine toxicity as well as a number of other poisonings. It is given by injection into a vein.

Side effects may include low blood potassium, high blood sodium, and swelling. It is not recommended for people with a low blood calcium level. Sodium bicarbonate is in the alkalinizing family of medications. It works by increasing blood bicarbonate, which buffers excess hydrogen ion and raises blood pH.

Commercial production of sodium bicarbonate began between 1791 and 1823. Intravenous medical use began around the 1950s. It is on the World Health Organization's List of Essential Medicines. Sodium bicarbonate is available as a generic medication.

== Medical uses ==
Intravenous sodium bicarbonate is indicated in the treatment of metabolic acidosis, such as can occur in severe kidney disease, diabetic ketoacidosis, circulatory insufficiency, extracorporeal circulation of blood, in hemolysis requiring alkalinization of the urine to avoid nephrotoxicity of blood pigments, and certain drug intoxications, such as by barbiturate overdose, salicylate poisoning, tricyclic antidepressant overdose or methanol poisoning. In addition, sodium bicarbonate is indicated in severe diarrhea, where large amounts of bicarbonate may be lost. However, overall treatment should also strive to treat the underlying cause of the acidosis, such as giving insulin in case of diabetic ketoacidosis.

=== Dhaka fluid ===
Dhaka fluid
Concentration in millimoles per litre
- Sodium Chloride: 85 mM
- Potassium Chloride: 13 mM
- Sodium bicarbonate: 48 mM
- Solvent: 1 Litre of water or 5 percent glucose solution.

Dhaka fluid is one of the IV fluids used in intravenous rehydration therapy which has sodium bicarbonate content in it. Used as a resuscitative fluid in burn management.

== Contraindications ==
Intravenous sodium bicarbonate is contraindicated in patients who are losing chloride, such as by vomiting.

Because of its sodium content, intravenous sodium bicarbonate should be used with great care, if at all, in patients with congestive heart failure and severe chronic kidney disease, where low sodium intake is strongly indicated to prevent sodium retention. By similar rationale, intravenous sodium bicarbonate should be given with caution to patients receiving corticosteroids.

== Side effects ==
Extravasation of intravenous sodium bicarbonate has been reported to cause chemical cellulitis because of its alkalinity, resulting in tissue necrosis, ulceration and/or sloughing at the site of infiltration. This condition is managed by prompt elevation of the part, warmth and local injection of lidocaine or hyaluronidase.

== Interactions ==
Norepinephrine and dobutamine cannot be used as additives in an intravenous sodium bicarbonate solution.

Intravenous sodium bicarbonate should not be mixed with calcium, as they may precipitate, except where compatibility has been previously established for the preparations at hand.

== Overdosing ==
Overdose of intravenous sodium bicarbonate results in solute and/or fluid overload, potentially leading to edema, including pulmonary edema. Also, it can cause metabolic alkalosis (with signs including muscular twitchings, irritability and tetany). Hypernatremia is also possible. Repeated fractional doses and frequent monitoring by laboratory tests are recommended to minimize the possibility of overdosing.

Rapid administration (equal to or exceeding 10 mL/min) of intravenous sodium bicarbonate into neonates and children under two years of age may produce hypernatremia, resulting in a decrease in cerebrospinal fluid pressure and, possibly, intracranial hemorrhage. Therefore, the rate of administration to such patients should not exceed 8 mEq/kg/day, unless a very strong indication is present.

== Composition ==
It is administered as a hypertonic solution of sodium bicarbonate, most commonly in concentrations of 4.2%, 5.0%, 7.5% or 8.4%.

The solutions generally contain no antimicrobial agent or other added buffer.

== Mechanism of action ==
After injection, intravenous sodium bicarbonate dissociates to provide sodium (Na^{+}) and bicarbonate (HCO_{3}^{−}) anions. Bicarbonate anions can consume hydrogen ions (H^{+}) and thereby be converted to carbonic acid (H_{2}CO_{3}), which can subsequently be converted to water (H_{2}O) and carbon dioxide (CO_{2}) which can be excreted by the lungs.

== Society and culture ==
The Italian physician Tullio Simoncini has claimed that intravenous sodium bicarbonate is an effective cancer therapy. This is rejected by mainstream medicine. Simoncini has been imprisoned twice for culpable manslaughter of people affected by cancer.
