= Sodium bicarbonate =

Chemical compound

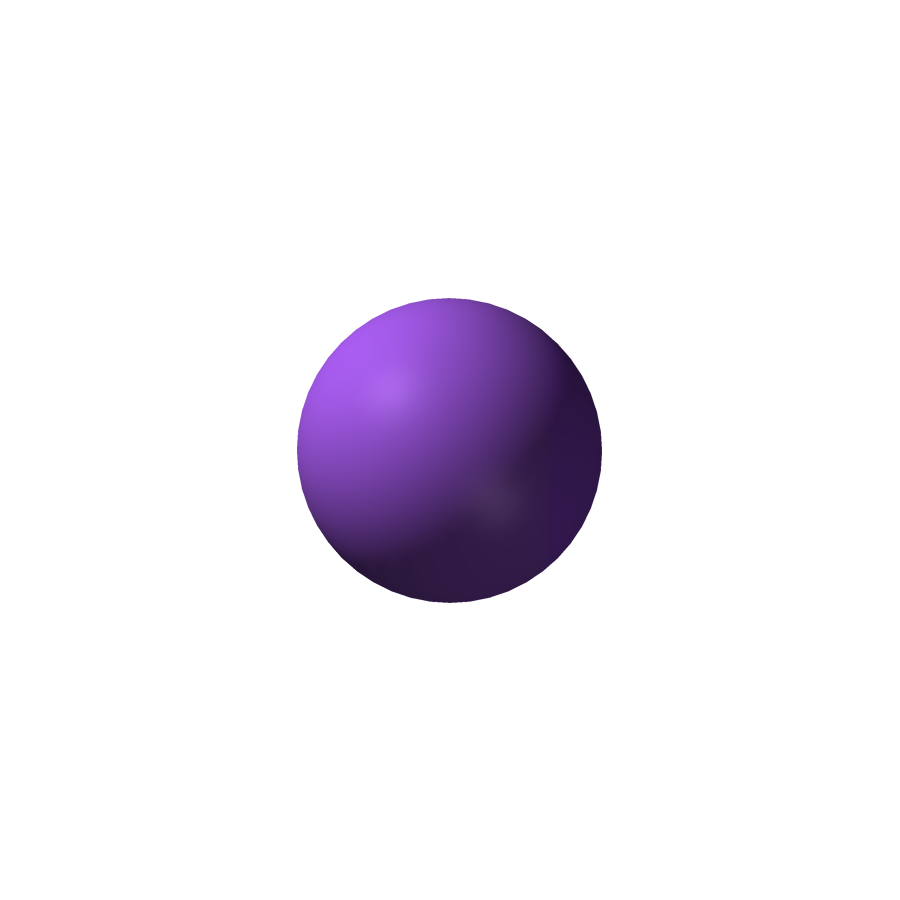
Ball and stick model of a sodium cation
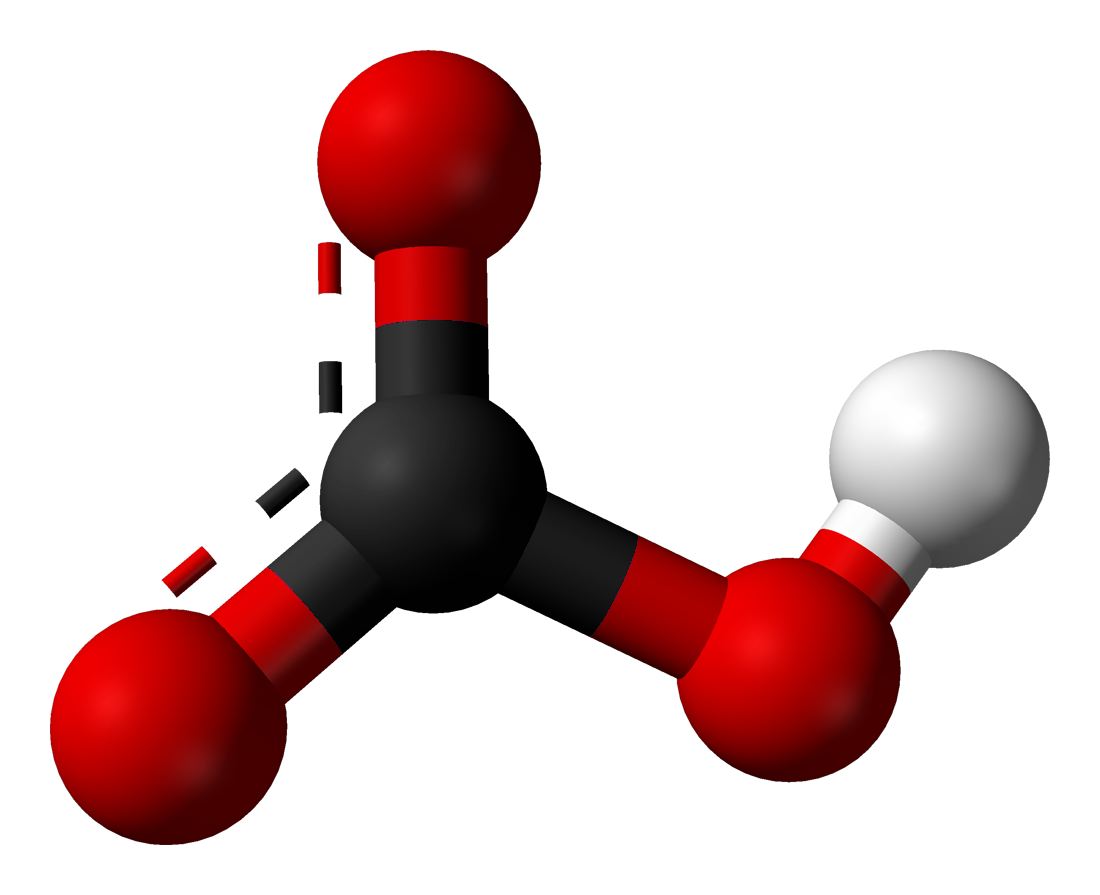
Ball and stick model of a bicarbonate anion
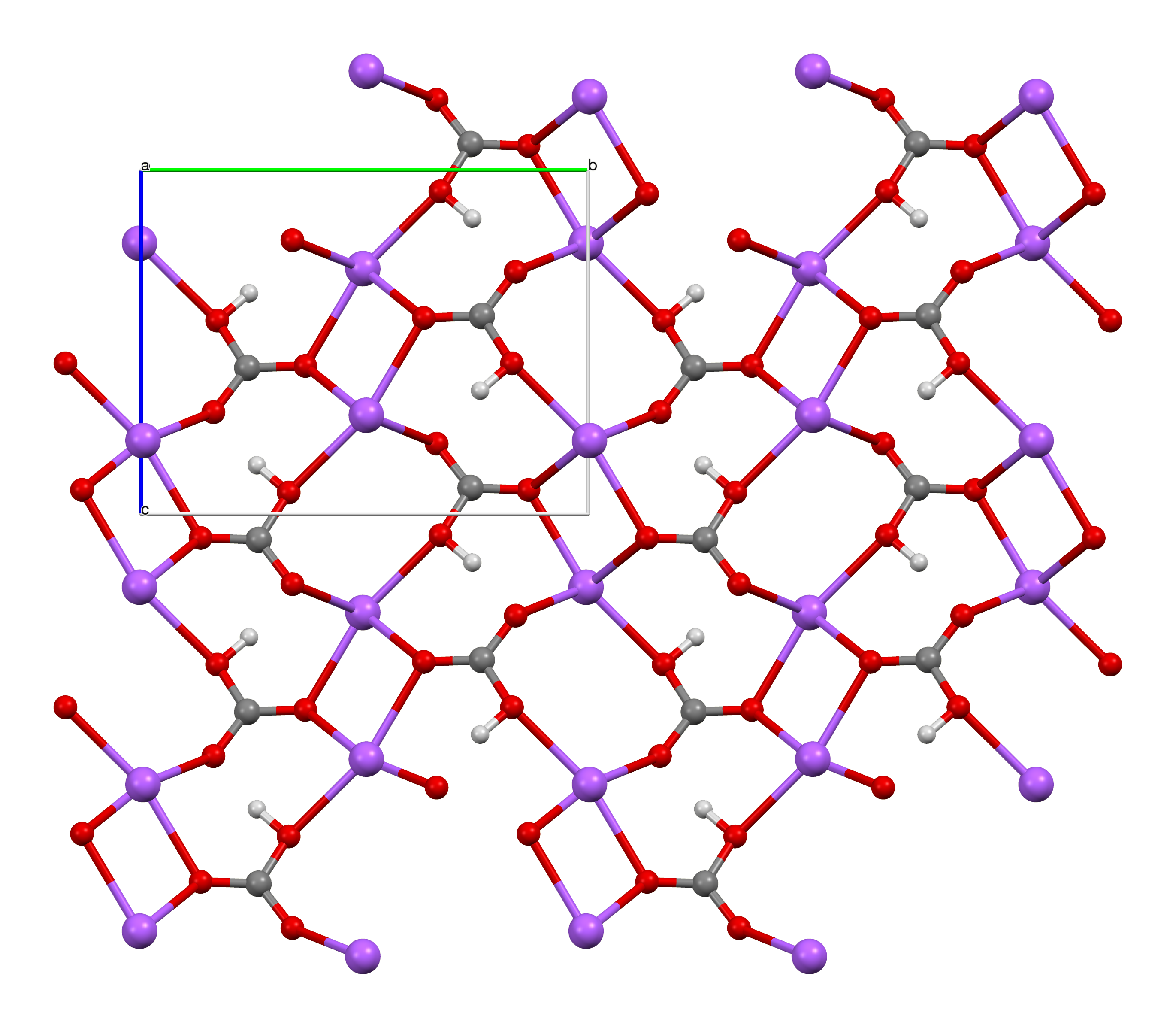
- Crystal structure

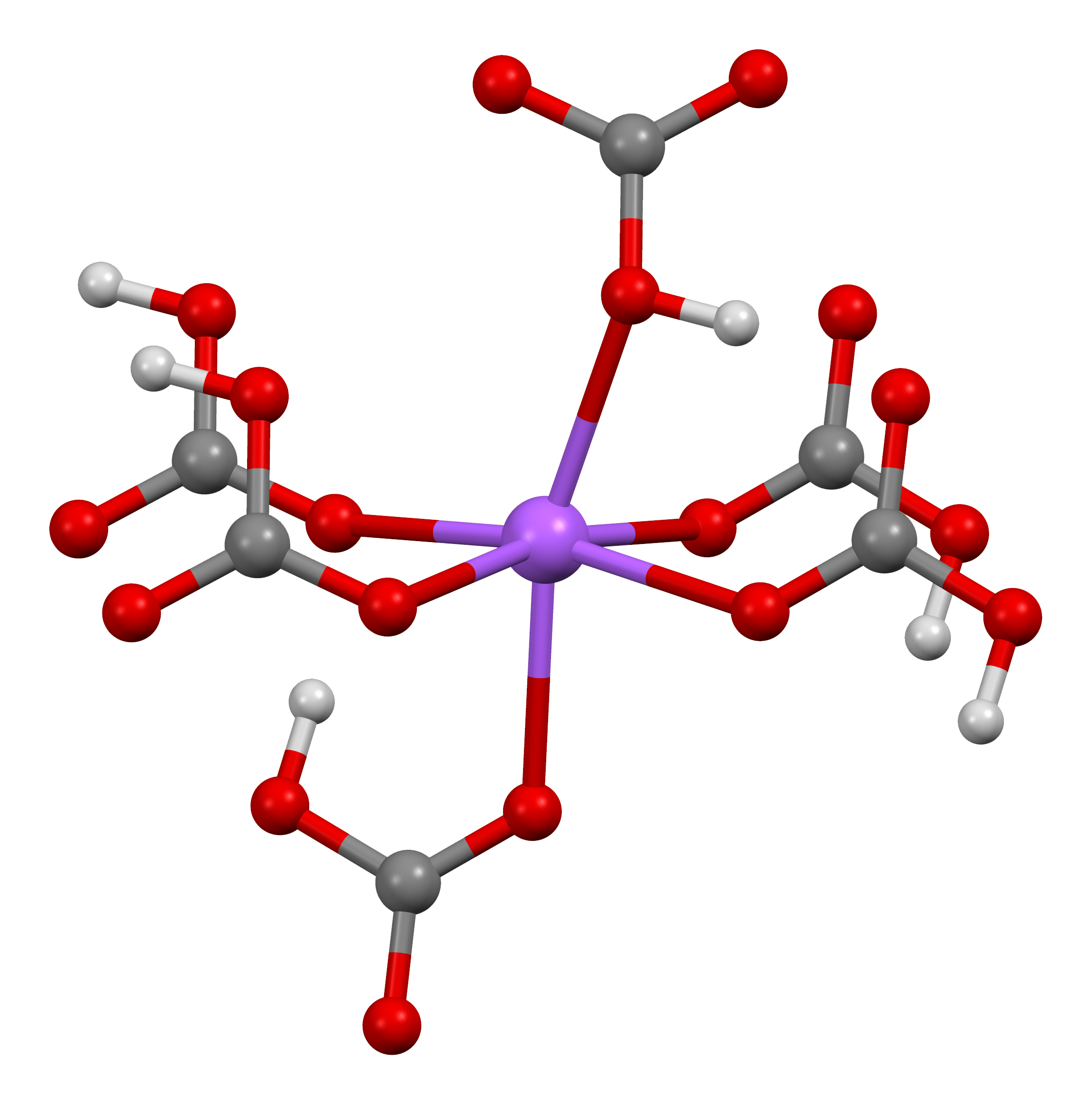
Na^{+} coordination
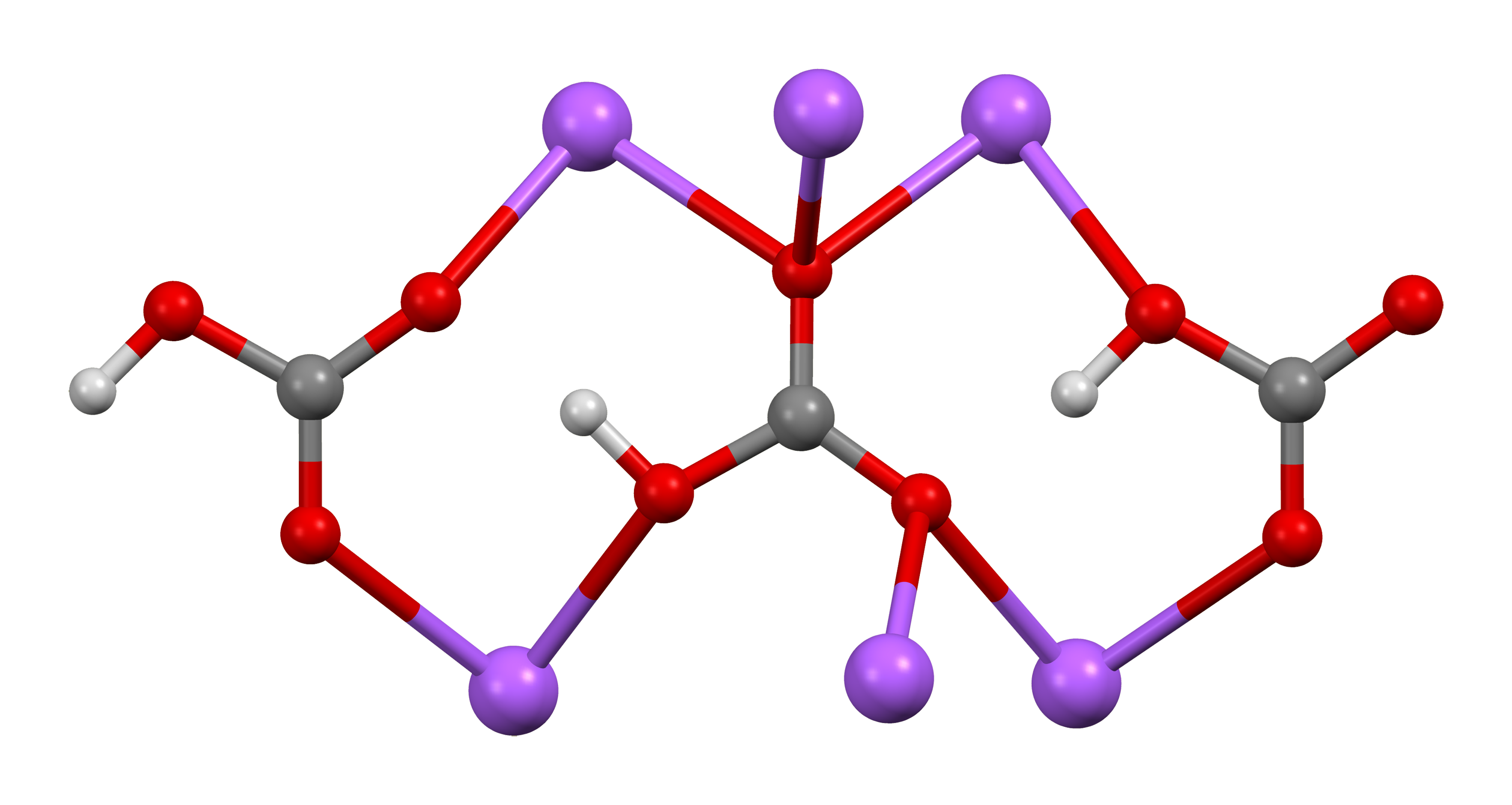
HCO_{3}^{−} coordination

Names
- IUPAC name sodium hydrogen carbonate
- Other names Baking soda, bicarb (colloquial), bicarbonate of soda, nahcolite, natrium hydrogen carbonate, natron

Identifiers
CAS Number	144-55-8
3D model (JSmol)	Interactive image
Beilstein Reference	4153970
ChEBI	CHEBI:32139
ChEMBL	ChEMBL1353
ChemSpider	8609
DrugBank	DB01390
ECHA InfoCard	100.005.122
EC Number	205-633-8
E number	E500(ii) (acidity regulators, ...)
IUPHAR/BPS	4507
KEGG	C12603
MeSH	Sodium+bicarbonate
PubChem CID	516892
RTECS number	VZ0950000
UNII	8MDF5V39QO
CompTox Dashboard (EPA)	DTXSID9021269
- InChI: InChI=1S/CH2O3.Na/c2-1(3)4;/h(H2,2,3,4);/q;+1/p-1 Key: UIIMBOGNXHQVGW-UHFFFAOYSA-M; InChI=1/CH2O3.Na/c2-1(3)4;/h(H2,2,3,4);/q;+1/p-1 Key: UIIMBOGNXHQVGW-REWHXWOFAQ
- SMILES: [Na+].OC([O-])=O

Properties
Chemical formula	NaHCO_{3}
Molar mass	84.006 g·mol^{−1}
Appearance	White crystals
Odor	Odorless
Density	2.20 g/cm^{3}
Melting point	(Decomposes to sodium carbonate starting at 50 °C)
Solubility in water	69 g/L (0 °C); 96 g/L (20 °C); 165 g/L (60 °C)
Solubility	0.02 wt% acetone, 2.13 wt% methanol @22 °C., insoluble in ethanol
log P	−0.82
Acidity (pK_{a})	6.34; 6.351 (carbonic acid)
Refractive index (n_{D})	nα = 1.377 nβ = 1.501 nγ = 1.583

Structure
Crystal structure	Monoclinic

Thermochemistry
Heat capacity (C)	87.6 J/mol K
Std molar entropy (S^{⦵}_{298})	101.7 J/mol K
Std enthalpy of formation (Δ_{f}H^{⦵}_{298})	−950.8 kJ/mol
Gibbs free energy (Δ_{f}G^{⦵})	−851.0 kJ/mol

Pharmacology
ATC code	B05CB04 (WHO) B05XA02 (WHO), QG04BQ01 (WHO)
Routes of administration	Intravenous, oral

Hazards
- Occupational safety and health (OHS/OSH)
Main hazards	Causes serious eye irritation
NFPA 704 (fire diamond)	2 0 1
Flash point	Incombustible
- Lethal dose or concentration (LD, LC)
LD_{50} (median dose)	4220 mg/kg (rat, oral)
Safety data sheet (SDS)	External MSDS

Related compounds
Other anions	Sodium carbonate
Other cations	Ammonium bicarbonate; Potassium bicarbonate
Related compounds	Sodium bisulfate; Sodium hydrogen phosphate
- Except where otherwise noted, data are given for materials in their standard state (at 25 °C [77 °F], 100 kPa). verify (what is ?) Infobox references

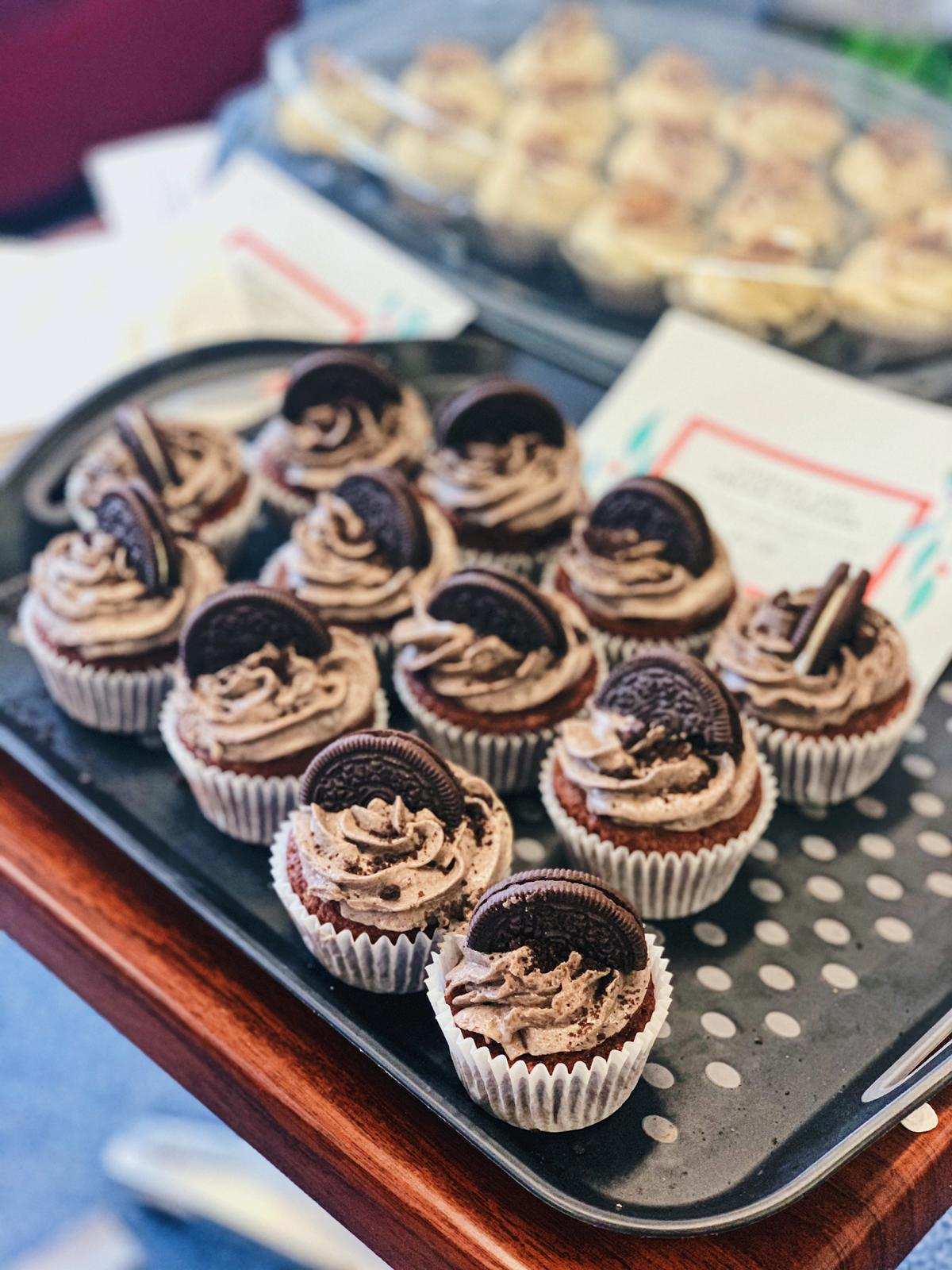
Cupcakes baked with baking soda as a raising agent

Sodium bicarbonate (IUPAC name: sodium hydrogen carbonate), commonly known as baking soda or bicarbonate of soda, or saleratus, is a chemical compound with the chemical formula NaHCO_{3}. It is a salt composed of a sodium cation (Na^{+}) and a bicarbonate anion (HCO_{3}^{−}).

Sodium bicarbonate is a white solid that is crystalline but often appears as a fine powder. It has a slightly salty, alkaline taste resembling that of sodium carbonate ("washing soda"). The natural mineral form is nahcolite, although it is more commonly found as a component of the mineral trona.

Sodium bicarbonate has many different names, including as baking soda, bread soda, cooking soda, brewing soda, and bicarbonate of soda. It can often be found near baking powder in grocery aisles.

The term baking soda is most common in the United States, while bicarbonate of soda is more common in Australia, the United Kingdom, and New Zealand.

The term "bicarbonate" comes from an outdated naming system predating molecular knowledge during the empirical study of factitious airs. The name was coined by William Hyde Wollaston based on the observation that twice as much carbon dioxide can be released per molecule of sodium bicarbonate (NaHCO_{3}) compared to sodium carbonate (Na_{2}CO_{3}) upon heating. Carbon dioxide was initially known as fixed air in the old nomenclature since CO_{2} was thought to be affixed to the molecular structure of certain solid compounds; by the same logic, when CO_{2} was later named carbonic acid by Lavoisier (unrelated to H_{2}CO_{3}), the common nomenclature became carbonate of soda (carbonate was defined by Lavoisier as a salt of CO_{2} / carbonic acid with a base) which was followed by Wollaston coining bicarbonate for two parts CO_{2} per base. The modern chemical formulas of these compounds now express their precise chemical compositions which were unknown when the name bi-carbonate of potash was coined (see factitious airs for further information).

== Uses ==
=== Cooking ===
In cooking, baking soda is primarily used in baking as a leavening agent. When it reacts with acid or is heated, carbon dioxide is released, which causes expansion of the batter and forms the characteristic texture and grain in cakes, quick breads, soda bread, and other baked and fried foods. When an acid is used, the acid–base reaction can be generically represented as follows:

NaHCO_{3} + H^{+} → Na^{+} + CO_{2} + H_{2}O

Acidic materials that induce this reaction include hydrogen phosphates, cream of tartar, citric acid, lactic acid and vinegar.

Heat can also by itself cause sodium bicarbonate to act as a raising agent in baking because of thermal decomposition, releasing carbon dioxide at temperatures above 80 °C (180 °F), as follows:

2 NaHCO_{3} → Na_{2}CO_{3} + H_{2}O + CO_{2}

When used this way on its own, without the presence of an acidic component (whether in the batter or by the use of a baking powder containing acid), only half the available CO_{2} is released (one CO_{2} molecule is formed for every two equivalents of NaHCO_{3}). Additionally, in the absence of acid, thermal decomposition of sodium bicarbonate also produces sodium carbonate, which is strongly alkaline and gives the baked product a bitter, soapy taste and a yellow color.

==== Baking powder ====
Baking powder, also sold for cooking, contains around 30% of bicarbonate, and various acidic ingredients that are activated by the addition of water, without the need for additional acids in the cooking medium. Many forms of baking powder contain sodium bicarbonate combined with calcium acid phosphate, sodium aluminium phosphate, or cream of tartar. Baking soda is alkaline; the acid used in baking powder avoids a metallic taste when the chemical change during baking creates sodium carbonate.

It is also used primarily in Chinese cuisine as a means to make the meat more tender. This is seen in the traditional Cantonese dish of Chinese Beef with Gai lan.

=== Food additive ===
Sodium bicarbonate is often used in conjunction with other bottled water food additives to add taste. Its European Union E number is E500.

=== Pyrotechnics ===
Sodium bicarbonate is one of the main components of the common "black snake" firework. The effect is caused by the thermal decomposition, which produces carbon dioxide gas to produce a long snake-like ash as a combustion product of the other main component, sucrose. Sodium bicarbonate delays combustion through the release of flame retardants carbon dioxide and water when heated.

=== Mild disinfectant ===
Sodium bicarbonate has weak disinfectant properties and it may be an effective fungicide against some organisms.

=== Fire extinguisher ===
Sodium bicarbonate can be used to extinguish small grease or electrical fires by being thrown over the fire, as heating of sodium bicarbonate releases carbon dioxide. However, it should not be applied to fires in deep fryers; the sudden release of gas may cause the grease to splatter. Sodium bicarbonate is used in BC dry chemical fire extinguishers as an alternative to the more corrosive monoammonium phosphate in ABC extinguishers. The alkaline nature of sodium bicarbonate makes it the only dry chemical agent, besides Purple-K, that was used in large-scale fire suppression systems installed in commercial kitchens.

Sodium bicarbonate has several fire-extinguishing mechanisms that act simultaneously. It decomposes into water and carbon dioxide when heated, an endothermic reaction that deprives the fire of heat. In addition, it forms intermediates that can scavenge the free radicals which are responsible for the propagation of fire. With grease fires specifically, it also has a mild saponification effect, producing a soapy foam that can help smother the fire.

=== Neutralization of acids ===
Sodium bicarbonate reacts spontaneously with acids, releasing CO_{2} gas as a reaction product. It is commonly used to neutralize unwanted acid solutions or acid spills in chemical laboratories. It is not appropriate to use sodium bicarbonate to neutralize base even though it is amphoteric, reacting with both acids and bases.

=== Sports supplement ===
Sodium bicarbonate is taken as a sports supplement to improve muscular endurance. Studies conducted mostly in males have shown that sodium bicarbonate is most effective in enhancing performance in short-term, high-intensity activities.

=== Agriculture ===
Sodium bicarbonate can prevent the growth of fungi when applied on leaves, although it will not kill the fungus. Excessive amounts of sodium bicarbonate can cause discolouration of fruits (two percent solution) and chlorosis (one percent solution). Sodium bicarbonate is also commonly used as a free choice dietary supplement in sheep to help prevent bloat.

=== Medical uses and health ===
Sodium bicarbonate mixed with water can be used as an antacid to treat acid indigestion and heartburn. Its reaction with stomach acid produces salt, water, and carbon dioxide:

NaHCO_{3} + HCl → NaCl + H_{2}O + CO_{2}(g)

A mixture of sodium bicarbonate and polyethylene glycol dissolved in water and taken orally, is an effective gastrointestinal lavage preparation and laxative prior to gastrointestinal surgery, gastroscopy, etc.

Intravenous sodium bicarbonate in an aqueous solution is sometimes used for cases of acidosis, or when insufficient sodium or bicarbonate ions are in the blood. In cases of respiratory acidosis, the infused bicarbonate ion drives the carbonic acid/bicarbonate buffer of plasma to the left, and thus raises the pH. For this reason, sodium bicarbonate is used in medically supervised cardiopulmonary resuscitation. Infusion of bicarbonate is indicated only when the blood pH is markedly low (< 7.1–7.0).

HCO_{3}^{−} is used for treatment of hyperkalemia, as it will drive K^{+} back into cells during periods of acidosis. Since sodium bicarbonate can cause alkalosis, it is sometimes used to treat aspirin overdoses. Aspirin requires an acidic environment for proper absorption, and a basic environment will diminish aspirin absorption in cases of overdose. Sodium bicarbonate has also been used in the treatment of tricyclic antidepressant overdose. It can also be applied topically as a paste, with three parts baking soda to one part water, to relieve some kinds of insect bites and stings (as well as accompanying swelling).

Some alternative practitioners, such as Tullio Simoncini, have promoted baking soda as a cancer cure, which the American Cancer Society has warned against due to both its unproven effectiveness and potential danger in use. Edzard Ernst has called the promotion of sodium bicarbonate as a cancer cure "one of the more sickening alternative cancer scams I have seen for a long time".

Sodium bicarbonate can be added to local anaesthetics, to speed up the onset of their effects and make their injection less painful. It is also a component of Moffett's solution, used in nasal surgery.

It has been proposed that acidic diets weaken bones. One systematic meta-analysis of the research shows no such effect. Another also finds that there is no evidence that alkaline diets improve bone health, but suggests that there "may be some value" to alkaline diets for other reasons.

Antacid (such as baking soda) solutions have been prepared and used by protesters to alleviate the effects of exposure to tear gas during protests.

Similarly to its use in baking, sodium bicarbonate is used together with a mild acid such as tartaric acid as the excipient in effervescent tablets: when such a tablet is dropped in a glass of water, the carbonate leaves the reaction medium as carbon dioxide gas (HCO_{3}^{−} + H^{+} → H_{2}O + CO_{2}↑ or, more precisely, HCO_{3}^{−} + H_{3}O^{+} → 2 H_{2}O + CO_{2}↑). This makes the tablet disintegrate, leaving the medication suspended and/or dissolved in the water together with the resulting salt (in this example, sodium tartrate).

==== Personal hygiene ====
Sodium bicarbonate is also used as an ingredient in some mouthwashes. It has anticaries and abrasive properties. It works as a mechanical cleanser on the teeth and gums, neutralizes the production of acid in the mouth, and also acts as an antiseptic to help prevent infections. Sodium bicarbonate in combination with other ingredients can be used to make a dry or wet deodorant. Sodium bicarbonate may be used as a buffering agent, combined with table salt, when creating a solution for nasal irrigation.

It is used in eye hygiene to treat blepharitis. This is done by adding a teaspoon of sodium bicarbonate to cool water that was recently boiled followed by gentle scrubbing of the eyelash base with a cotton swab dipped in the solution.

==== Veterinary uses ====
Sodium bicarbonate is used as a cattle feed supplement, in particular as a buffering agent for the rumen.

=== Cleaning agent ===
Sodium bicarbonate is used in a process to remove paint and corrosion called sodablasting. As a blasting medium, sodium bicarbonate is used to remove surface contamination from softer and less resilient substrates such as aluminium, copper, or timber that could be damaged by silica sand abrasive media.

A manufacturer recommends a paste made from baking soda with minimal water as a gentle scouring powder. Such a paste can be useful in removing surface rust because the rust forms a water-soluble compound when in a concentrated alkaline solution. Cold water should be used since hot-water solutions can corrode steel. Sodium bicarbonate attacks the thin protective oxide layer that forms on aluminium, making it unsuitable for cleaning this metal.

A solution of baking soda in warm water will remove the tarnish from silver when the silver is in contact with a piece of aluminium foil.

During the Manhattan Project to develop the nuclear bomb in the early 1940s, the chemical toxicity of uranium was an issue. Uranium oxides were found to stick very well to cotton cloth and did not wash out with soap or laundry detergent. However, the uranium would wash out with a 2% solution of sodium bicarbonate.

=== Odor control ===
It is often claimed that baking soda is an effective odor remover and recommended that an open box be kept in the refrigerator to absorb odor. This idea was promoted by the leading U.S. brand of baking soda, Arm & Hammer, in an advertising campaign starting in 1972. Though this campaign is considered a classic of marketing, leading within a year to more than half of American refrigerators containing a box of baking soda, there is little evidence that it is effective in this application. However, baking soda may be effective in absorbing musty smells in books.

=== Education ===
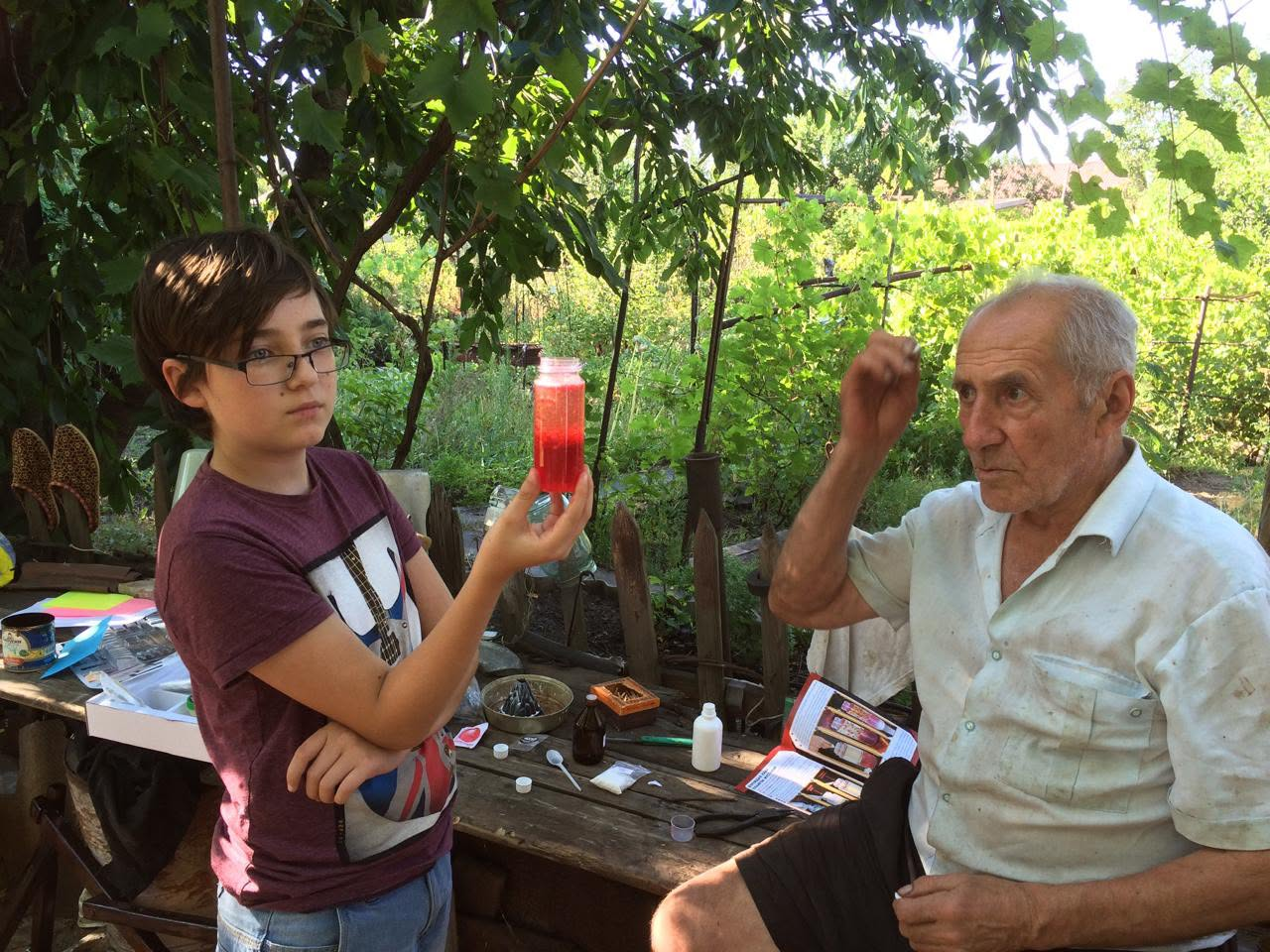
A boy and his grandfather preparing a Baking Soda and Vinegar Volcano.

An educational science experiment known as the "Baking Soda and Vinegar Volcano" uses the acid-base reaction with vinegar acid to mimic a volcanic eruption. The rapid production of CO_{2} causes the liquid to foam up and overflow its container. Other ingredients such as dish soap and food coloring can be added to enhance the visual effect. If this reaction is performed inside of a closed vessel (such as a bottle) with no way for gas to escape, it can cause an explosion if the pressure is high enough.

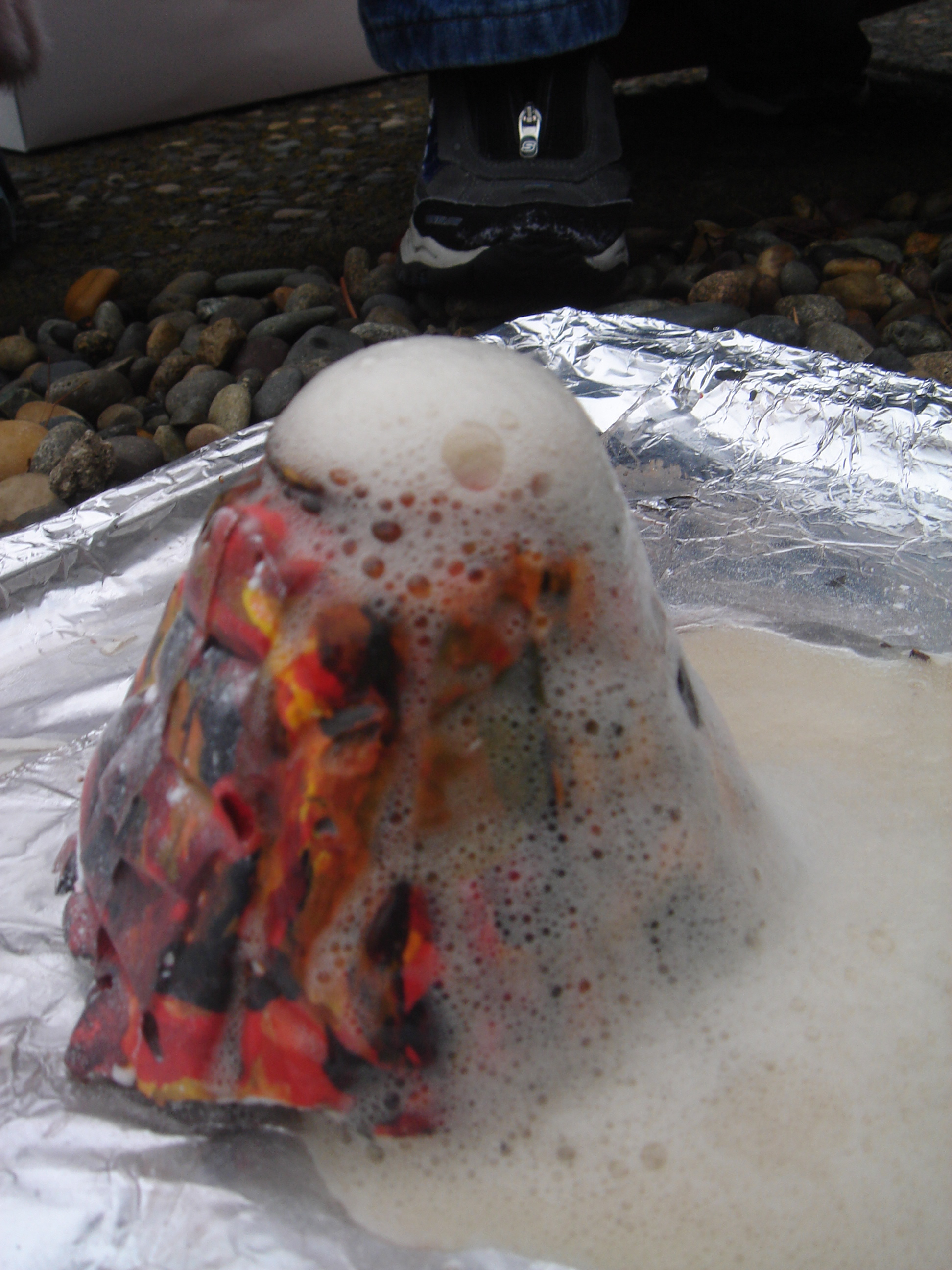
End result of a Baking Soda and Vinegar Volcano.

== Chemistry ==
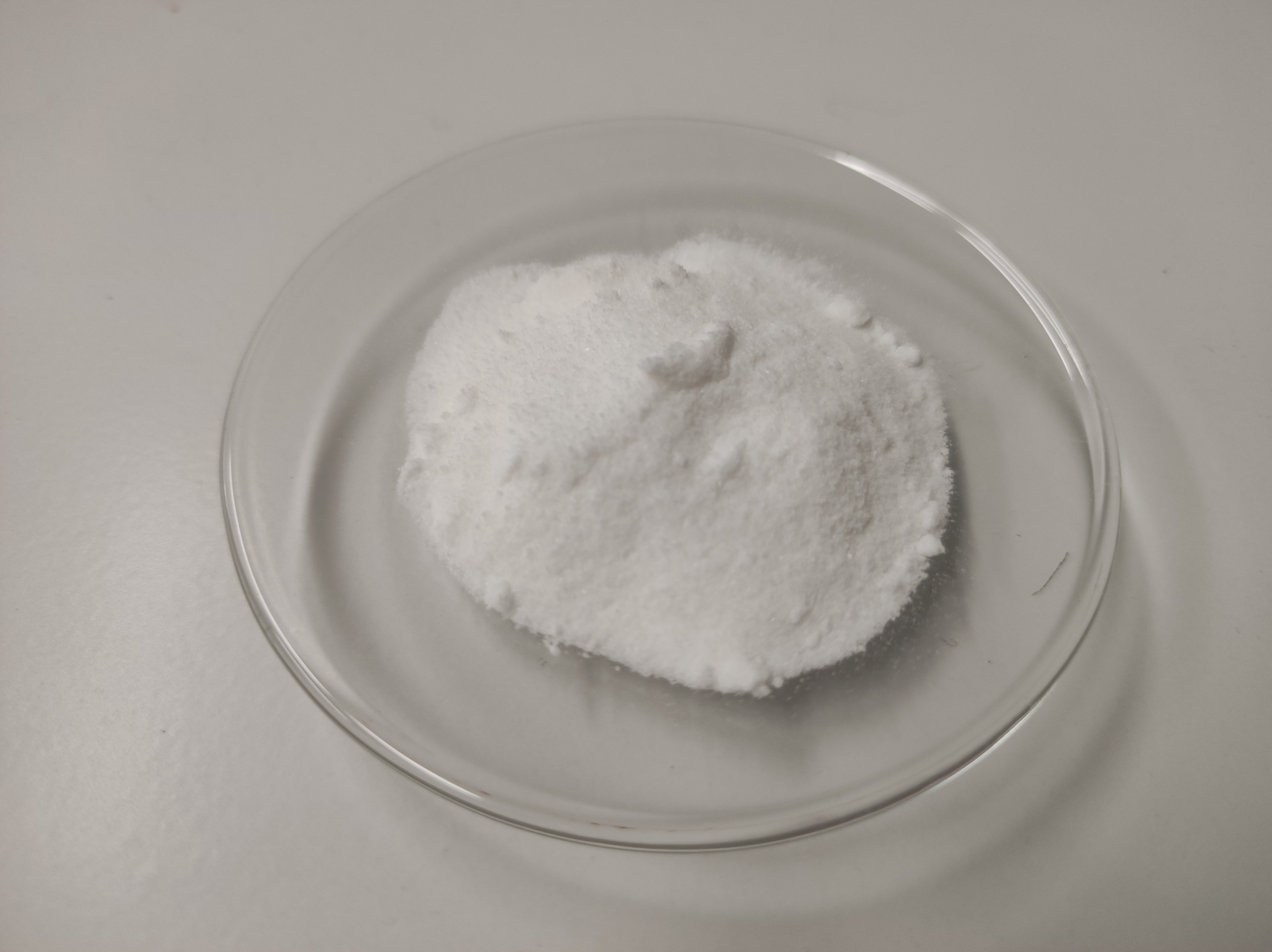
Sodium bicarbonate

Sodium bicarbonate is an amphoteric compound. Aqueous solutions are mildly alkaline due to the formation of carbonic acid and hydroxide ion:

HCO_{3}^{−} + H_{2}O → H_{2}CO_{3} + OH^{−}

Sodium bicarbonate can sometimes be used as a mild neutralization agent and a safer alternative to strong bases like sodium hydroxide. Reaction of sodium bicarbonate and an acid produces a salt and carbonic acid, which readily decomposes to carbon dioxide and water:

NaHCO_{3} + HCl → NaCl + H_{2}O + CO_{2}
H_{2}CO_{3} → H_{2}O + CO_{2}(g)

Sodium bicarbonate reacts with acetic acid (found in vinegar), producing sodium acetate, water, and carbon dioxide:

NaHCO_{3} + CH_{3}COOH → CH_{3}COONa + H_{2}O + CO_{2}(g)

Sodium bicarbonate reacts with bases such as sodium hydroxide to form carbonates:

NaHCO_{3} + NaOH → Na_{2}CO_{3} + H_{2}O

=== Thermal decomposition ===
At temperatures from 80–100 °C (176–212 °F), sodium bicarbonate gradually decomposes into sodium carbonate, water, and carbon dioxide. The conversion is faster at 200 °C (392 °F):

2 NaHCO_{3} → Na_{2}CO_{3} + H_{2}O + CO_{2}

Most bicarbonates undergo this dehydration reaction. Further heating converts the carbonate into the oxide (above 850 °C/1,560 °F):

Na_{2}CO_{3} → Na_{2}O + CO_{2}

The generation of carbon dioxide and water partially explain the fire-extinguishing properties of NaHCO_{3}, although other factors like heat absorption and radical scavenging are more significant.

== Natural occurrence ==
In nature, sodium bicarbonate occurs almost exclusively as either nahcolite or trona. Trona is more common, as nahcolite is more soluble in water and the chemical equilibrium between the two minerals favors trona. Significant nahcolite deposits are in the United States, Botswana and Kenya, Uganda, Turkey, and Mexico. The biggest trona deposits are in the Green River basin in Wyoming.

Nahcolite is sometimes found as a component of oil shale.

== Stability and shelf life ==
If kept cool (room temperature) and dry (an airtight container is recommended to keep out moist air), sodium bicarbonate can be kept without significant decomposition for at least two or three years.

== History ==
The word natron has been in use in many languages throughout modern times (in the forms of anatron, natrum and natron) and originated (like Spanish, French and English natron as well as 'sodium') via Arabic naṭrūn (or anatrūn; cf. the Lower Egyptian Wadi El Natrun, where a mixture of sodium carbonate and sodium hydrogen carbonate for the dehydration of mummies was used) from Greek nítron (νίτρον) (Herodotus; Attic lítron (λίτρον)), which can be traced back to ancient Egyptian ntr. The Greek nítron (soda, saltpeter) was also used in Latin (sal) nitrum and in German Salniter (the source of Nitrogen, Nitrat etc.). The word saleratus, from Latin sal æratus (meaning "aerated salt"), was widely used in the 19th century for both sodium bicarbonate and potassium bicarbonate.

In 1791, French chemist Nicolas Leblanc produced sodium carbonate (also known as soda ash). Pharmacist Valentin Rose the Younger is credited with the discovery of sodium bicarbonate in 1801 in Berlin. In 1846, two American bakers, John Dwight and Austin Church, established the first factory in the United States to produce baking soda from sodium carbonate and carbon dioxide.

Saleratus, potassium or sodium bicarbonate, is mentioned in the novel Captains Courageous by Rudyard Kipling as being used extensively in the 1800s in commercial fishing to prevent freshly caught fish from spoiling.

In 1919, US Senator Lee Overman declared that bicarbonate of soda could cure the Spanish flu. In the midst of the debate on 26 January 1919, he interrupted the discussion to announce the discovery of a cure. "I want to say, for the benefit of those who are making this investigation," he reported, "that I was told by a judge of a superior court in the mountain country of North Carolina they have discovered a remedy for this disease." The purported cure implied a critique of modern science and an appreciation for the simple wisdom of simple people. "They say that common baking soda will cure the disease," he continued, "that they have cured it with it, that they have no deaths up there at all; they use common baking soda, which cures the disease."

== Production ==
Sodium bicarbonate is produced industrially from sodium carbonate:

Na_{2}CO_{3} + CO_{2} + H_{2}O → 2 NaHCO_{3}

It is produced on the scale of about 100,000 tonnes/year (as of 2001) with a worldwide production capacity of 2.4 million tonnes per year (as of 2002). Commercial quantities of baking soda are also produced by a similar method: soda ash, mined in the form of the ore trona, is dissolved in water and treated with carbon dioxide. Sodium bicarbonate precipitates as a solid from this solution.

=== Mining ===
Nahcolite is also produced by solution mining, pumping heated water through nahcolite beds and crystallizing the dissolved nahcolite through a cooling crystallization process.

Since nahcolite is sometimes found in shale, it can be produced as a co-product of shale oil extraction, where it is recovered by solution mining.

== In popular culture ==
Sodium bicarbonate, as "bicarbonate of soda", was a frequent source of punch lines for Groucho Marx in Marx Brothers movies. In Duck Soup, Marx plays the leader of a nation at war. In one scene, he receives a message from the battlefield that his general is reporting a gas attack, and Groucho tells his aide: "Tell him to take a teaspoonful of bicarbonate of soda and a half a glass of water." In A Night at the Opera, Groucho's character addresses the opening night crowd at an opera by saying of the lead tenor: "Signor Lassparri comes from a very famous family. His mother was a well-known bass singer. His father was the first man to stuff spaghetti with bicarbonate of soda, thus causing and curing indigestion at the same time."

In the Joseph L. Mankewicz classic All About Eve, the Max Fabian character (Gregory Ratoff) has an extended scene with Margo Channing (Bette Davis) in which, suffering from heartburn, he requests and then drinks bicarbonate of soda, eliciting a prominent burp. Channing promises to always keep a box of bicarb with Max's name on it.

== See also ==
- Carbonic acid
- List of ineffective cancer treatments
- List of minerals
- Natron
- Potassium bicarbonate
- Trona

== Bibliography ==
- Haynes WM, ed. (2011). CRC Handbook of Chemistry and Physics (92nd ed.). CRC Press. ISBN 978-1439855119.
