= Automated external defibrillator =

Portable electronic medical device

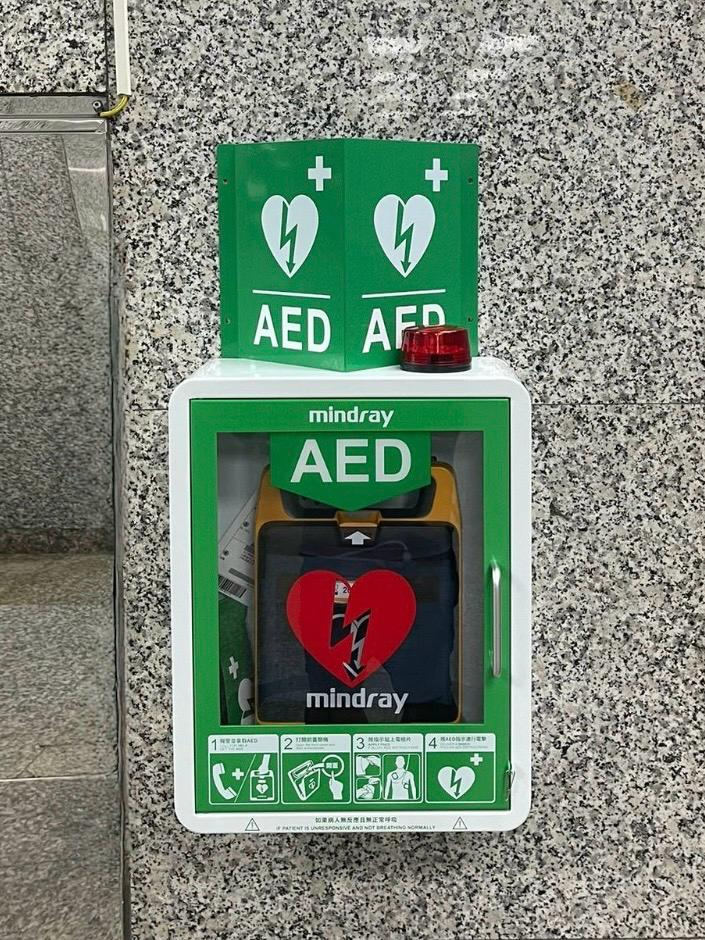
- AED machine
- Acronym: AED
- Synonyms: defibrillator, defib
- Specialty: Cardiology, emergency medicine
- Inventor(s): Frank Pantridge
- Related items: Manual defibrillator
- [edit on Wikidata]

An automated external defibrillator (AED) is a portable electronic device that automatically diagnoses the life-threatening cardiac arrhythmias of ventricular fibrillation (VF) and pulseless ventricular tachycardia, and is able to treat them through defibrillation, the application of electricity which stops the arrhythmia, allowing the heart to re-establish an effective rhythm.

With simple audio and visual commands, AEDs are designed to be simple to use for the layperson, and the use of AEDs is taught in many first aid, certified first responder, and basic life support (BLS) level cardiopulmonary resuscitation (CPR) classes.

The portable version of the defibrillator was invented in the mid-1960s by Frank Pantridge in Belfast, Northern Ireland and the first automatic, public-use defibrillator was produced by the Cardiac Resuscitation Company in the late 1970s. The unit was launched under the name Heart-Aid.

== Indications ==
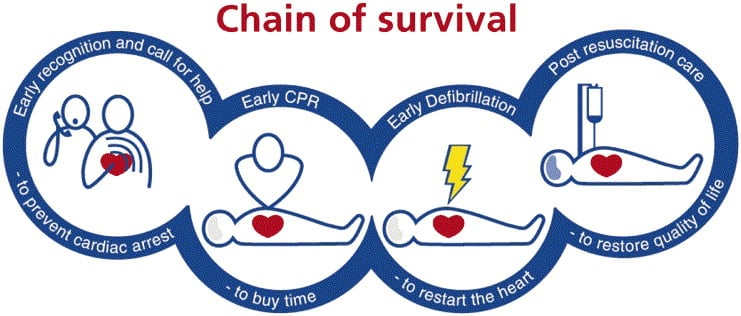
A diagram showing the chain of survival

=== Conditions that the device treats ===
An automated external defibrillator is used in cases of life-threatening cardiac arrhythmias which lead to sudden cardiac arrest, which is not the same as a heart attack. The rhythms that the device will treat are usually limited to:

1. Pulseless Ventricular tachycardia (shortened to VT or V-Tach)
2. Ventricular fibrillation (shortened to VF or V-Fib)

In each of these two types of shockable cardiac arrhythmia, the heart is electrically active, but in a dysfunctional pattern that does not allow it to pump and circulate blood. In ventricular tachycardia, the heart beats too fast to effectively pump blood. Ultimately, ventricular tachycardia leads to ventricular fibrillation. In ventricular fibrillation, the electrical activity of the heart becomes chaotic, preventing the ventricle from effectively pumping blood. The fibrillation in the heart decreases over time, and will eventually reach asystole.

AEDs, like all defibrillators, are not designed to shock asystole ('flat line' patterns) as this will not have a positive clinical outcome. The asystolic patient only has a chance of survival if, through a combination of CPR and cardiac stimulant drugs, one of the shockable rhythms can be established, which makes it imperative for CPR to be carried out prior to the arrival of a defibrillator.

=== Effect of delayed treatment ===
Uncorrected, these cardiac conditions (ventricular tachycardia, ventricular fibrillation, asystole) rapidly lead to irreversible brain damage and death, once cardiac arrest takes place. After approximately three to five minutes in cardiac arrest, irreversible brain/tissue damage may begin to occur. For every minute that a person in cardiac arrest goes without being successfully treated (by defibrillation), the chance of survival decreases by 7 percent per minute in the first three minutes, and decreases by 10 percent per minute as time advances beyond ~three minutes.

=== Requirements for use ===
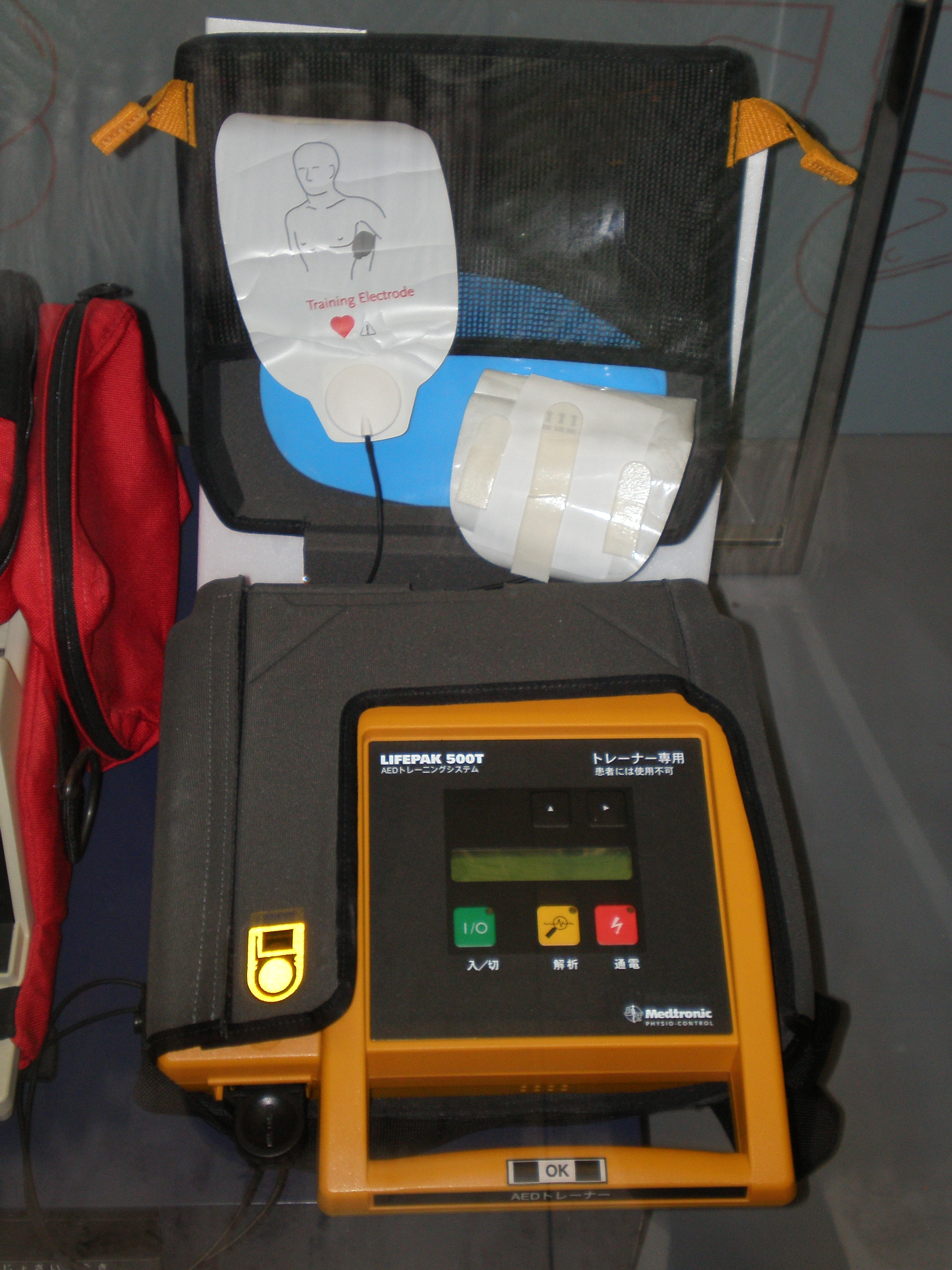
Defibrillator training kit

AEDs are designed to be used by laypersons who may not have received AED training. However, sixth-grade students have been reported to begin defibrillation within 90 seconds, as opposed to a trained operator beginning within 67 seconds. This is in contrast to more sophisticated manual and semi-automatic defibrillators used by health professionals, which can act as a pacemaker if the heart rate is too slow (bradycardia) and perform other functions which require a skilled operator able to read electrocardiograms.

Bras with a metal underwire and piercings on the torso must be removed before using the AED on someone to avoid interference. The American television show MythBusters found evidence that use of a defibrillator on a woman wearing an underwire bra can lead to arcing or fire but only in unusual and unlikely circumstances.

In a study analyzing the effects of having AEDs immediately present during Chicago's Heart Start program over a two-year period, of 22 individuals, 18 were in a cardiac arrhythmia which AEDs can treat. Of these 18, 11 survived. Of these 11 patients, 6 were treated by bystanders with absolutely no previous training in AED use.

== Implementation ==
=== Placement and availability ===
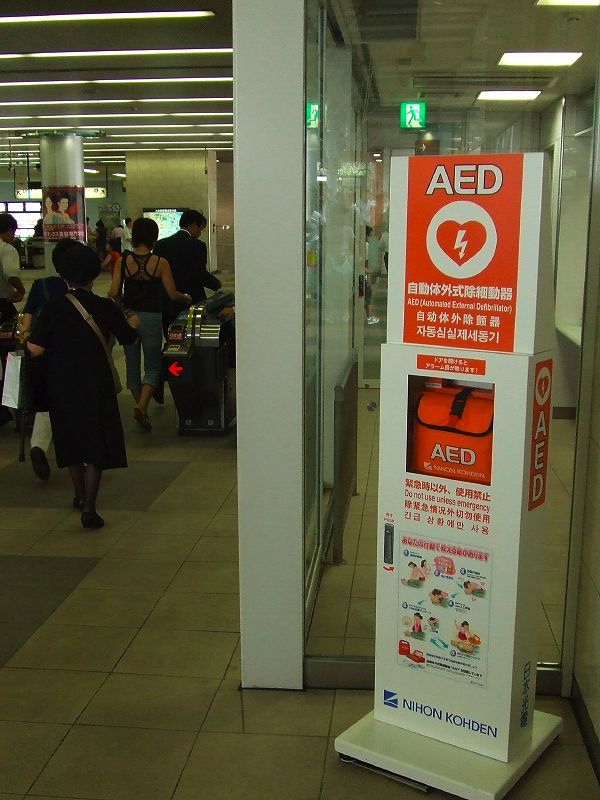
An AED at a railway station in Japan

Automated external defibrillators are generally either kept where health professionals and first responders can use them (health facilities and ambulances) as well as public access units which can be found in public places including corporate and government offices, shopping centres, restaurants, hotels, public transport, and any other location where people may congregate.

The universal AED sign, developed by the International Liaison Committee on Resuscitation and adopted as ISO 7010 E010

In order to make them highly visible, public access AEDs are often brightly coloured and are mounted in protective cases near the entrance of a building. When these protective cases are opened or the defibrillator is removed, some will sound a buzzer to alert nearby staff to their removal, though this does not necessarily summon emergency services; trained AED operators should know to phone for an ambulance when sending for or using an AED. In September 2008, the International Liaison Committee on Resuscitation issued a 'universal AED sign' to be adopted throughout the world to indicate the presence of an AED, and this is shown on the right.

A trend that is developing is the purchase of AEDs to be used in the home, particularly by those with known existing heart conditions. The number of devices in the community has grown as prices have fallen to affordable levels. There has been some concern among medical professionals that these home users do not necessarily have appropriate training, and many advocate the more widespread use of community responders, who can be appropriately trained and managed.

Typically, an AED kit will contain a face shield for providing a barrier between patient and first aider during rescue breathing; a pair of nitrile rubber gloves; a pair of trauma shears for cutting through a patient's clothing to expose the chest; a small towel for wiping away any moisture on the chest, and a razor for shaving those with very hairy chests.

=== Preparation for operation ===
Most manufacturers recommend checking the AED before every period of duty or on a regular basis for fixed units. Some units need to be switched on in order to perform a self check; other models have a self check system built in with a visible indicator.

All manufacturers mark their electrode pads with an expiration date, and it is important to ensure that the pads are in date. The typical life expectancy of AED pads are between 18 and 30 months. This is usually marked on the outside of the pads. Some models are designed to make this date visible through a 'window', although others will require the opening of the case to find the date stamp.

It is also important to ensure that the AED unit's batteries have not expired. The AED manufacturer will specify how often the batteries should be replaced. Each AED has a different recommended maintenance schedule outlined in the user manual. Common checkpoints on every checklist, however, also include a monthly check of the battery power by checking the green indicator light when powered on, condition and cleanliness of all cables and the unit, and check for the adequate supplies.

=== Mechanism of operation ===
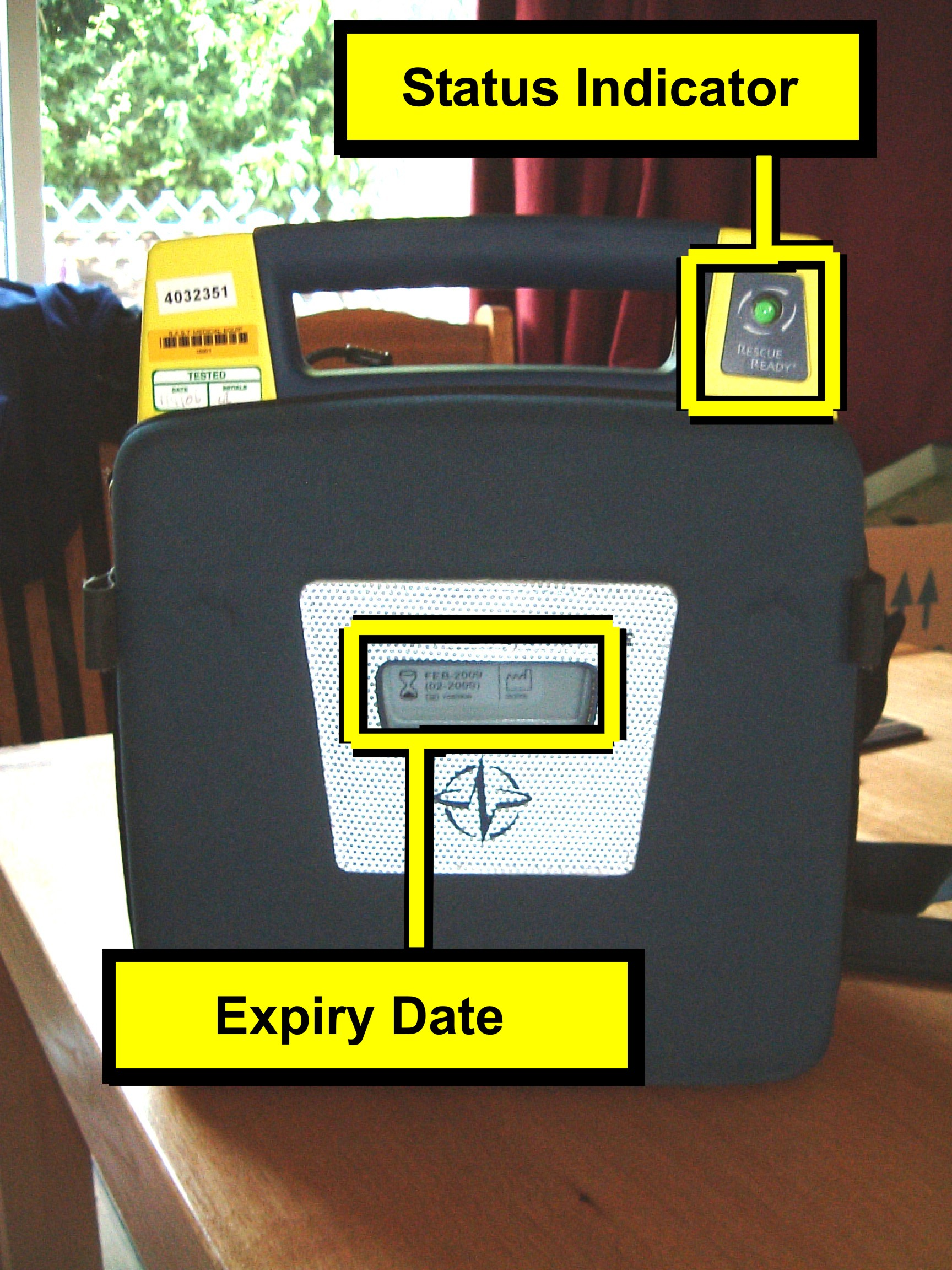
The use of easily visible status indicator and pad expiration date on a Cardiac Science G3 AED

An AED is "automatic" because of the unit's ability to autonomously analyse the patient's condition. To assist this, the vast majority of units have spoken prompts, and some may also have visual displays to instruct the user.

"External" refers to the fact that the operator applies the electrode pads to the bare chest of the victim (as opposed to internal defibrillators, which have electrodes surgically implanted inside the body of a patient).

When turned on or opened, the AED will instruct the user to connect the electrodes (pads) to the patient. Once the pads are attached, everyone should avoid touching the patient so as to avoid false readings by the unit. The pads allow the AED to examine the electrical output from the heart and determine if the patient is in a shockable rhythm (either ventricular fibrillation or ventricular tachycardia). If the device determines that a shock is warranted, it will use the battery to charge its internal capacitor in preparation to deliver the shock. The device system is not only safer - charging only when required, but also allows for a faster delivery of the electric current.

When charged, the device instructs the user to ensure no one is touching the patient and then to press a button to deliver the shock; human intervention is usually required to deliver the shock to the patient in order to avoid the possibility of accidental injury to another person (which can result from a responder or bystander touching the patient at the time of the shock). Depending on the manufacturer and particular model, after the shock is delivered most devices will analyze the patient and either instruct CPR to be performed, or prepare to administer another shock.

Many AED units have an 'event memory' which store the ECG of the patient along with details of the time the unit was activated and the number and strength of any shocks delivered. Some units also have voice recording abilities to monitor the actions taken by the personnel in order to ascertain if these had any impact on the survival outcome. All this recorded data can be either downloaded to a computer or printed out so that the providing organisation or responsible body is able to see the effectiveness of both CPR and defibrillation. Some AED units even provide feedback on the quality of the compressions provided by the rescuer.

The first commercially available AEDs were all of a monophasic type, which gave a high-energy shock, up to 360 to 400 joules depending on the model. This caused increased cardiac injury and in some cases second and third-degree burns around the shock pad sites. Newer AEDs (manufactured after late 2003) have tended to utilise biphasic algorithms which give two sequential lower-energy shocks of 120–200 joules, with each shock moving in an opposite polarity between the pads. Others may give a stepped approach to energy delivery, usually in a 200J, a second 200J, then 300J, and finally 360J shock, with any further shocks also being 360 Joules. This lower-energy waveform has proven more effective in clinical tests, as well as offering a reduced rate of complications and reduced recovery time.

== Usage ==
=== Simplicity of use ===
Usual placement of pads on chest

Unlike regular defibrillators, an automated external defibrillator (AED) requires minimal training to be used (or even no training). That is possible because all AEDs approved for use in the United States and many other countries use an electronic voice to prompt users through each step. Many AEDs now include visual prompts in case of a hearing impaired user. Most units are designed for use by non-medical operators. Their ease of use has given rise to the notion of public access defibrillation (PAD).

An AED automatically diagnoses the heart rhythm and determines if a shock is needed. Automatic models will administer the shock without the user's command. Semi-automatic models will tell the user that a shock is needed, but the user must tell the machine to do so, usually by pressing a button. In most circumstances, the user cannot override a "no shock" advisory by an AED. Some AEDs may be used on children – those under 55 lbs (25 kg) in weight or under age 8. If a particular model of AED is approved for pediatric use, all that is required is the use of more appropriate pads.

=== Benefit ===
Observational studies have shown that in out-of-hospital cardiac arrest, public access defibrillators when used were associated with 40% median survival. When operated by non-dispatched lay first responders they have the highest likelihood of leading to survival.

=== Liability ===
==== United States ====
Automated external defibrillators are now easy enough to use that most states in the United States include the "good faith" use of an AED by any person under Good Samaritan laws. "Good faith" protection under a Good Samaritan law means that a volunteer responder (not acting as a part of one's occupation) cannot be held civilly liable for the harm or death of a victim by providing improper or inadequate care, given that the harm or death was not intentional and the responder was acting within the limits of their training and in good faith. In the United States, Good Samaritan laws provide some protection for the use of AEDs by trained and untrained responders. AEDs create little liability if used correctly; NREMT-B and many state Emergency Medical Technician (EMT) training and many CPR classes incorporate or offer AED education as a part of their program.

==== Canada ====
In addition to Good Samaritan laws, Ontario, Canada also has the "Chase McEachern Act (Heart Defibrillator Civil Liability), 2007 (Bill 171 – Subsection N)", passed in June, 2007, which protects individuals from liability for damages that may occur from their use of an AED to save someone's life at the immediate scene of an emergency unless damages are caused by gross negligence.

==== Australia ====
Legislation in Australia varies by state, with separate liability issues relating to providing and using AED equipment. Each state and territory has enacted "Good Samaritan" laws that offer legal protection to a person who gives assistance in a medical emergency - the standard of care expected corresponds to their training (or lack of training). In New South Wales, the Work Health and Safety Regulation (2011) requires an employer to use a risk assessment to ensure that there is adequate provision for first aid; when there is a sufficient risk it warrants providing a defibrillator.

=== Reliability ===
In 2012, AED's (automated external defibrillators) were under scrutiny by the U.S. Food and Drug Administration (FDA) which considered reclassifying AEDs as class III premarket approval devices. Technical malfunctions likely contributed to more than 750 deaths in the 5-year period between 2004 and 2009, in most cases by component failures or design errors. During the same period, up to 70 types of AEDs were recalled, including recalls from every AED manufacturer in the world.

In January and February 2015, the FDA issued this news release: "The FDA issued a final order that will require AED manufacturers to submit premarket approval applications (PMAs), which undergo a more rigorous review than what was required to market these devices in the past. The agency's strengthened review will focus on the critical requirements needed to ensure the safety and reliability of AEDs and their necessary accessories, including batteries, pad electrodes, adapters and hardware keys for pediatric use."

In the United Kingdom there is concern that poor maintenance may make public defibrillators unreliable. Regular inspections and readiness checks are essential to maintaining AED effectiveness over time. The Henley Standard reported on 21 July 2017 that more than half the defibrillators in Henley-on-Thames and the surrounding area were at risk of failing, either because of low battery power or because adhesive pads had deteriorated.

== History ==
The first use of an external defibrillator on a human was in 1947 by Claude Beck. The portable version of the external defibrillator was invented in 1957 by Frank Pantridge in Belfast, Northern Ireland, a pioneer in emergency medical treatment. Pantridge's defibrillator required a trained operator to perform the shock procedure and charted a course for many new innovations in external defibrillation.

In the late 1970s the Heart-Aid was developed as the first truly automated external defibrillator that was designed for the public. The principles of ABC assessment and a human voice relaying instructions helped bystanders respond to a sudden cardiac event while waiting for the first responders to get to scene. Many of the early innovations in the Heart-Aid model are still part of the current generation of AEDs, although some innovations, like the airway electrode have fallen from use.

== See also ==
- Cardiopulmonary resuscitation
- Defibrillation
- Advanced cardiac life support
- Cardioversion
