= Agonal heart rhythm =

Variant of asystole

In medicine, an agonal heart rhythm is a variant of asystole. Agonal heart rhythm is usually ventricular in origin and is often <20bpm. Occasional P waves and QRS complexes can be seen on the electrocardiogram. The complexes tend to be wide and bizarre in morphological appearance. Clinically, an agonal rhythm is regarded as asystole and should be treated equivalently, with cardiopulmonary resuscitation and administration of intravenous adrenaline. An agonal rhythm is the heart's last efforts to (ineffectively) pump before progressing to asystole. The name is derived from the Greek word Agon meaning struggle.

== See also ==
- Asystole
- Cardiac arrest
- Myocardial infarction
- Ventricular fibrillation
