= Ictal asystole =

Rare occurrence for patients with temporal lobe epilepsy

Ictal asystole (IA) is a rare occurrence for patients that have temporal lobe epilepsy. It can often be identified by loss of muscle tone or the presence of bilateral asymmetric jerky limb movements and the lack of heart activity during a seizure, although ECG monitoring is necessary to provide a firm result. Ictal asystole and ictal bradycardia can cause an epileptic patient to die suddenly.

== Signs and symptoms ==
Ictal asystole is a rare condition and is more common to show up than other heart issues like ictal atrioventricular block and IB. Ictal asystole can cause higher risks of sudden falls, severe injuries and being unresponsive. Most cases have stated that the temporal lobe or insular epilepsy in the brain can affect the heart and this causes the heart to slow down or stop completely.

== Causes ==
The causes of ictal asystole are associated with temporal and frontal lobe seizures. During a seizure, the brain activity can react in a way that affects the heart rate to slow down or stop for several seconds. Having ictal asystole long-term can cause cerebral anoxic ischemia. The cause of ictal asystole comes from the temporal lobe epilepsy. In the early stages of epilepsy, men are more likely to get ictal asystole earlier. The delay between epilepsy onset and ictal asystole onset is longer for women as to getting ictal asystole later on after they experience epilepsy. This means they are more likely to have ictal asystole later while they still have epilepsy.

== Diagnosis ==
According to the University of Pécs and Bethesda Children's Hospital, electroencephalogram (EEG) and electrocardiogram (ECG) are needed to be implemented at the same time and the heart to stop for at least 4 or more seconds to be measured. Video electroencephalography monitoring (VEM) and ECG are monitors used to help detect rare heart conditions. Ictal asystole shows up mostly on the left side of the brain. It is connected with temporal lobe seizures and is drug resistant, but it can still happen with seizures that spread to both sides of their brains. This is to confirmed the patient has ictal asystole.

== Treatment ==
Treatments usually starts off with antiepileptic drug (AED) medication to treat ictal asystole such as levetiracetam, carbamazepine, lamotrigine, and valproate that are commonly used. However treating patients with ictal asystole isn't the same for everyone, it varies from person to person. 70% of the patients were not able to recover with AED therapy and only 1/3 were able to become seizure free. It also depends how long they had asystole. Ictal asystole can be resolved with treatment with cardiac pacemaker implantation if there is cardiac dysfunction. Unless patients who couldn't get better with medications alone, a cardiac pacemaker was implanted. Otherwise using cardiac pacemaker implantation should only be used if other measures failed to provide. Epilepsy surgery for anterior temporal lobectomy can also improve successfully becoming seizures and symptom free.
