= Ictal bradycardia =

- Diagnostic method: Heart rate less than 60 bpm during a seizure

Sinus Bradycardia: what an EKG might look like during ictal bradycardia

Ictal bradycardia is a condition in which individuals with epilepsy experience bradycardia before, during, or after a seizure (epileptic discharge). Bradycardia is defined by a heart rate less than 60 beats per minute. (Normal range is 60-100 bpm). Ictal bradycardia most commonly occurs in individuals with focal epilepsy during focal dyscognitive seizures, primarily temporal lobe epilepsy.

Ictal epileptic discharges can effect changes in cardiac rhythm. An increase in heart rhythm is common during seizures. This type of epileptic seizure is known as ictal tachycardia, in which the subject's heart rate increase of more than 10 beats per minute of above the baseline. In comparison, ictal bradycardia causes epileptic discharges that disrupt the normal cardiac rhythm in a negative fashion. Slowing the heart beat down by more than 10 beats per minute below the average baseline.

== Pathophysiology ==
Ictal bradycardia is considered an autonomic manifestation of seizures, and is propagated by the central autonomic network central autonomic network. The central autonomic network is crucial for regulating sympathetic and parasympathetic responses. Areas involved in this network include the amygdala, anterior cingulate cortex, insular cortex, thalamus, hypothalamus, periaqueductal grey matter, parabrachial nucleus, and medullary regions. Seizures can activate these networks, causing autonomic reflex responses, such as ictal bradycardia. Seizures can also cause catecholamine release, also leading to autonomic responses.

== Signs and Symptoms ==
Ictal bradycardia symptoms can vary. They can be mild and asymptomatic, involving only sinus bradycardia. More severe manifestations can include sinus arrest and atrioventricular block. It can also progress to asystole.

== Diagnostic Evaluation and Differential Diagnosis ==
Ictal bradycardia requires a multidisciplinary approach to diagnosis, with neurology and cardiology evaluations. Neurology evaluations may require EEG monitoring paired with EKG monitoring. A cardiac workup may also be required, with EKG and echocardiogram.

Other Differentials:

1. Neurocardiogenic (Vasovagal) Syncope
2. Primary Cardiogenic Arrhythmias (such as sick sinus syndrome or AV block)
3. Carotid Sinus Hypersensitivity
4. Non-epileptic seizures
5. Cardiocerebral channelopathy

== Treatment ==
Treatment for ictal bradycardia can involve targeting either the onset of seizures, or the arrythmias. It has been cited that treating the epilepsy with antiseizure medications or surgical epilepsy will also treat the ictal bradycardia. Otherwise, pacemaker implantation can be used to prevent significant adverse outcomes from ictal bradycardia. There are no standard treatment guidelines.

== Prognosis ==
Ictal bradycardia is a potential cause or reason for ictal asystole to occur and is believed to help explain the phenomenon of sudden unexpected death in epilepsy (SUDEP).Through the simultaneous use of electroencephalograph (EEG) and electrocardiograms (ECG), researchers can monitor and record a patient going through ictal bradycardia seizures. And most importantly provide treatment with both antiepileptic drugs and cardiac pace as deemed necessary for the patient. Although there is limited amount of information about ictal bradycardia, as it is a relatively new discovery and is considered to be rare condition, researchers suggest that early diagnosis and treatment of ictal bradycardia can eliminate the chances of sudden unexpected death in epilepsy.

== History ==
Alterations of heart rate during epilepsy have been cited as early as 1906.
