= Tullio Simoncini =

Italian former physician

Tullio Simoncini (1951 – May 20, 2024) was an Italian physician known for alternative medicine advocacy. He is known for the claim that cancer is caused by the fungus Candida albicans, and has argued that cancer is a form of candida overgrowth. He also is known for claims that cancer can be cured with intravenous sodium bicarbonate. On his website, Simoncini says that he was formerly an oncologist. But that designation has been challenged by the medical community because of his use of sodium bicarbonate in the treatment of cancer.

The mainstream medical community rejects Simoncini's hypothesis, citing a lack of peer-reviewed studies that support it. The American Association for Cancer Research has recently written that research shows an association between fungi, including Candida, and cancer but has not determined causation. The site does not endorse any cures, including treatment with sodium bicarbonate.

Quackwatch lists sodium bicarbonate injections as a "dubious treatment".

Simoncini died on May 20, 2024, from heart illness.

== Criminal convictions ==
Simoncini was tried and found guilty of fraud and manslaughter in 2006 after a patient died after receiving his treatment.

In 2018, Simoncini received a 5-year jail sentence for culpable manslaughter of a cancer patient in 2011.

== Subsequent controversy ==
In 2012, Simoncini became involved in a controversy when he was invited to a conference in Totnes, England, by the Arcturus Clinic. Trading Standards then accused the clinic of violating the Cancer Act 1939 because they had published information that "offer[ed] to treat any person for cancer." Stephen Hopwood, the clinic's manager, described Simoncini's invitation as a "misunderstanding".

== See also ==
- List of ineffective cancer treatments
