= Hs and Ts =

Mnemonic

The Hs and Ts is a mnemonic used to aid in remembering the possible reversible causes of cardiac arrest. A variety of disease can lead to a cardiac arrest; however, they usually boil down to one or more of the "Hs and Ts".

== Hs ==
=== Hypovolemia ===
Hypovolemia is a result of a lack of circulating body fluids, principally blood volume. This is usually (though not exclusively) caused by some form of bleeding, anaphylaxis, or pregnancy with gravid uterus. Peri-arrest treatment includes giving IV fluids and blood transfusions, and controlling the source of any bleeding - by direct pressure for external bleeding, or emergency surgical techniques such as esophageal banding, gastroesophageal balloon tamponade (for treatment of massive gastrointestinal bleeding such as in esophageal varices), resuscitative thoracotomy in cases of penetrating trauma or significant shear forces applied to the chest, or exploratory laparotomy in cases of penetrating trauma, spontaneous rupture of major blood vessels, or rupture of a hollow viscus in the abdomen.

=== Hypoxia ===
Hypoxia is a lack of oxygen delivery to the heart, brain and other vital organs. Rapid assessment of airway patency and respiratory effort must be performed. If the patient is mechanically ventilated, the presence of breath sounds and the proper placement of the endotracheal tube should be verified. Treatment may include providing oxygen, proper ventilation, and good CPR technique. In cases of carbon monoxide poisoning or cyanide poisoning, hyperbaric oxygen may be employed after the patient is stabilized.

=== Acidosis ===
Acidosis (hydrogen cation excess) is an abnormal pH in the body as a result of lactic acidosis which occurs in prolonged hypoxia and in severe infection, diabetic ketoacidosis, kidney failure causing uremia, or ingestion of toxic agents or overdose of pharmacological agents, such as aspirin and other salicylates, ethanol, ethylene glycol and other alcohols, tricyclic antidepressants, isoniazid, or iron sulfate. This can be treated with proper ventilation, good CPR technique, buffers like sodium bicarbonate, and in select cases may require emergent hemodialysis.

=== Hyperkalemia or hypokalemia ===
Hyperkalemia (excess) and hypokalemia (inadequate) potassium can be life-threatening.

A common presentation of hyperkalemia is in the patient with end-stage renal disease who has missed a dialysis appointment and presents with weakness, nausea, and broad QRS complexes on the electrocardiogram. (Note, however, that patients with chronic kidney disease are often more tolerant of high potassium levels as their body often adapts to it.) Several medications, for example the antibiotic trimethoprim/sulfamethoxazole or an ACE inhibitor, can also lead to the development of significant hyperkalemia. The electrocardiogram will show tall, peaked T waves (often larger than the R wave) or can degenerate into a sine wave as the QRS complex widens. Immediate initial therapy is the administration of calcium, either as calcium gluconate or calcium chloride. This stabilizes the electrochemical potential of cardiac myocytes, thereby preventing the development of fatal arrhythmias. This is, however, only a temporizing measure. Other temporizing measures may include nebulized salbutamol, intravenous insulin (usually given in combination with glucose), and sodium bicarbonate which all temporarily drive potassium into the interior of cells. Definitive treatment of hyperkalemia requires actual excretion of potassium, either through urine (which can be facilitated by administration of loop diuretics such as furosemide) or in the stool (which is accomplished by giving sodium polystyrene sulfonate enterally, where it will bind potassium in the GI tract.) Severe cases will require emergent hemodialysis.

The diagnosis of hypokalemia (not enough potassium) can be suspected when there is a history of diarrhoea or malnutrition. Loop diuretics may also contribute. The electrocardiogram may show flattening of T waves and prominent U waves. Hypokalemia is an important cause of acquired long QT syndrome, and may predispose the patient to torsades de pointes. Digitalis use may increase the risk that hypokalemia will produce life-threatening arrhythmias. Hypokalemia is especially dangerous in patients with ischemic heart disease.

=== Hypothermia ===
Hypothermia is a low core body temperature, defined clinically as a temperature of less than 35 degrees Celsius (95 degrees Fahrenheit). The patient is re-warmed either by using a cardiac bypass or by irrigation of the body cavities (such as thorax, peritoneum, bladder) with warm fluids; or warmed IV fluids. CPR only is given until the core body temperature reaches 30 degrees Celsius, as defibrillation is ineffective at lower temperatures. Patients have been known to be successfully resuscitated after periods of hours in hypothermia and cardiac arrest, and this has given rise to the often-quoted medical truism, "You're not dead until you're warm and dead."

=== Hypoglycemia ===
Hypoglycemia was removed from the Hs and Ts by the American Heart Association in their 2010 ACLS update.

The association between hypoglycemia and sudden cardiac death is unclear. Moderate and severe hypoglycemia were both associated with increased mortality; however, giving dextrose is also associated with worse outcomes in one trial.

== Ts ==
=== Tablets or toxins ===
Tablets such as tricyclic antidepressants, phenothiazines, beta blockers, calcium channel blockers, cocaine, digoxin, aspirin, and paracetamol (acetaminophen). This may be evidenced by items found on or around the patient, the patient's medical history (i.e. drug abuse, medication) taken from family and friends, checking the medical records to make sure no interacting drugs were prescribed, or sending blood and urine samples to the toxicology lab for report. Treatment may include specific antidotes, fluids for volume expansion, vasopressors, sodium bicarbonate (for tricyclic antidepressants), glucagon or calcium (for calcium channel blockers), benzodiazepines (for cocaine), or cardiopulmonary bypass. Herbal supplements and over-the-counter medications should also be considered, alongside narcotics.

=== Cardiac tamponade ===
In cardiac tamponade, blood or other fluids building up in the pericardium can put pressure on the heart so that it is not able to beat. This condition can be recognized by the presence of a narrowing pulse pressure, muffled heart sounds, distended neck veins, electrical alternans on the electrocardiogram, or by visualization on echocardiogram. This is treated in an emergency by inserting a needle into the pericardium to drain the fluid (pericardiocentesis), or if the fluid is too thick then a subxiphoid window is performed to cut the pericardium and release the fluid.

=== Tension pneumothorax ===
Tension pneumothorax is the build-up of air into one of the pleural cavities, which causes a mediastinal shift. When this happens, the great vessels (particularly the superior vena cava) become kinked, which limits blood return to the heart. The condition can be recognized by severe air hunger, hypoxia, jugular venous distension, hyperresonance to percussion on the affected side, and a tracheal shift away from the affected side. The tracheal shift often requires a chest x-ray to appreciate (although treatment should be initiated prior to obtaining a chest x-ray if this condition is suspected). This is relieved by a needle thoracostomy (inserting a needle catheter) into the 2nd intercostal space at the mid-clavicular line, which relieves the pressure in the pleural cavity. Critical care teams also have the skill to incise the chest in the 5th intercostal space in the mid-axillary line, to evacuate air with a larger breach of the pleura. However, this is associated with a range of potential complications.

=== Thrombosis (myocardial infarction) ===
In thrombosis (myocardial infarction), if the patient can be successfully resuscitated, there is a chance that the myocardial infarction can be treated, either with thrombolytic therapy or percutaneous coronary intervention.

=== Thromboembolism ===
In thromboembolism (pulmonary embolism), hemodynamically significant pulmonary emboli are generally massive and typically fatal. Administration of thrombolytics can be attempted, and some specialized centers may perform thrombectomy; however, prognosis is generally poor.

=== Trauma ===
Cardiac arrest can also occur after a hard blow to the chest at a precise moment in the cardiac cycle, which is known as commotio cordis. Other traumatic events such as high speed car crashes can cause sufficient structural damage to induce arrest.

== Alternatives ==
An alternative mnemonic for reversible causes of cardiac arrest is ABCD-Ultrasound:

- Airway and access; Ensuring open airways such as using a supraglottic device, establishing access by venipuncture (or intraosseous needle) for intravenous therapy.
- Blood gas and bicarbonate; checking a venous blood gas with electrolytes, as well as giving bicarbonate and calcium in case of hyperkalemia. Bicarbonate may also be given in profound acidosis (but the most important acidosis treatment is adequate ventilation).
- Core temperature; To detect and treat hypothermia.
- Defibrillation; The application of an automated external defibrillator for rhythm analysis and correction.
- Ultrasound: Cardiac ultrasonography for any pericardial effusion that may be causing a cardiac tamponade, as well as any right ventricle dilatation that may indicate a massive pulmonary embolism. Bilateral lung ultrasonography to look for lung sliding and rule out a tension pneumothorax.
