= Jarvis =

Jarvis may refer to:

== People ==
- Jarvis (name), a surname and a given name
- Järvis, an Estonian surname

== Places ==
=== Canada ===
- Jarvis, Ontario, a town
- Jarvis Pass, a mountain pass in the Northern Rockies of British Columbia

=== United States ===
- Jarvis, Missouri, an unincorporated community
- Jarvis, Texas, a ghost town
- Mount Jarvis, Alaska
- Jarvis Creek, Kansas
- Jarvis Island, an uninhabited South Pacific coral island and an unincorporated, unorganized territory of the United States
- Jarvis Park, Maryville, Tennessee

=== Outer space ===
- Jarvis (crater), on the far side of the Moon
- 3353 Jarvis, an asteroid

== Fictional characters ==
- Jarvis, a character in the Tron franchise
- Cookie Jarvis, former cartoon mascot of Cookie Crisp cereal
- Dick Jarvis, protagonist of the short story "A Martian Odyssey"
- Edwin Jarvis, a fictional Marvel Comics butler
  - J.A.R.V.I.S., the AI personality inspired by that character
- Tommy Jarvis, in the Friday the 13th franchise
- Jarvis Lorry, in the novel A Tale of Two Cities
- Jarvis Montgomery, a character portrayed by Rob Newman in the comedy series Newman and Baddiel in Pieces

== Military and Coast Guard ==
- USS Jarvis, three destroyers named after James C. Jarvis
- USCGC Jarvis, a United States Coast Guard cutter
- RCAF Station Jarvis, a Second World War British Commonwealth Air Training Plan station near Jarvis, Ontario, Canada
- Jarvis Hospital, an American Civil War military hospital in Baltimore, Maryland

== Transportation ==
- Jarvis (rocket), a proposed launch vehicle
- Project Jarvis, a Blue Origin project to develop a fully-reusable second stage rocket
- Jarvis station, a rapid transit station in Chicago, Illinois, United States
- Jarvis Street, Toronto, Ontario, Canada

== Other uses ==
- Jarvis Christian University, a private, historically black Christian college in Texas, United States
- Jarvis Collegiate Institute, a high school in Toronto, Ontario, Canada
- The Jarvis, an apartment building in Cambridge, Massachusetts, United States, on the National Register of Historic Places
- Jarvis of Wimbledon (Jarvis & Sons Ltd), London bicycle manufacturers and coachbuilders in the early- to mid-20th century
- Jarvis plc, a United Kingdom public sector contractor
- Jarvis (album), debut solo album by Jarvis Cocker
- Jarvis baronets, an extinct title in the Baronetage of the United Kingdom
- Jarvis v Swans Tours Ltd, a case in English contract law
- Jarvis algorithm, also known as the gift wrapping algorithm

== See also ==
- Jarvis House (disambiguation)
- Jervis (disambiguation)
- Javits (disambiguation)
