= Jarvis (name) =

Jarvis is a given name and English language surname that derives from the personal name Gervase, the element geri meaning "spear". Other spellings of the name include Jervis, Jervoise, and Gervis.

== Surname ==
=== A ===
- Adrian Jarvis, rugby fly-half
- Affie Jarvis (1860–1933), Australian Test cricketer
- Andrew Jarvis, American politician and restaurateur.
- Ann Jarvis (1832–1905), social activist, founder of Mother's Day holiday in the US
- Anna Jarvis (1864–1948), daughter of Ann Jarvis
- Anna Jarvis (physician), Canadian physician
- Arthur Jarvis (1894–1969), Canadian flying ace

=== B ===
- Bryce Jarvis, American baseball player

=== C ===
- Chris Jarvis (actor) (born 1980), British actor best known for his role in The Bill
- Chris Jarvis (presenter) (born 1969), British presenter of children's television programmes
- Chris Jarvis (rower) (born 1980), Canadian Olympic rower
- Cosmo Jarvis, English singer-songwriter, musician, actor and filmmaker

=== D ===
- D. C. Jarvis (1881–1966), American physician from Vermont
- Dan Jarvis, British Labour MP, born 1972 in Nottingham
- Dave Jarvis, American college baseball coach
- David H. Jarvis (1862–1911), captain in the United States Revenue Cutter Service
- Doug Jarvis, ice hockey forward

=== E ===
- Ene Järvis, Estonian actress
- Eric Jarvis (1907–1987), Rhodesian lawyer and judge
- Eugene Jarvis, game designer and programmer

=== F ===
- Francis Jarvis, rugby league footballer
- Frank Jarvis (actor) (1941–2010), British actor
- Frank Jarvis (athlete) (1878–1933), American Olympic sprinter
- Fred Jarvis, British trade union leader

=== G ===
- George Jarvis (disambiguation)
- Graham Jarvis (1930–2003), actor
- Gregory Jarvis (1944–1986), American astronaut killed aboard the Space Shuttle Challenger

=== H ===
- Harwood Jarvis (1884–1936), Australian cricketer
- Howard Jarvis (1903–1986), American businessman, tax-revolt leader in California

=== J ===
- Jack Jarvis (1887–1968), British racehorse trainer
- James Jarvis (disambiguation)
- Jeff Jarvis, American journalist
- Jim Jarvis (baseball), American baseball player
- John Jarvis (disambiguation)
- Joseph Jarvis Stockport County football player

=== K ===
- Kevin Jarvis, baseball player

=== L ===
- Lewis Jarvis (1857–1938), British banker and cricketer
- Lyndall Jarvis, South African model

=== M ===
- Martin Jarvis (actor) (born 1941), British actor
- Martin Jarvis (conductor) (born 1951), Australian conductor and lecturer
- Mary Woodson Jarvis (1842–1924), American civic leader and writer who served as First Lady of North Carolina
- Matt Jarvis, English international footballer
- Mike Jarvis, men's basketball coach

=== N ===
- Nathaniel Jarvis, Welsh footballer

=== O ===
- Oliver Jarvis, British racing car driver

=== P ===
- Pat Jarvis (baseball) (born 1941), American Major League Baseball player
- Pat Jarvis (rugby league) (born 1957), Australian rugby league footballer
- Paul Jarvis, English cricketer
- Peter Jarvis, American musician
- Piret Järvis, Estonian musician

=== R ===
- Ralph Jarvis (born 1965), American player of gridiron football
- Rebecca Jarvis, American financial journalist and former reality show contestant on The Apprentice
- Richard Jarvis (American football) (born 1995), American football player
- Richard Jarvis (businessman) (1829–1903), American businessman and industrialist
- Richard Jarvis (politician) (born 1950), American politician
- Robert Jarvis (disambiguation)
- Robin Jarvis, novelist
- Rossi Jarvis, English footballer
- Ryan Jarvis, English footballer

=== S ===
- Samuel Jarvis (1792–1857), Chief Superintendent of Indian Affairs for Upper Canada
- Sarah Jarvis (born 1962), English general practitioner
- Seth Jarvis (born 2002), Canadian ice hockey player
- Sherri Jarvis (1966–1980), formerly unidentified murder victim found in Texas
- Sid Jarvis (1905–1994), English footballer
- Steve Jarvis (born 1968), American politician and member of the North Carolina Senate

=== T ===
- Thomas Jarvis (1623–1694), Deputy Governor of the Carolina Province
- Thomas J. Jarvis (1836–1915), American politician, United States senator and governor of North Carolina

=== W ===
- Wilfred Lemuel Jarvis (1895–1977), Australian Baptist evangelist
- Will Jarvis (footballer) (born 2002), English footballer
- William Jarvis (disambiguation)

== Given name ==
=== A ===
- Jarvis Astaire, British sports executive, former boxing promoter, and film producer

=== B ===
- Jarvis Blinn (1836–1862), Captain of 14th Connecticut Regiment Infantry's B Company
- Jarvis Brown, Major League Baseball outfielder
- Jarvis Brownlee Jr. (born 2001), American football player

=== C ===
- Jarvis Cocker, English singer-songwriter and frontman for the band Pulp

=== G ===
- Jarvis Giles, American football running back
- Jarvis Green, American football defensive end

=== H ===
- Jarvis Hayes, American professional basketball player
- Jarvis Hunt, American architect

=== J ===
- Jarvis Jenkins, American football defensive end
- Jarvis Johnson, elected official currently holding office as a District Council Member in the city of Houston, Texas District B
- Jarvis Johnson (YouTuber), American YouTuber and former software engineer
- Jarvis Jones, American football linebacker

=== K ===
- Jarvis Kenrick, English association football (soccer) player

=== L ===
- Jarvis Landry, American football wide receiver
- Jarvis Lang, American professional basketball player
- Jarvis Lord (1816–1887), American politician from New York
- Jarvis Lynch, Major General in the U.S. Marine Corps

=== M ===
- Jarvis Moss, American football defensive end

=== O ===
- Jarvis Offutt (1894–1918), aviator from Omaha, Nebraska, who died in World War I

=== P ===
- Jarvis W. Pike (1795–1854), first mayor of Columbus, Ohio

=== R ===
- Jarvis Redwine, American college and professional football player

=== T ===
- Jarvis Tatum, Major League Baseball center fielder
- Jarvis Thornton (born 2006), English footballer
- Jarvis Tyner, American politician

=== V ===
- Jarvis Varnado, college basketball player

=== W ===
- Jarvis Williams (defensive back), American football safety
- Jarvis Williams (wide receiver), American football wide receiver
- Jarvis T. Wright (1830–1886), American businessman and politician

== See also ==
- Järvis (surname)
- Javitz (surname)
