= Yavetz =

Yavetz is a Jewish surname. Notable people with the surname include:

- Ze'ev Yavetz (1847–1924), Polish-Jewish historian, teacher and Hebrew linguist
- Zvi Yavetz (1925–2013), Israeli historian

== See also ==
- Javits (disambiguation)
- Javet (surname)
