= Jarves =

Jarves is a surname. Notable people with the surname include:

- Deming Jarves (1790–1869), American glass manufacturer
- James Jackson Jarves (1818–1888), American newspaper editor and art critic

== See also ==
- Jarvis (name)
- Järvis, an Estonian-language surname
