= James Jarvis =

James or Jim Jarvis may refer to:

- James C. Jarvis (1787–1800), American midshipman posthumously honored by Congress
- Bud Jarvis (James Alexander Jarvis, 1907–1983), Canadian ice hockey player
- James Howard Jarvis II (1937–2007), United States federal judge
- Jim Jarvis (born 1943), American basketball player
- James Jarvis (illustrator) (born 1970), English illustrator, writer and entrepreneur
- James Jarvis (cricketer) (1875–1962), English cricketer

== See also ==
- Jarvis James Hayes (born 1981), American basketball player
- Jarvis (disambiguation)
