= USS Jarvis =

Three ships in the United States Navy have been named USS Jarvis for James C. Jarvis.

- The first USS Jarvis (DD-38) was a Paulding-class destroyer launched in 1912, served in World War I and decommissioned in 1919.
- The second USS Jarvis (DD-393) was a Bagley-class destroyer launched in 1937, served in World War II and sank in battle in August 1942.
- The third USS Jarvis (DD-799) was a Fletcher-class destroyer launched in 1944, served in World War II and the Korean War. She was transferred to the Spanish Navy in 1960.
