= Stanstead =

Stanstead may refer to:

== Canada ==
- Stanstead, Quebec, a city in Canada
- Stanstead, Quebec (township), Canada
- Stanstead (federal electoral district), Quebec, Canada
- Stanstead (Province of Canada electoral district), Canada East, Province of Quebec
- Stanstead (provincial electoral district), Quebec, Canada

== United Kingdom ==
- Stanstead, Suffolk
- Stanstead Abbotts, Hertfordshire

== United States ==
- The Stanstead, a historic building in Cambridge, Massachusetts

== See also ==
- Stanstead-Est, Quebec, a municipality
- London Stansted Airport
- Stansted (disambiguation)
