= Javits =

Javits may refer to:

== People ==
- Jacob Javits (1904–1986), American politician
- Marian Javits (1925–2017), American actress, arts patron, and wife of Jacob Javits
- Eric M. Javits (born 1931), American diplomat, nephew of Jacob Javits

== Facilities and structures ==
- Javits Building, Manhattan building and the tallest federal building in the U.S.
- Javits Center, Manhattan convention center
- Javits Lecture Center, Stony Brook University lecture center

== See also ==
- Javitz, surname
- Javet, surname
- Jarvis (disambiguation)
