= Anna Jarvis (physician) =

Canadian physician

- Education: Physician
- Alma mater: University of the West Indies

Anna Jarvis, also known as Dorothy Anna Jarvis, is a retired professor at the Department of Paediatrics, University of Toronto, and was a staff Physician in the Division of Paediatric Emergency at SickKids. In 2016, she was appointed to the Order of Ontario.

== Early life and education ==
Jarvis is one of seven children; her parents were educators and her father's career took the family to different universities in England, Jamaica, Puerto Rico, Nigeria, and the United States. He later worked at the University of the West Indies, where Jarvis attended medical school.

Jarvis was accepted into the medical program at the University of the West Indies in 1963. Her medical program involved one foundational year of biochemistry, zoology and physics, and was followed by two years of preclinical studies, three years of clinical studies, and an internship year. After completing her compulsory year of internship in general, paediatric, surgery, neurosurgery and paediatric medicine, she got married and moved to Antigua. In Antigua, she started a family medicine practice and began a practice in emergency paediatrics in the Holberton Hospital Casualty Department.

In 1972, Jarvis immigrated to Canada with her husband who was accepted into the anesthesia program at the University of Toronto. Her applications for residency were unsuccessful. However, she was accepted into the paediatric training program at SickKids, where she completed four years of training.

== Career ==
From 1975 to 1976, Jarvis was chief resident of her residency program. Jarvis became an official member of the Department of Paediatrics at SickKids in 1977. In the late 1970s and early 1980s, she worked with Drs. Keith Greenway, Charles Malcomson, and Jose Venturelli to develop PALS Plus, an expanded Canadian version of the Paediatric Advanced Life Support (PALS) course published by the American Heart Association in 1983. Jarvis acted as the Canadian liaison to the Advanced Paediatric Life Support joint task force. From 1988 to 1991, she was the president of the Canadian Paediatric Society's Emergency Medicine Section.

From 1992 to 1998, Jarvis was the medical director of the Division of Emergency Medicine and in 1998 became the medical director of the Child Health Network at SickKids. She led the establishment of paediatric emergency medicine and emergency medicine as accredited Canadian medical specialties. In 1995, with co-authors Cheri Nijssen-Jordan, Terry Klassen, Marilyn Li, David McGillivray and David Warren, she submitted a proposal for paediatric emergency medicine to be recognized as a subspecialty of paediatrics and emergency medicine to the Royal College of Physicians and Surgeons. In 2001, she developed the Paediatric Canadian Triage and Acuity Scale alongside David Warren and Louise Leblanc.

In 2001, Jarvis began an eight-year term as the associate Dean of Health Professions Student Affairs, Faculty of Medicine, University of Toronto. In 2010, Jarvis retired from clinical practice. As of February 2017, she still taught emergency-life support skills to and mentored students at the University of Toronto, the Michener Institute, and SickKids.

In 2016, Jarvis was appointed to the Order of Ontario for her work in children's emergency healthcare. As of 2025, she is a professor emerita at the University of Toronto.

== Honors and awards ==
In 2012, Jarvis received the Physicians Care Award from the Ontario Medical Society. In 2016 she was named to the list of 100 accomplished Black Canadian women. There are two awards in Jarvis' name: the University of Toronto presents the Anna Jarvis Award for Teaching Excellence in Emergency Medicine, and the Canadian Paediatric Society presents the Anna Jarvis Paediatric Emergency Medicine Teaching Award.
