= Rourke Baby Record =

Pediatric record used in Canada

The Rourke Baby Record is a pediatric record widely used in Canada, and provides practice guidelines to physicians for the care of Canadian neonates, infants and toddlers. "The Rourke", as it is called among Canadian family physicians and pediatricians, is published by the Canadian Pediatric Society, and is intended for general use with patients ages 0–5 years. It enables clinicians charged with the care of newborns to track development and physical exam data in a standardized and nationally recognized framework from birth onwards, as well as nutrition, immunization status and other milestones. Because of its centrality to the care of infants in Canada, the Rourke guide is retained with the child's chart and establishes a record of proper care. As such it is also a medicolegal document.

== History ==
- First published in 1979

=== Original Authors ===
- Dr. Leslie Rourke MD, CCFP, MClinSc(FM), FCFP, FRRMS
- Dr. James Rourke MD, CCFP(EM), MClinSc(FM), FCFP, FRRMS, LLD

== Versions ==
A national Canadian version and version specific to Ontario are published

== Recommendations ==
=== Screening Intervals ===
The record is split into four guides focusing on different screening periods by age:

- Guide I: 1 week, 2 weeks (optional), 1 month
- Guide II: 2 months, 4 months, 6 months
- Guide III: 9 months, 12 months, 15 months
- Guide IV: 18 months, 2–3 years, 4–5 years
