= The Stanstead =

- Stanstead, The
- U.S. National Register of Historic Places
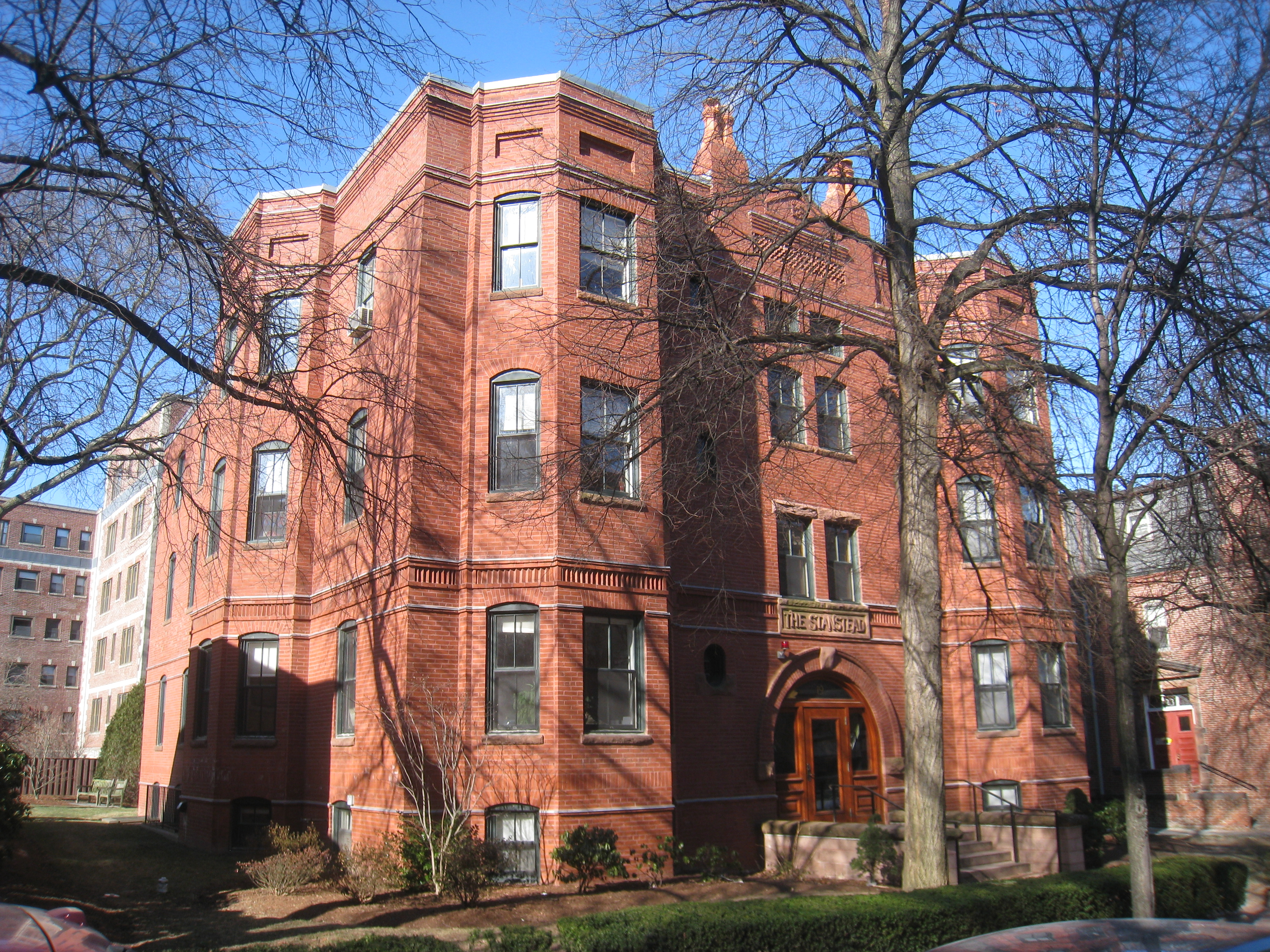

- Location within Massachusetts Location within the United States
- Location: Cambridge, Massachusetts
- Coordinates: 42°22′26″N 71°6′52″W
- Built: 1887
- Architect: J. R. & W. P. Richards
- Architectural style: Romanesque
- MPS: Cambridge MRA
- NRHP reference No.: 86001313
- Added to NRHP: May 19, 1986

The Stanstead is a historic apartment building located at 19 Ware Street in Cambridge, Massachusetts. The three-story Richardsonian Romanesque building was built in 1887, and is an uncommon brick rendition of a triple-decker, more typically a wood-frame construction, that was just becoming popular in Cambridge. The architects, J. R. & W. P. Richards, also designed The Jarvis, another early brick apartment house in the city.

The building was listed on the National Register of Historic Places in 1986.

== See also ==
- National Register of Historic Places listings in Cambridge, Massachusetts
