= Stansted (disambiguation) =

Stansted is an airport in Essex, England.

Stansted may also refer to other places in England:

- Stansted Mountfitchet, Essex
- Stansted, Kent
- Stansted Park, West Sussex

== See also ==
- Stanstead (disambiguation)
