= Jarvis, Missouri =

Unincorporated community in Missouri, U.S.

Coordinates: 38°16′05″N 90°29′39″W

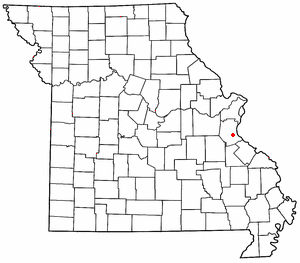

Jarvis is an unincorporated community in Jefferson County, in the U.S. state of Missouri. Jarvis is located approximately 1.5 miles northwest of Mapaville and 2.5 miles southeast of Goldman.

== History ==
A post office called Jarvis was established in 1888, and remained in operation until 1900. The community has the name of Thornton Jarvis, an early settler.
