= USS Jarvis (DD-38) =

Paulding-class destroyer

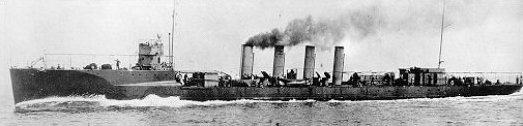
- USS Jarvis (DD-38), running trials on 17 September 1912. Her armament has not yet been installed.

History

United States
- Name: Jarvis
- Namesake: Midshipman James C. Jarvis
- Builder: New York Shipbuilding Company, Camden, New Jersey
- Cost: $641,380.73
- Laid down: 1 July 1911
- Launched: 4 April 1912
- Sponsored by: Mrs. Jean King
- Commissioned: 22 October 1912
- Decommissioned: 26 November 1919
- Stricken: 8 March 1935
- Identification: Hull symbol:DD-38; Code letters:NIB
- Fate: Sold for scrap, 23 April 1935

General characteristics
- Class & type: Paulding-class destroyer
- Displacement: 742 long tons (754 t) normal; 887 long tons (901 t) full load
- Length: 293 ft 10 in (89.56 m)
- Beam: 27 ft (8.2 m)
- Draft: 8 ft 4 in (2.54 m) (mean)
- Installed power: 12,000 ihp (8,900 kW)
- Propulsion: 4 × boilers; 3 × Parsons Direct Drive Turbines; 3 × shafts
- Speed: 29.5 kn (33.9 mph; 54.6 km/h); 30.01 kn (34.53 mph; 55.58 km/h) (Speed on Trial)
- Complement: 4 officers 87 enlisted
- Armament: 5 × 3 in (76 mm)/50 caliber guns; 6 × 18 inch (450 mm) torpedo tubes (3 × 2)

The first USS Jarvis (DD-38) was a modified Paulding-class destroyer in the United States Navy during World War I. She was named for James C. Jarvis.

Jarvis was laid down by the New York Shipbuilding Company, Camden, New Jersey on 1 July 1911; launched on 4 April 1912; sponsored by Mrs. Jean King; and commissioned on 22 October 1912.

== Pre-World War I ==
Following shakedown off Cuba, Jarvis spent a year operating out of Norfolk, Virginia in the Caribbean. She departed Pensacola, Florida on 20 April 1914 for patrols off Tampico and Veracruz, Mexico, during the US occupation of Veracruz. Returning to Norfolk on 16 June, she operated in the Atlantic until departing New York on 26 May 1917 to join US Naval Forces operating in European waters under Vice Admiral William Sims.

== World War I ==
Arriving in Queenstown, Ireland, via St. Nazaire, France on 11 June, she commenced patrol and escort duty along the Irish and English coasts. The operations of destroyers such as Jarvis were of immense value to the Allies in overcoming the German U-boat menace. While not credited with sinking any U-boats, on two occasions Jarvis rescued crews of ships torpedoed by enemy submarines. On 19 June she rescued 41 survivors of SS Batoum off the Irish coast, and she pulled 22 survivors of the British merchantman Purley from the North Sea on 25 July. After recovering Batoum's survivors, she braved a possible torpedo attack and positioned herself between SS Mechanician and a U-boat to protect the merchant ship from enemy torpedoes.

Jarvis operated out of Queenstown until 15 February 1918, when she sailed to Brest, France to guard Allied shipping along the French coast. She patrolled out of Brest until 28 December; then she sailed for the United States. Arriving at Philadelphia, Pennsylvania on 12 January 1919, she resumed operations along the Atlantic Coast. Jarvis returned to Philadelphia on 21 July and decommissioned on 26 November. To comply with the terms of the London Naval Treaty, she was scrapped and her materials sold on 23 April 1935.
