= Javitz =

Javitz, Javits, Jawitz, Yavetz, Yawitz, or variation, is a Jewish surname. For the Biblical sources of the name see Jacob Emden.

People with this name include:

== People ==
- Dan Jawitz (born 1960), South African screen producer
- Jacob Javits (1904-1986), an American politician
- Marian Javits (1925-2017), U.S. actress, arts patron, wife of Jacob K. Javits
- Paul Yawitz (1900-1983), U.S. screenwriter
- Romana Javitz (1903-1980), U.S. librarian
- Ze'ev Yavetz (1847-1924), a Polish-Jewish historian, teacher and Hebrew linguist
- Zvi Yavetz (1925-2013), Israeli historian

== Fictional characters ==
- Javitz (Marvel Comics), a comic book supervillain; see List of Marvel Comics characters: J#Javitz

== See also ==
- Jabez
- Jarvis (name), one way to Anglicize the Jewish surname (though not only used for the Jewish surname)
- Javet (surname)
