= USS Jarvis (DD-393) =

Bagley-class destroyer

Coordinates: 9°42′S 158°59′E

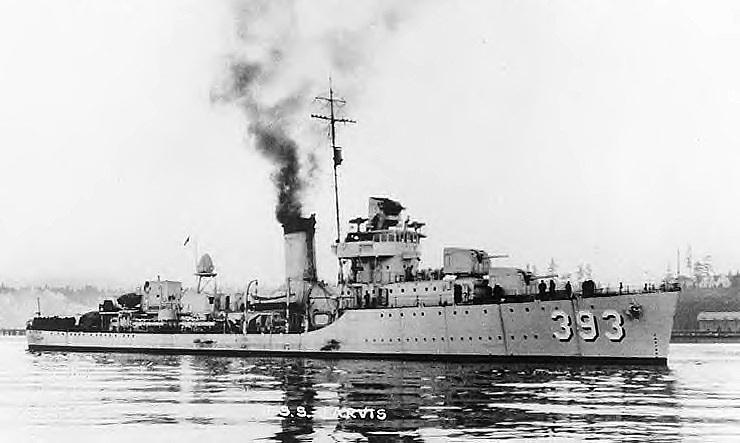
- USS Jarvis off the Puget Sound Navy Yard, circa December 1937

History

United States
- Name: Jarvis
- Namesake: James C. Jarvis
- Builder: Puget Sound Navy Yard
- Laid down: 21 August 1935
- Launched: 6 May 1937
- Commissioned: 27 October 1937
- Fate: Sunk by Japanese aircraft off Guadalcanal 9 August 1942.

General characteristics
- Class & type: Bagley-class destroyer
- Displacement: 2,325 tons (full), 1,500 tons (light)
- Length: 341 ft 8 in (104.1 m)
- Beam: 35 ft 6 in (10.8 m)
- Draft: 12 ft 10 in (3.9 m) full, 10 ft 4 in (3.1 m) light
- Propulsion: 49,000 shp (36,539 kW); 2 propellers
- Speed: 38.5 knots (71.3 km/h; 44.3 mph)
- Range: 6,500 nmi (12,038 km) at 12 knots (22.2 km/h; 13.8 mph)
- Complement: 158 (254 wartime)
- Armament: 4 × 5"/38 caliber guns (12 cm), 4 × .50 cal (12.7 mm) guns, 12 × 21 in (533 mm) torpedo tubes, 2 × depth charge tracks

USS Jarvis (DD-393), was a Bagley-class destroyer and the second of three United States Navy ships to be named after James C. Jarvis, a U.S. Navy midshipman who was killed at the age of 13 during the Quasi-War with France. She saw service in the Pacific during World War II and participated in the invasion of Guadalcanal. The destroyer was sunk to the south of Guadalcanal on 9 August 1942, with all hands - one of only two American major surface warships to be lost in World War II with no survivors.

== Construction and service history ==
The second Jarvis (DD-393) was laid down by Puget Sound Navy Yard, Bremerton, Washington on 21 August 1935 and launched on 6 May 1937; sponsored by Mrs Thomas T Craven, wife of Vice Admiral Craven. Jarvis was commissioned on 27 October 1937.

Clearing Puget Sound on 4 January 1938, Jarvis operated along the California coast and in the Caribbean Sea until 1 April 1940 when she departed San Diego for fleet exercises off the Hawaiian Islands. She arrived at Pearl Harbor on 26 April, patrolled the Pacific to Midway and Johnston Islands and steamed to San Francisco, arriving on 8 February 1941 for an overhaul. Returning to Pearl Harbor on 17 April to commence more than seven months of maneuvers as part of Destroyer Division Eight (DesDiv 8) of Destroyer Squadron Four, she put into Pearl Harbor on 4 December following exercises off Maui Island.

=== Attack on Pearl Harbor ===
Three days later the Japanese executed an attack on Pearl Harbor. Moored next to Mugford in berth B6 of the Navy yard for minor repairs, Jarvis opened fire with 5-inch guns and machine guns and made preparations to get underway. Her gunners claimed four aircraft destroyed, as the first wave of bombers attacked Battleship Row with torpedoes and bombs. Ensign W. F. Greene made the following entry in Jarvis' Deck Log: "0758 Hostilities with Japan commenced with an air raid on Pearl Harbor. Went to General Quarters." Emerging from the attack with no loss of crew and only superficial damage, Jarvis sortied that morning with several cruisers and destroyers to conduct surveillance and anti-submarine warfare (ASW) patrols.

=== First war cruises ===
On 16 December she cleared Pearl Harbor with the aircraft carrier Saratoga and joined Task Force 14, steaming to relieve the beleaguered defenders on Wake Atoll. The task force was recalled to Pearl Harbor on 23 December after the rescue mission was aborted. Jarvis returned to Pearl Harbor on 29 December to resume ASW patrols. While operating with the carrier Lexington and her screening cruisers, Jarvis help rescue 182 survivors of the fleet oiler Neches six hours after she was torpedoed on 23 January 1942.

Jarvis departed Pearl Harbor on 5 February to escort a convoy to Brisbane, Australia. Following her return on 27 March, the destroyer sailed on 8 April for San Francisco to undergo alterations with the other ships of DesRon Four. She returned to Pearl Harbor on 18 May escorting 13 ships and proceeded five days later via Fiji to Sydney, Australia. Arriving on 18 June, Jarvis commenced convoy escort and ASW patrols from Australia to New Caledonia, continuing with this duty until she was tasked to participate in the invasion of Guadalcanal.

=== Guadalcanal campaign ===
Sailing from Sydney on 14 July, Jarvis arrived in Wellington, New Zealand, on 19 July to join Task Force 62. The task force sailed on 22 July for the Solomons. After conducting rehearsal landings in the Fiji Islands from 28 to 30 July, the invasion force of 84 ships and 20,000 Marines steamed for Guadalcanal on 31 July. Protected from Japanese search planes by rain and heavy mist, the force arrived off the landing beaches at dawn on 7 August.

Following naval and air bombardment of enemy defenses, the first amphibious operation of the war commenced at 0650. Jarvis patrolled as part of the protective screen while Marines established a beachhead. As landing operations progressed, the Allied forces expected the Japanese to strike at the transports with land-based aircraft. However, during the two attacks that occurred that afternoon, the American ships sustained only minor damage and claimed to have destroyed 14 attacking aircraft.

Following a night patrol off the southern end of Savo Island, Jarvis returned to Lunga Point to screen the unloading transports. The warning of an impending air attack suspended these operations and the transports and their protective screen deployed in the body of water between Guadalcanal and Florida Island, soon to be called "Ironbottom Sound". When enemy torpedo bombers appeared around noon on 8 August, they met by heavy anti-aircraft fire. Only 9 of the 26 planes penetrated the defensive fire, but they set the attack transport George F. Elliott on fire and torpedoed Jarvis as she maneuvered between the heavy cruiser Vincennes. Although anti-aircraft fire destroyed the aircraft, its torpedo exploded against Jarvis' starboard side near the forward fireroom, stopping her dead in the water and killing 14 crewmen. Her crew jettisoned the port torpedoes and brought the fires under control. The destroyer Dewey towed her to shallow anchorage off Lunga Point and after the attack, she crossed to Tulagi, where she transferred her seven wounded and conducted temporary repairs.

Despite a 50-foot (15 m) gash in her side, she was considered seaworthy and ordered to proceed under cover of darkness to Efate, New Hebrides, escorted by the destroyer minesweeper USS Hovey (DMS-11). Unaware of this order as her radios had been disabled, her commanding officer, Lt. Comdr. William W. Graham Jr, decided to steam to Sydney, Australia, for repairs from the destroyer tender Dobbin. Unnoticed by her own ships, Jarvis departed Tulagi at midnight on 9 August and moved slowly westward between Savo Island and Cape Esperance. At 0134 she passed 3,000 yards (2,743 m) northward of Rear Admiral Mikawa's attacking cruiser force, as they commenced the Battle of Savo Island. Mistaking her for a cruiser of the New Zealand Achilles class, the destroyer Yūnagi briefly engaged her with gunfire and torpedoes, without effect.

The destroyer, continuing to retire westward, had little speed, no radio communications, and few operational guns but she refused aid from the destroyer Blue upon being sighted at 0325. After daybreak a Saratoga-based scout plane sighted her 40 miles off Guadalcanal, trailing fuel oil and down by the bow.

=== Loss of Jarvis ===
The Japanese, still mistaking Jarvis for an escaping cruiser, dispatched 31 planes from Rabaul to search out and destroy her. Once discovered, the badly damaged destroyer was no match for bombers raking the ship with bullets and torpedoes. According to Japanese records, Jarvis "split and sank" at 1300 on 9 August. None of her 233 remaining crew survived.

Jarvis received three battle stars for World War II service.
