= Canadian Paediatric Society =

Canadian professional association

- Industry: Medicine; Pediatrics
- Founded: 1922
- Headquarters: Canada
- Key people: Mark Fieldman, MD President; Jeff Critch, MD President-Elect; Johanne Harvey, MD Vice-President; Ruth Grimes, MD Past President
- Website: cps.ca/en/

The Canadian Paediatric Society (CPS) is a national association of paediatricians.

As a voluntary professional association, the CPS represents more than 3,000 paediatricians, paediatric subspecialists, paediatric residents, and other people who work with and care for children. The CPS is governed by an elected Board of Directors representing each province and territory.

== Activities ==
The CPS is active in several major areas including professional education, advocacy, public education, surveillance and research. The organization is a partner of CANImmunize, a vaccine passport application developed by the Canadian Public Health Association at the Ottawa Hospital Research Institute with funding from the Public Health Agency of Canada.

=== IMPACT ===
The CPS administers the Canadian Immunization Monitoring Program, Active (IMPACT), a national surveillance system for vaccine-preventable diseases and vaccine adverse events in 12 pediatric tertiary care centers across Canada. IMPACT is funded by the Centre for Immunization and Respiratory Infectious Diseases at the Public Health Agency of Canada, with additional funding for surveillance for rotavirus and invasive meningococcal disease provided by GlaxoSmithKline, Merck, Novartis and Pfizer.

=== EPIC ===
The CPS developed the Education Program for Immunization Competencies (EPIC), designed to educate health care providers on how to provide information about vaccinations to their patients. During the COVID-19 pandemic, information about COVID-19 vaccines was added to the curriculum.

Funded by a $726,704 grant from the Public Health Agency of Canada's Immunization Partnership Fund, the CPS organized a workshop and online education module on vaccine hesitancy to increase uptake of COVID-19 vaccines.

=== Awards presented ===
In 2010 the society established the Anna Jarvis Paediatric Emergency Medicine Teaching Award, to honor an educator centered on the teaching of paediatric medicine.

== See also ==
- Academic Pediatric Association
- Rourke Baby Record
