= Javet =

Javet is a French surname. Notable people with the surname include:

- Françoise Javet (1922–2008), French film editor
- Charles Georges Javet (1802–1882), French entomologist

== See also ==
- Javert
- Javits
- Javitz
