= John Jervis =

John Jervis may refer to:

- John Jervis, 1st Earl of St Vincent (1735–1823), Royal Navy admiral
- Sir John Jervis (judge) (1802–1856), British politician, Solicitor General, Attorney General and Privy Counsellor
- John Jervis (MP for Horsham) (1826-?), British MP for Horsham
- John B. Jervis (1795–1885), American civil engineer

== See also ==
- John Jarvis (disambiguation)
