= Jacob K. Javits Lecture Center =

Main lecture center at Stony Brook University, Stony Brook, New York

Coordinates: 40.913179°N 73.122071°W

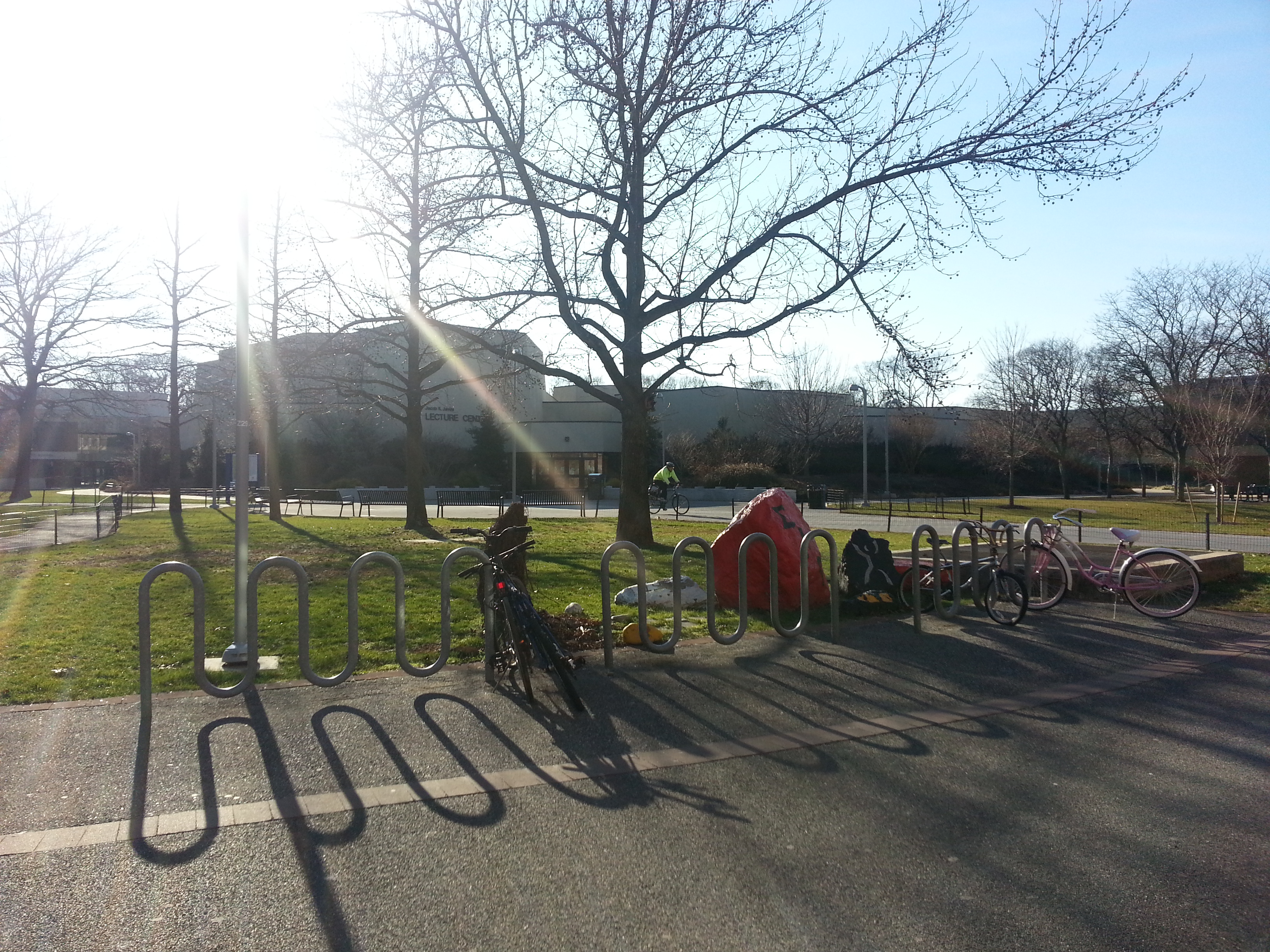
- Type: Public
- Established: c. 1969
- Location: Stony Brook, New York, USA

The Jacob K. Javits Lecture Center also known as Javits Center or Javits for short is the main lecture center at Stony Brook University, Stony Brook, New York. It is located in west campus south of the main Academic Mall.

== Description ==
The Javits Lecture Center houses many of the lecture halls in campus and most of the general first-year courses are lectured here. Javits 100 is the largest lecture hall on campus, with 570 seats including a balcony. Other lecture halls include four 103-seat ones and two 218-seat ones.

Javits also houses the primary audio visual services support office.

The Javits Lecture Center underwent major renovation in 2022-2023. The structural engineers that are taking on this project is Leslie E. Robertson Associates. A local labor union protested the usage of out-of-state contractors from New Jersey in order to complete the $38 million renovation instead of Long Island workers.

The building notably has zero right angles aside from the doors.

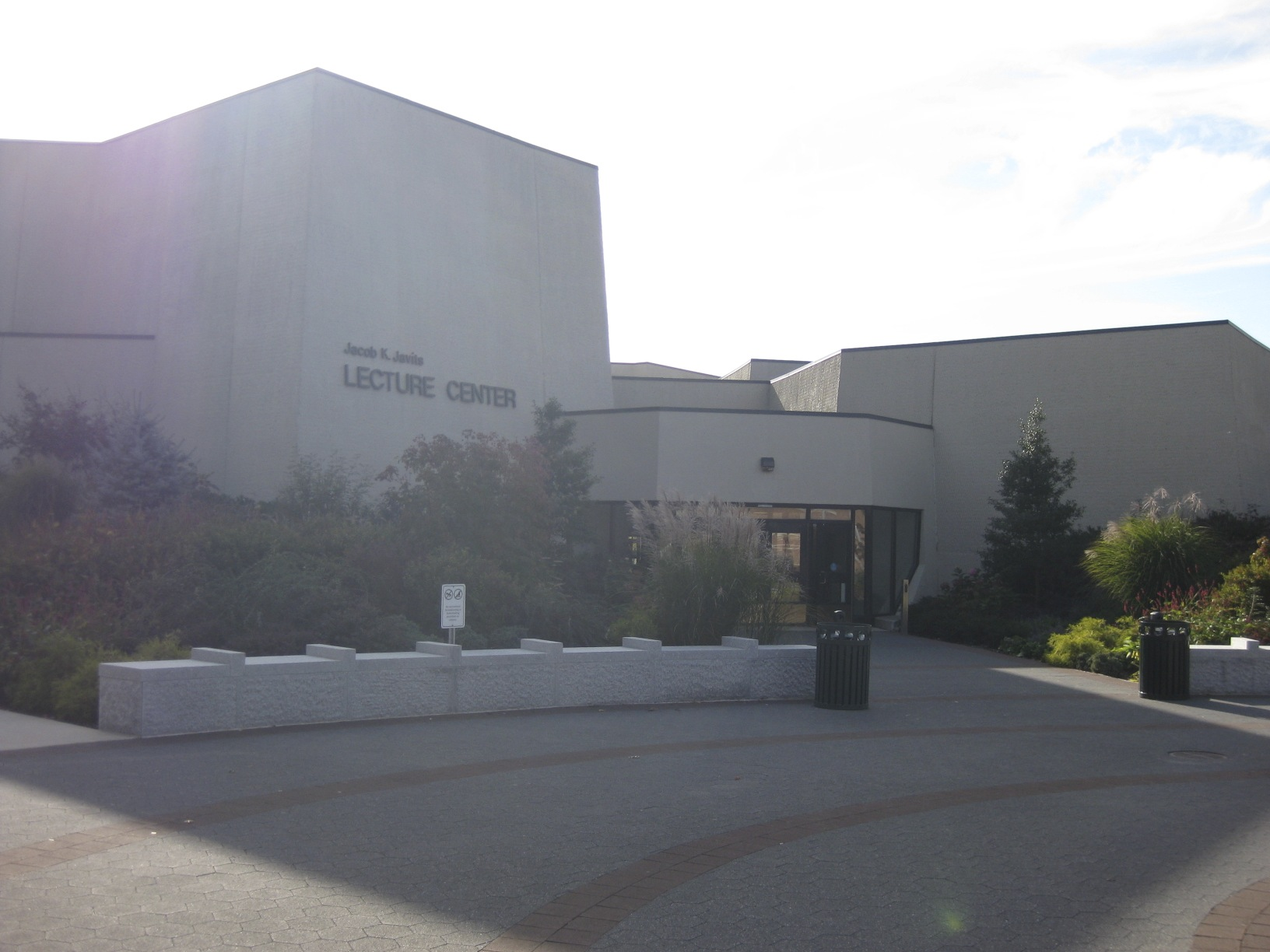
The Northeast entrance of the Jacob K. Javits Lecture Center at Stony Brook
