= Charles Georges Javet =

Swiss-born French insect dealer and entomologist

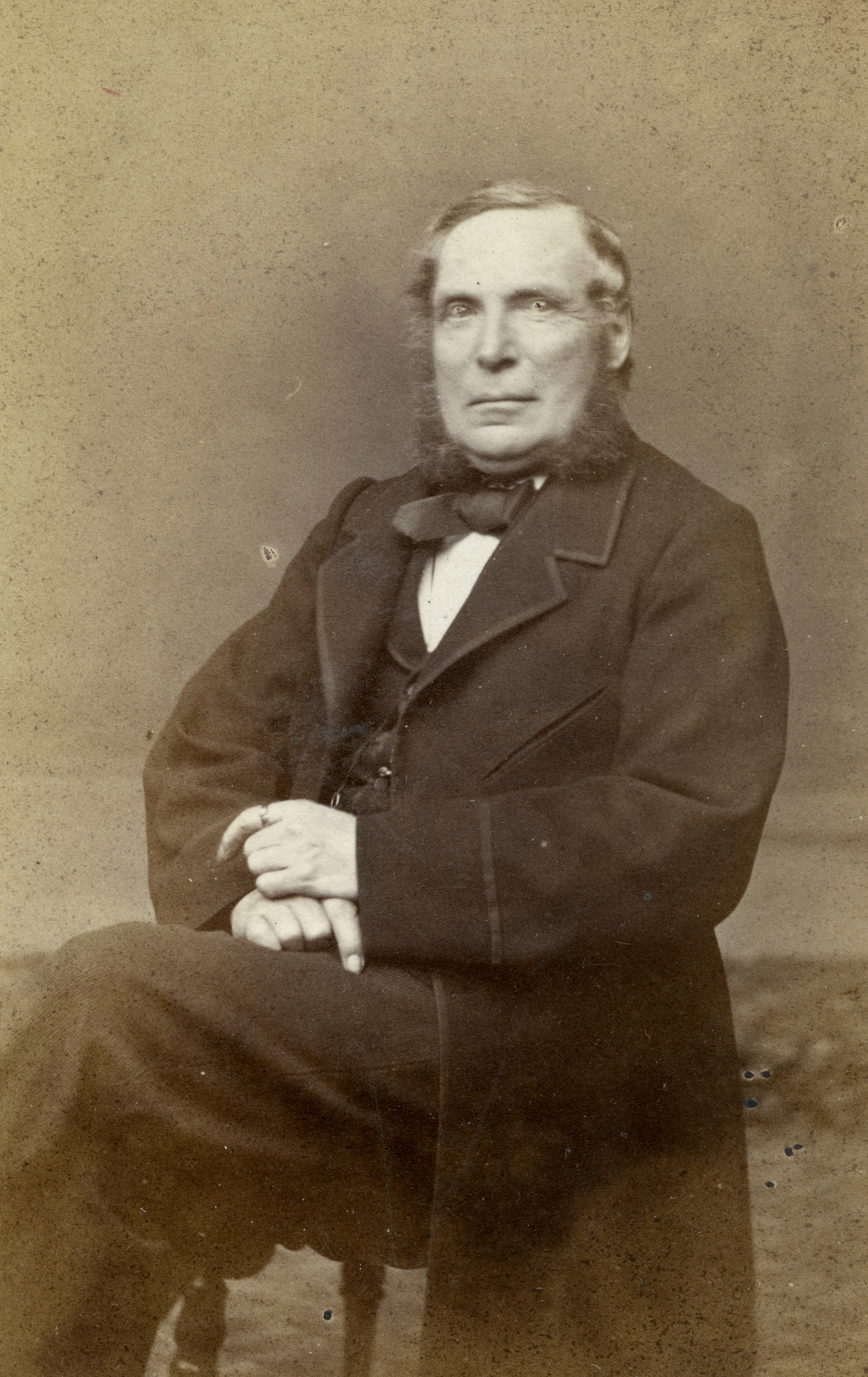

Charles Georges Javet (1802 in Winterthur, Kanton Zürich – 25 May 1882 in Passy, Paris) was a Swiss-born French insect dealer and entomologist. He specialised in Coleoptera.

Javet was a very active member of the Société entomologique de France or Entomological Society of France.

== Partial list of works ==
- 1858. Description d’une nouvelle espèce de Batocera. Archives Entomologiques, Paris. 1:412-413 (1858).
- Note sur le Julodis onopordi. Annales de la Société Entomologique de France, Bulletin (4) 9:xxvi.
