= Jarvis Pass =

Mountain pass in British Columbia, Canada

- Location within British Columbia

Third Approach
- Location: British Columbia, Canada
- Range: Northern Rocky Mountains
- Coordinates: 54°05′26″N 120°09′30″W
- Topo map: NTS 93I1 Jarvis Lakes

Jarvis Pass is a mountain pass in Kakwa Provincial Park in the Northern Rockies of British Columbia, Canada, located to the north of Kakwa Lake, on the British Columbia-Alberta boundary, and therefore is on the Continental Divide. It was one of the many passes surveyed as a route for the Canadian Pacific Railway in the 1870s.

== History ==
On December 9, 1874, explorer E.W. Jarvis and Major C.F. Hanington of Ottawa began an expedition across the Rockies, beginning at Quesnel, with the purpose of determining if the route they traveled could be used by the Canadian Pacific Railway (CPR). In February 1875, Jarvis discovered the pass. The pass, about 10 miles (16 km) from Mount Sir Alexander, proved to be unusable by the CPR because of its 5,000 ft (1,500 m) elevation. Jarvis and Hanington completed their 1,000 mi (1,600 km) journey on May 21, 1875 in Winnipeg. The name of the pass, chosen in E.W. Jarvis' honor, was officially adopted by the Geographical Board on March 31, 1917 and confirmed in December 15, 1982. The mountains to either side of the pass are named Jarvis and Mount Hanington.
