= George Jarvis =

George Jarvis may refer to:

- George Jarvis (cricketer) (1800–1880), English cricketer
- George Jarvis (footballer) (1889–1969), Scottish footballer
- George Jarvis (Muay Thai) (born 2000), British Muay Thai fighter
- George Jarvis (Philhellene) (1797–1828), American Philhellene who took part in the Greek Revolution
- George A. Jarvis (1806–1893), American businessman and philanthropist
- George Stephen Benjamin Jarvis (1797–1878), judge and political figure in Upper Canada
