= Advanced Pediatric Life Support =

US healthcare education program

Advanced Pediatric Life Support (APLS) is a program created by the American Academy of Pediatrics and the American College of Emergency Physicians to teach health care providers how to take care of sick children.

== Pediatric assessment triangle ==
The pediatric assessment triangle is one of the core components of the APLS instruction course. Assessment of a sick child is based on a quick examination of their appearance, breathing, and circulation. The appearance is determined by an examination of tone, how interactive the child is, if they are consolable, their gaze, and the quality of their speech or cry.

== Topics discussed ==
- Pediatric Assessment
- Pediatric Airway in Health and Disease
- Shock
- Cardiovascular System
- Central Nervous System
- Trauma
- Child Maltreatment
- Nontraumatic Surgical Emergencies
- Nontraumatic Orthopedic Emergencies
- Medical Emergencies
- Neonatal Emergencies
- Procedural Sedation and Analgesia
- Children With Special Health Care Needs

- PALS Essentials
- ED and Office Preparedness for Pediatric Emergencies
- Metabolic Disease
- Environmental Emergencies
- Toxicology
- Interface With EMS
- Disaster Management
- Preparedness for Acts of Nuclear, Biological, and Chemical Terrorism
- Ambulatory Orthopedics in the ED
- Medical-Legal Considerations
- Imaging Strategies and Considerations
- Office Procedures
- Critical Procedures

== See also ==
- Pediatric advanced life support (PALS)
