= James Jarvis (cricketer) =

English cricketer

Personal information
- Full name: James Edward Frisby Jarvis
- Born: 21 January 1875; Leicester, Leicestershire, England
- Died: 24 January 1962 (aged 87); Knighton, Leicestershire, England
- Batting: Right-handed
- Role: Wicket-keeper

Domestic team information
- Years: Team
- 1900: Leicestershire

Career statistics
Competition	First-class
Matches	1
Runs scored	0
Batting average	0.00
100s/50s	–/–
Top score	0*
Balls bowled	–
Wickets	–
Bowling average	–
5 wickets in innings	–
10 wickets in match	–
Best bowling	–
Catches/stumpings	1/1
- Source: Cricinfo, 16 January 2013

James Edward Frisby Jarvis (21 January 1875 – 24 January 1962) was an English cricketer. Jarvis was a right-handed batsman who played as a wicket-keeper. He was born at Leicester, Leicestershire.

Jarvis made a single first-class appearance for Leicestershire against Middlesex at Lord's in the 1900 County Championship. In Leicestershire's first-innings of 184 all out, Jarvis batted at number eleven and was dismissed for a duck by J. T. Hearne. In their second-innings, he ended not out without scoring. Middlesex won the match by 5 wickets. This was his only major appearance for the county.

He died at Knighton, Leicestershire on 24 January 1962.
