= William Jarvis =

William Jarvis may refer to:

- William H. Jarvis (1930–2016), member of the Canadian House of Commons
- William T. Jarvis (1935–2016), health educator and skeptic
- William Jarvis (Upper Canada official) (1756–1817), militia officer and official in Upper Canada
- William Botsford Jarvis (1799–1864), Upper Canada political figure associated with the Rosedale and Yorkville neighbourhoods of Toronto
- William Jarvis (merchant) (1770–1859), American diplomat and sheep rancher
- William Jarvis (Australian politician) (1871–1939), member of the Tasmanian Parliament
- William Jarvis (rower), Australian rower at the 1924 Olympics
- William Dummer Jarvis (1834-1914), first commissioned officer in the North-West Mounted Police
- William Esmond Jarvis, former Canadian High Commissioner to New Zealand
- Will Jarvis (footballer) (born 2002), English footballer
