= USS Jarvis (DD-799) =

Fletcher-class destroyer

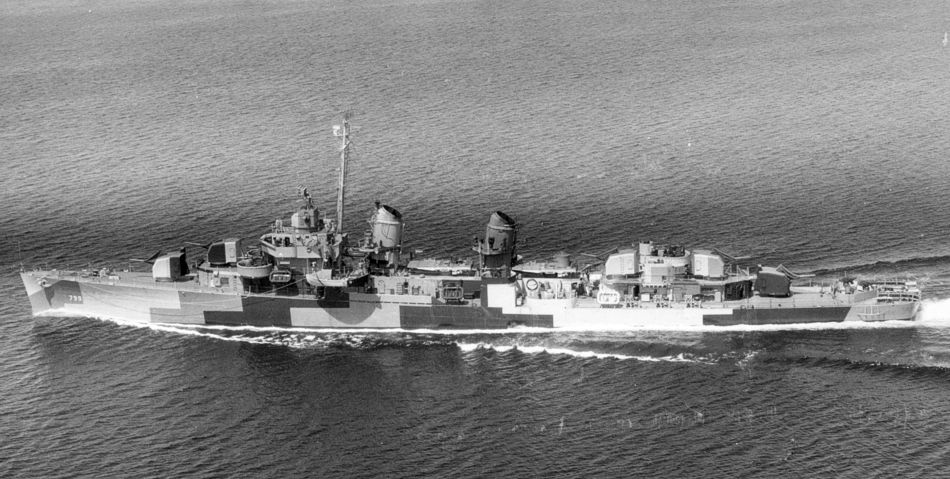
- Jarvis underway, circa 1944

History

United States
- Name: Jarvis
- Namesake: James C. Jarvis (1787–1800), midshipman killed in action
- Builder: Seattle-Tacoma Shipbuilding Corporation, Seattle, Washington
- Laid down: 7 June 1943
- Launched: 14 February 1944
- Commissioned: 3 June 1944
- Decommissioned: 29 June 1946
- Recommissioned: 8 February 1951
- Decommissioned: 24 October 1960
- Fate: Loaned to Spain 3 November 1960; Permanently transferred to Spain 1 December 1972
- Stricken: 1 October 1972

Spain
- Name: Alcalá Galiano
- Namesake: Antonio Alcalá Galiano (1789–1865), Spanish Minister of the Navy
- Acquired: 3 November 1960
- Commissioned: 3 November 1960
- Decommissioned: 15 Decenmber 1988
- Stricken: 15 December 1988
- Fate: Scrapped

General characteristics (as built)
- Class & type: Fletcher-class destroyer
- Displacement: 2,050 tons
- Length: 376 ft 6 in (114.76 m)
- Beam: 39 ft 8 in (12.09 m)
- Draft: 17 ft 9 in (5.41 m)
- Propulsion: 60,000 shp (44,742 kW); geared turbines; 2 screws
- Speed: 35 knots (65 km/h; 40 mph)
- Range: 6,500 nmi (12,000 km; 7,500 mi) at 15 knots (28 km/h; 17 mph)
- Complement: 329
- Armament: 5 × 5 in (127 mm) dual purpose guns; 10 × 40 mm antiaircraft (AA) guns; 7 × 20 mm AA guns; 10 × 21 in (53 cm) torpedo tubes; 6 × depth charge projectors; 2 × depth charge tracks

General characteristics (1966 modernization)
- Class & type: Lepanto-class destroyer
- Displacement: 2,050 tons
- Length: 114.76 m (376 ft 6 in)
- Beam: 12.09 m (39 ft 8 in)
- Draft: 5.41 m (17 ft 9 in)
- Propulsion: 60,000 shp (44,742 kW); geared turbines; 2 screws
- Speed: 35 knots (65 km/h; 40 mph)
- Range: 6,500 nmi (12,000 km; 7,500 mi) at 15 knots (28 km/h; 17 mph)
- Complement: 281
- Sensors & processing systems: 1 x AN/SPS-6C 2-D air-search radar; 1 x AN/SPS-10 surface-search radar; 1 x hull-mounted AN/SQS-29 sonar array; 1 x Mk 37 director with a Mk 25 fire control radar (5-inch battery); 1 x Mk 56 gun fire control system with a Mk 35 radar (3-inch battery); 2 x Mk 63 blind-firing optical directors with AN/SPG-34 radars (3-inch battery); 1 x Mk 27 torpedo fire control system
- Electronic warfare & decoys: 1 x AN/WLR-1 electronic countermeasures receiver; 1 x T-Mk 6 Fanfare towed acoustic torpedo decoy system
- Armament: 4 × 5-inch/38-caliber (127 mm) Dual-purpose guns; 3 × twin 3-inch/50-caliber (76.2 mm) antiaircraft (AA) gun mounts; 2 x Mark 4 Mod 1 side-loading torpedo racks (canastas) (removed 1973); 2 x Mk 11 Hedgehog anti-submarine mortars; 4 x Mk 6 K-guns (depth-charge projectors); 1 x starboard-mounted Mk 9 Mod 0 depth charge release track (configured for Mk 6 or Mk 9 depth charges); 1 × triple 21 in (533 mm) torpedo tube mount for Mark 15 torpedoes; 2 x triple Mk 32 torpedo tubes firing 12.75-inch (324 mm) Mk 44 or Mk 46 active acoustic homing torpedoes (installed 1973)

USS Jarvis (DD-799) was a Fletcher-class destroyer of the United States Navy in commission from 1944 to 1946 and from 1951 to 1960. Jarvis was the third U.S. Navy ship named for Midshipman James C. Jarvis (1787–1800), who was killed in action at the age of 13 during an engagement between the frigate Constellation and the French Navy frigate La Vengeance.

After the completion of her U.S. Navy service, Jarvis was transferred to Spain in 1960. Renamed Alcalá Galiano — for Antonio Alcalá Galiano (1789–1865), a Spanish minister of the navy — she was in commission in the Spanish Navy from 1960 to 1988.

== Construction and commissioning ==
Jarvis was laid down by the Seattle-Tacoma Shipbuilding Corporation in Seattle, Washington on 7 June 1943. She was launched 14 February 1944, sponsored by Mrs. Harold Burkit, daughter of Rufus C. Holman, United States Senator from Oregon, and was commissioned on 3 June 1944.

== United States Navy service ==
=== World War II ===
After shakedown in the Pacific Ocean off the California coast, Jarvis departed Seattle on 25 August 1944 for Pearl Harbor, Hawaii, as escort for the battleship USS South Dakota (BB-57). Arriving on 31 August, she proceeded independently on 3 September 1944 to Adak, Alaska, to join the North Pacific Force, engaged in operations against Japanese force in the Kuril Islands. Operating from Adak and Attu, Jarvis battled stormy seas and prolonged bad weather to conduct eight raids on shipping and shore installations in the Kurils from Paramushiro to Matsuwa. She returned to Adak from her last raid on 15 August 1945, the day hostilities ended between the United States and Japan.

In the immediate aftermath of the war,Jarvis steamed to Aomori on Honshū in Japan to support Allied occupation operations. Arriving at Aomori on 8 September 1945, she operated the Sea of Japan, assisting occupation landings and destroying Japanese military installations on Honshū and Hokkaidō.

Jarvis departed Yokosuka, Honshū, on 19 November 1945 for the United States. Arriving at Pearl Harbor on 29 November, she joined the Operation Magic Carpet fleet, tasked with returning U.S. military personnel to the United States after the war. She departed Pearl Harbor on 1 December 1944 carrying personnel returning to the United States East Coast. She stopped at Naval Station San Diego in San Diego, California, passed through the Panama Canal, and reached the Charleston Navy Yard at Charleston, South Carolina on 22 December 1945.

Jarvis was deactivated as a unit of the Atlantic Reserve Fleet on 11 April 1946. She was decommissioned on 29 June 1946.

=== 1951 – 1960 ===
The Korean War broke on 25 June 1950, and Jarvis was recommissioned on 8 February 1951. She operated with the United States Atlantic Fleet from Charleston and from Naval Station Norfolk in Norfolk, Virginia, for more than a year before departing Norfolk on 15 May 1952 for deployment to the waters off the Korean Peninsula. Steaming via the Panama Canal, the United States West Coast, and Japan, she arrived off the eastern coast of Korea on 23 June 1952 and began blockade and interdiction patrols in the United States Seventh Fleet between Songjin and Chongjin before returning to Yokosuka, Japan, on 18 August 1952. Following operations in Japanese waters, she joined the Formosa Patrol from 26 September to 10 October 1952. She then proceeded to the Philippine Islands, from which she departed on 18 October. Getting underway from Subic Bay that day, she made her return voyage to the United States, stopping at Ceylon, passing through the Suez Canal, and visiting Gibraltar before reaching Norfolk on 12 December 1952.

With the Cold War well underway, Jarvis resumed operations with the U.S. Atlantic Fleet, and on 4 May 1954 got underway from Norfolk for a deployment to the Mediterranean Sea. She arrived at Naples, Italy, on 18 May 1954 and subsequently operated with the United States Sixth Fleet in the Mediterranean. Before returned to Norfolk on 9 July 1954.

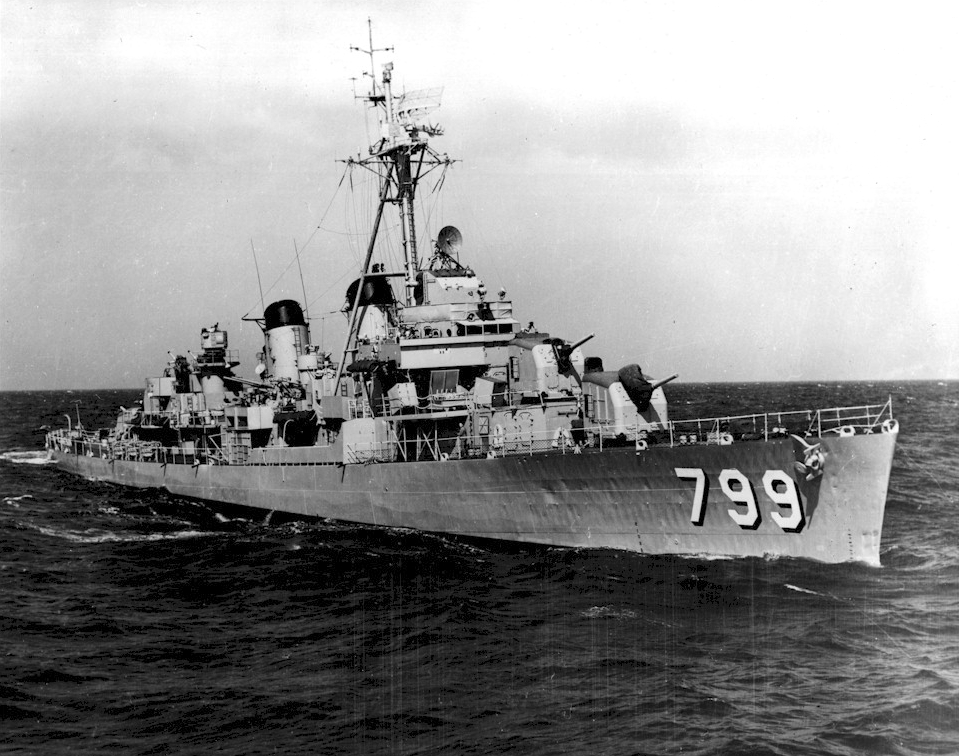
Jarvis in the late 1950s.

Jarvis departed Norfolk on 5 January 1955 bound for the U.S. West Coast, arriving at Naval Station Long Beach in Long Beach, California, on 26 January. After training off the California Coast, she departed on 21 April 1955 for the first of five post-Korean War deployments to the Far East. As a unit of the U.S. Seventh Fleet, she operated in East Asian waters from Japan to the Philippines. During all her deployments she conducted patrols in the Formosa Strait to help prevent an invasion of Taiwan, which was under the control of the Nationalist government of the Republic of China, by the People's Republic of China. During her 1955 deployment, she also supported the evacuation of thousands of refugees from North Vietnam to South Vietnam during Operation Passage to Freedom. In 1958 she support to Chinese Nationalist forces during the Second Taiwan Strait Crisis, in which Communist Chinese forces threatened to invade the Nationalist held islands of Quemoy and Matsu.

Jarvis returned to Long Beach from her fifth and final Far Eastern deployment on 4 March 1960 and resumed operations along the U.S. West Coast until 24 September 1960, when she sailed for the U.S.East Coast. She arrived at the Philadelphia Navy Yard in Philadelphia, Pennsylvania, on 16 October 1960. She was decommissioned on 24 October 1960 and entered the Atlantic Reserve Fleet.

On 3 November 1960, the United States loaned the ship to Spain. The ship was stricken from the U.S. naval register and sold to Spain on 1 October 1972, and her transfer to Spain officially became permanent on 1 December 1972.

=== Awards ===
Jarvis received one battle star each for World War II and Korean War service.

- Asiatic-Pacific Campaign Medal with one battle star
- Korean Service Medal with one battle star

== Spanish Navy service ==
On 3 November 1960 the United States transferred the ship to Spain at Philadelphia as a five-year renewable loan under the terms of the Military Assistance Program. She served the Spanish Navy as Alcalá Galiano. In January 1960, the Spanish Navy had changed its pennant number system to match that of used by the navies of the North Atlantic Treaty Organization (NATO). In Spanish service, she was classified as an antisubmarine destroyer.

After training in the waters of the United States, Alcalá Galiano made her delivery voyage to Spain, arriving at Cartagena on 2 January 1961. She became one of five Fletcher-class destroyers to serve in the Spanish Navy — in which they were known as the Lepanto-class destroyer — joining the other four in the 21st Destroyer Squadron at the Cartagena Naval Base. The Spanish Navy nicknamed the five ships Los Cinco Latinos ("The Five Latinos") after a popular musical group of the era of that name whose lead singer was Estela Raval.

In November 1960, Alcalá Galiano took part in exercises in the Mediterranean Sea off Cartagena with ships of the French Navy. The exercises involved antisubmarine warfare, underway replenishment, and the transfer of cargo and supplies between ships at sea. In December 1960, she and the other ships of her flotilla participated in the SPANEX 3 exercise in off Malta with ships of the British Royal Navy. On 4 January 1962, the Spanish Navy reclassified the five Lepanto-class ships as "destroyers." Still based at Cartagena, they became part of Force F, the Spanish Navy's main fleet.

The standard operational doctrine of the Spanish Navy dictated that each maritime department conduct at least two major naval exercises annually. These were supplemented by general fleet-wide maneuvers, amphibious warfare training in support of the Spanish Marine Infantry, and unit-level operational deployments. Combined with joint international exercises, these requirements resulted in an average fleet operational tempo of approximately 90 days at sea per vessel annually.

In 1966, Alcalá Galiano underwent a modernization of her weapon, sensor, and electronic warfare suites. Her single pole mast was replaced by a tripod mast, which was more able to support the increased weight of these systems. She officially was on loan to Spain until 1 October 1972, when the Spanish Navy purchased her for a nominal fee. In 1973, she underwent another modernization in which her MK-4-1 torpedo launch racks were removed and replaced by power-driven triple-torpedo tube mounts and associated electronic systems were installed.

In 1983, Alcalá Galiano transferred from the 21st Destroyer Squadron to the Spanish Navy's Maritime Action Forces to serve with reduced equipment on high-seas patrol duties related to the enforcement of Spanish sovereignty, maritime security, and constabulary duties in the Maritime Zone of the Strait in the vicinity of the Strait of Gibraltar. In a test during maneuvers held on 20 May 1985, she reached a maximum speed of 34.5 knots (63.9 km/h; 39.7 mph), which she maintained for 30 minutes, and over the course of the six-hour test maintained an average speed of 30.5 knots (56.5 km/h; 35.1 mph) despite her combined 41 years in service in the U.S. Navy and Spanish Navy.

In June 1985, Alcalá Galiano responded quickly to an urgent request for assistance from the Spanish Customs Surveillance Service, which had received intelligence that a Panamanian-flagged vessel named Lady K was smuggling narcotics. Alcalá Galiano intercepted Lady K and forced her to heave to by maneuvering to within 200 metres (220 yd) of Lady K and training her four 5-inch (127mm) guns directly on the vessel. With Lady K secured, a Customs Surveillance Service boarding party took control of Lady K and Alcalá Galiano escorted her into Cádiz.

Worn out after over 44 years of service, Alcalá Galiano was decommissioned and stricken from the Spanish naval register on 15 December 1988. She subsequently was scrapped.
