= John Jarvis =

John Jarvis may refer to:

- Sir John Jarvis, 1st Baronet (1876–1950), British Conservative politician, MP for Guildford
- John Jarvis (set decorator), film set decorator
- John Arthur Jarvis (1872–1933), British swimmer
- John Barlow Jarvis (born 1954), American songwriter and pianist
- John T. Jarvis (1847–1932), mayor of Riverside, California, United States
- John Wesley Jarvis (1780–1839), American painter
- John Jarvis (born 1979), American musician, former bassist of Pig Destroyer
- Jack Jarvis (1887–1968), British racehorse trainer

== See also ==
- John Jervis (disambiguation)
