= Sid Jarvis =

English footballer (1905–1994)

Personal information
- Full name: Sidney Jarvis
- Date of birth: 14 September 1905
- Place of birth: Sheffield, England
- Date of death: 1994 (aged 88–89)
- Height: 6 ft 0 in (1.83 m)
- Position: Full-back

Senior career*
Years	Team	Apps	(Gls)
1923–1924	Ecclesall Church		
1924–1925	Nether Edge Amateurs		
1925–1926	Hull City	0	(0)
1926	Darlington	0	(0)
1926	Kettering Town		
1926	Raith Rovers		
1927–1935	Middlesbrough	86	(1)
1935–1936	Olympique Dunkerquois		
1936	Darlington	0	(0)
Total		86	(1)
- * Club domestic league appearances and goals

Sidney Jarvis (14 September 1905 – 1994) was an English footballer who played in the Football League for Middlesbrough.
