= Mapaville, Missouri =

- Unincorporated community
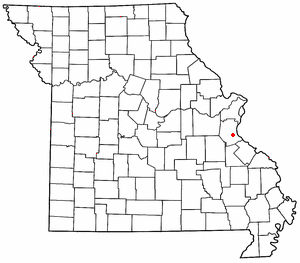
- Interactive map of Mapaville, Missouri
- Coordinates: 38°14′56″N 90°29′00″W
- Country: United States
- State: Missouri
- County: Jefferson
- Time zone: UTC-6 (Central (CST))
  - Summer (DST): UTC-5 (CDT)
- Area code: 636

Mapaville is an unincorporated community in Jefferson County, Missouri, United States. It is located approximately halfway between Festus and Hillsboro, at the intersection of routes A and Z.
