= Robert Jarvis =

Robert or Bob Jarvis may refer to:

- Robert Jarvis (rugby league), English rugby league player
- Bob Jarvis (politician) (1935–2017), member of the House of Commons of Canada
- Cob Jarvis (1932–2014, Robert Winston Jarvis), basketball player and coach
- Bob Jarvis (rugby league) (born 1950), New Zealand rugby league player
- Bob Jarvis (sport shooter), British sports shooter
- Rob Jarvis, English television and film actor
- Robbie Jarvis (born 1986), British actor
- Pat Jarvis (baseball) (born 1941, Robert Patrick Jarvis), American baseball player
