= Jarvis Park =

Park in Maryville, Tennessee, U.S.

Coordinates: 35°44′20″N 83°57′20″W

Jarvis Park is a park located in Maryville, Tennessee, and is managed by the City of Maryville and Foothills Land Conservancy. The 11 acre woodlands Park is off Court St. east of Downtown Maryville. It borders the Vulcan Materials Company rock quarry and is across the street from Blount United Soccer Club fields. The park is named after Dr. Craig Jarvis, donator of the land to the city.

== History ==
The land was originally owned by John Duncan who received it as compensation for his service in the revolutionary war from the original owners, the Crawford family. The land was later purchased by James Cornett, who built and lived on the land while preserving the wooded area. The land was later purchased by Dr. Craig Jarvis. Dr. Jarvis placed the property in a conservation easement held by Foothills Land Conservancy.

== Features ==
The park features three quarters of a mile worth of trails that show off historic oak trees and takes you through a bamboo forest.

== Future ==
Park's full size is 47 acres (19 ha). The City hopes to eventually add more to the park.
