= Zvi Yavetz =

Israeli historian and professor

- צבי יעבץ
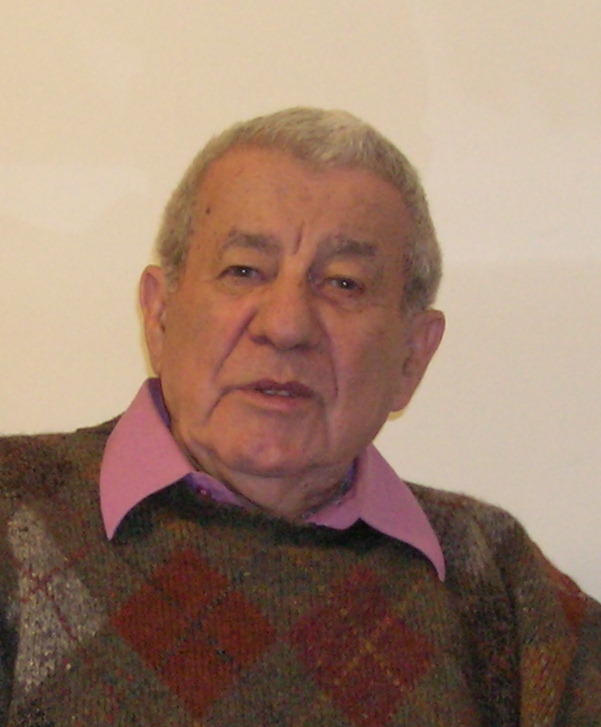
- Born: 26 April 1925; Czernowitz, Ukraine
- Died: 7 January 2013 (aged 87)
- Citizenship: Israel
- Education: Hebrew University of Jerusalem
- Known for: Ancient history research
- Scientific career
- Workplaces: Tel Aviv University

Zvi Yavetz (Hebrew: צבי יעבץ; 26 April 1925 – 7 January 2013) was an Israeli historian. He was a professor of ancient history at Tel Aviv University.

== Biography ==
Zvi Zucker (later Yavetz) was born in Czernowitz, Ukraine. When he was five years old, he was diagnosed with polio and his father committed suicide. After the German occupation in 1941, he was sent to a concentration camp. His relatives, including his mother, were murdered, but he survived the Holocaust and escaped in 1944. Arriving in Turkey, he was transferred to Cyprus and eventually reached Mandatory Palestine.

Initially, Yavetz joined a kibbutz in the Jordan valley. Then he left to study modern history at the Hebrew University of Jerusalem. While at university, Yavetz worked as a teacher for deaf and speech impaired children. He received a master's degree and PhD in history, classics and sociology in 1950 and 1956, respectively. In 1960, he carried out post-doctoral research at University of London and Lund University.

Yavetz died in January 2013 and was buried at Kibbutz Tel Yitzhak cemetery.

== Academic and literary career ==
After completing his PhD, Yavetz helped to found Tel Aviv University. In 1956, he was named the department chair of general history and later, dean of humanities faculty at the university.

In 2008, Yavetz published his autobiography, My Czernowitz. He adopted his mother's family name, Yavetz, when he learned that all members of her family had been killed in the Holocaust.

== Awards and recognition ==
In 1990, Yavetz was awarded the Israel Prize for humanities. In 1997, he was awarded a doctorate (Honoris Causa) from Beer Sheba University and LMU Munich.
