= The Jarvis =

- U.S. National Register of Historic Places
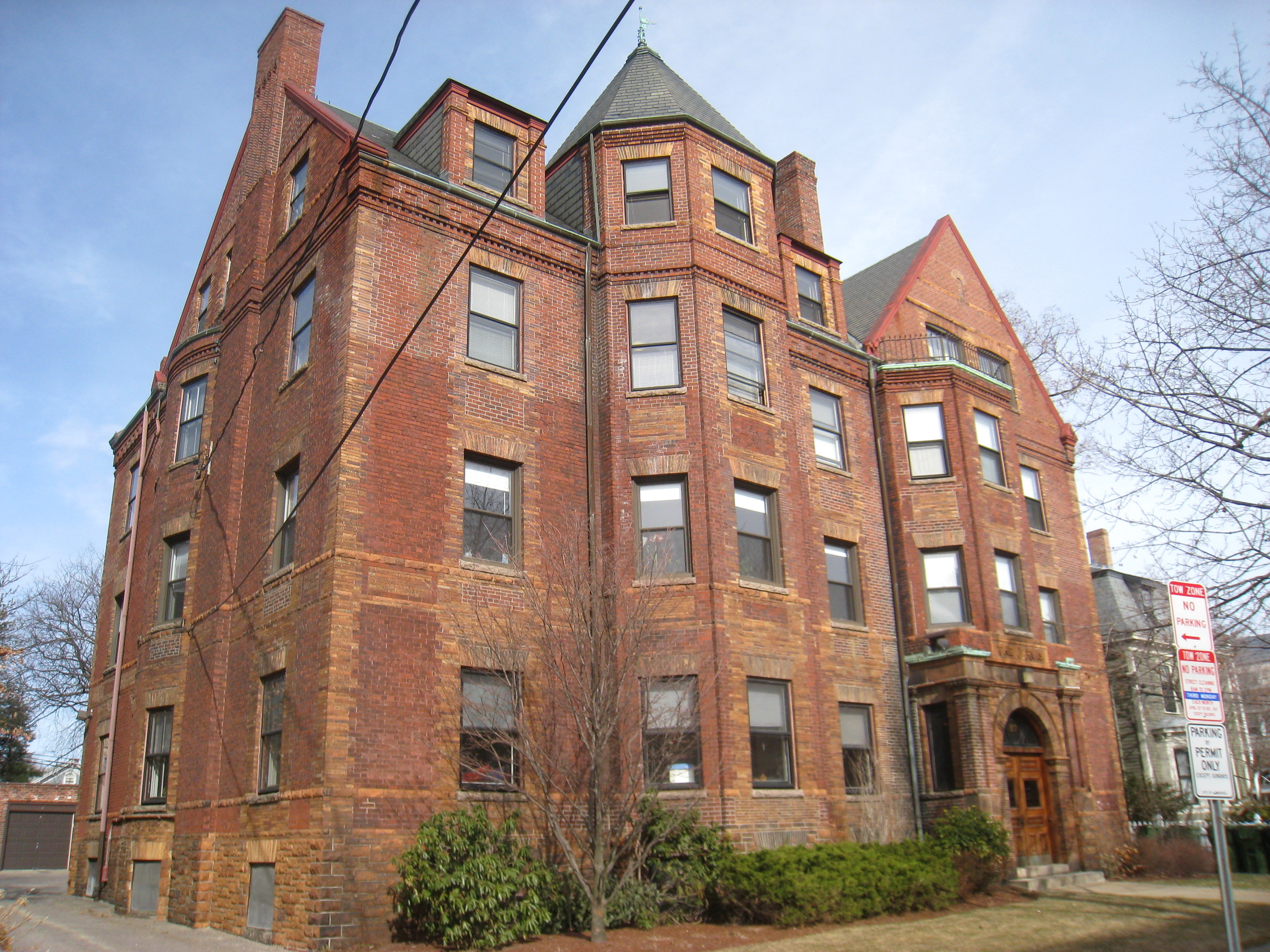

- Location within Massachusetts Location within the United States
- Location: Cambridge, Massachusetts
- Coordinates: 42°22′48.4″N 71°7′3.3″W
- Built: 1890; 136 years ago
- Architect: J. R. & W. P. Richards
- Architectural style: Queen Anne
- MPS: Cambridge MRA
- NRHP reference No.: 86001308
- Added to NRHP: May 19, 1986

The Jarvis is a historic apartment building at 27 Everett Street, on the north side of the Harvard University campus in Cambridge, Massachusetts. Built in 1890, the 4 1/2-story brick building was one of the first apartment houses built in the vicinity of northern Massachusetts Avenue. At the time, Massachusetts Avenue north of Harvard was predominantly lined with large fashionable houses. The Jarvis fit into this to some extent by being designed to resemble a large single family residence of the time. The building has irregular Queen Anne massing, polychrome trim, and massive corbelled end chimneys.

The building was listed on the National Register of Historic Places in 1986.

== See also ==
- National Register of Historic Places listings in Cambridge, Massachusetts
