= Järvis =

Family name

Järvis is an Estonian-language surname. Notable people with the surname include:

- Ene Järvis (1947–2025), actress
- Piret Järvis (born 1984), singer, guitarist, and songwriter

== See also ==
- Jarvis (name)
