= James C. Jarvis =

American naval officer (1787–1800)

James Canon Jarvis (c. 1787 – 2 February 1800) was a midshipman in the United States Navy during the Quasi-War with France.

Jarvis was the son of James Jarvis of New York. He was appointed a midshipman from New York in 1799. Midshipman Jarvis was killed at the age of 13 during the historic engagement between the famed frigate Constellation and the French frigate La Vengeance on 2 February 1800. Sent aloft in command of the topmen to secure Constellation's unsupported mainmast, he refused to come down when warned that the mast might topple: "My post is here. I can't leave it until ordered." As the mast crashed, Jarvis was swept over the side with the falling rigging.

Honoring Jarvis for his bravery and devotion to duty, the Sixth Congress by Joint Resolution 29 March 1800 deemed his conduct "deserving of the highest praise" and his loss "a subject of National regret."

"Resolved, That the conduct of James Jarvis, a midshipman in said frigate, who gloriously preferred certain death to an abandonment of his post, is deserving of the highest praise; and that the loss of so promising an officer is a subject of national regret." Thomas Hart Benton, Abridgment of the Debates of Congress, from 1789 to 1856, Vol. II, p. 471.

In 1937, the US Navy named a destroyer after James C. Jarvis. The USS Jarvis (DD-393) was sunk with all hands off Guadalcanal on August 9, 1942. In 1944, a second destroyer was named after Jarvis (DD-799).
