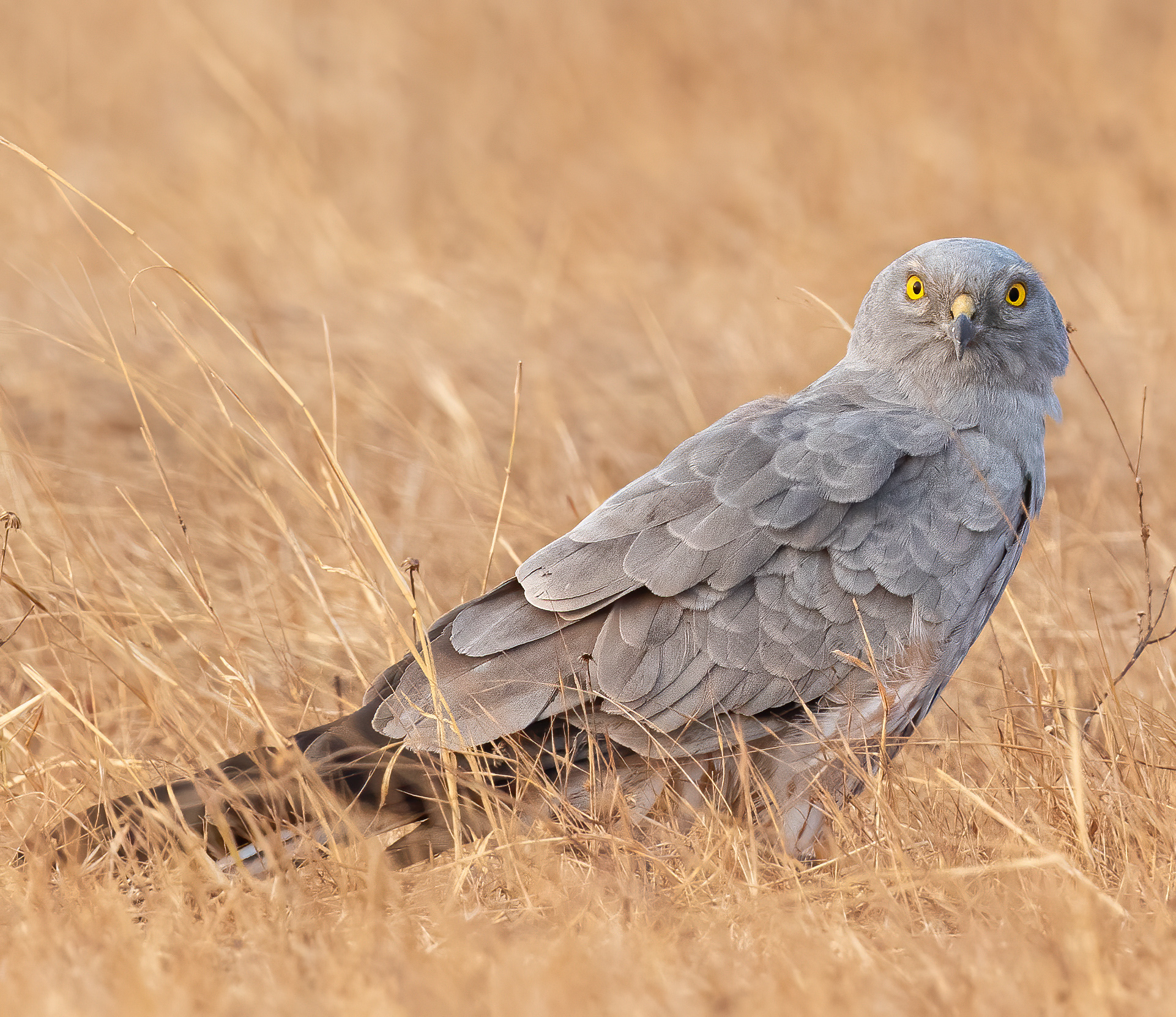
- Adult male
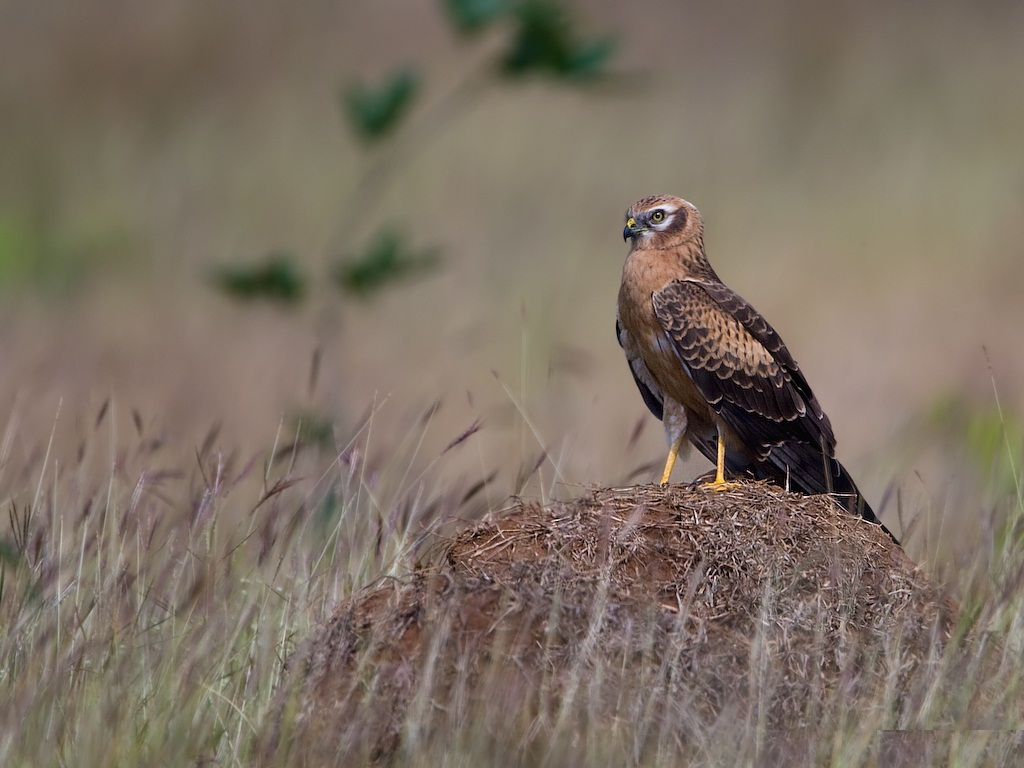
- Juvenile

Conservation status
- Least Concern (IUCN 3.1)

Scientific classification
- Kingdom: Animalia
- Phylum: Chordata
- Class: Aves
- Order: Accipitriformes
- Family: Accipitridae
- Genus: Circus
- Species: C. pygargus

Binomial name
- Circus pygargus (Linnaeus, 1758)
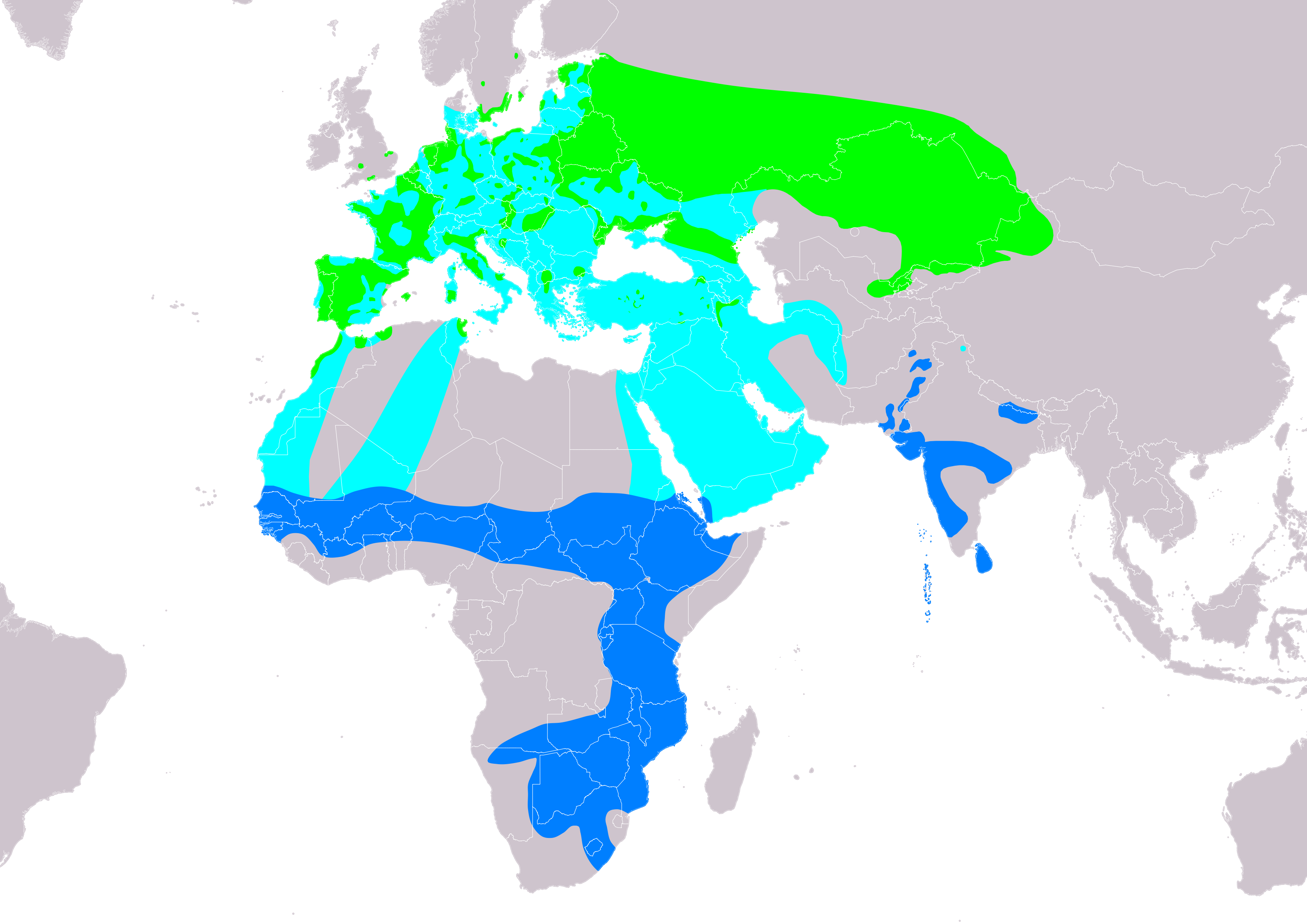
- Range of C. pygargus Breeding Passage Non-breeding

Synonyms
- Falco pygargus Linnaeus, 1758

= Montagu's harrier =

Species of bird

Montagu's harrier (Circus pygargus) is a species of harrier, a bird of prey in the family Accipitridae. It breeds in large open areas in the Palearctic and is migratory, wintering in Africa, the Indian subcontinent and parts of the Arabian Peninsula. Its common name commemorates the British naturalist George Montagu.

== Taxonomy ==
The first formal description of Montagu's harrier was by the Swedish naturalist Carl Linnaeus in 1758, in the tenth edition of his Systema Naturae, under the binomial name Falco pygargus. The genus Circus was introduced by the French naturalist Bernard Germain de Lacépède in 1799. The genus name is derived from Ancient Greek. Circus is from kirkos, meaning "circle", referring to a bird of prey named for its circling flight (probably the hen harrier), and pygargus is Modern Latin derived from the Greek pugargos, from puge, meaning "rump", and argos, meaning "shining white". The species name was formerly used for the hen harrier before Montagu's was identified as a different species.

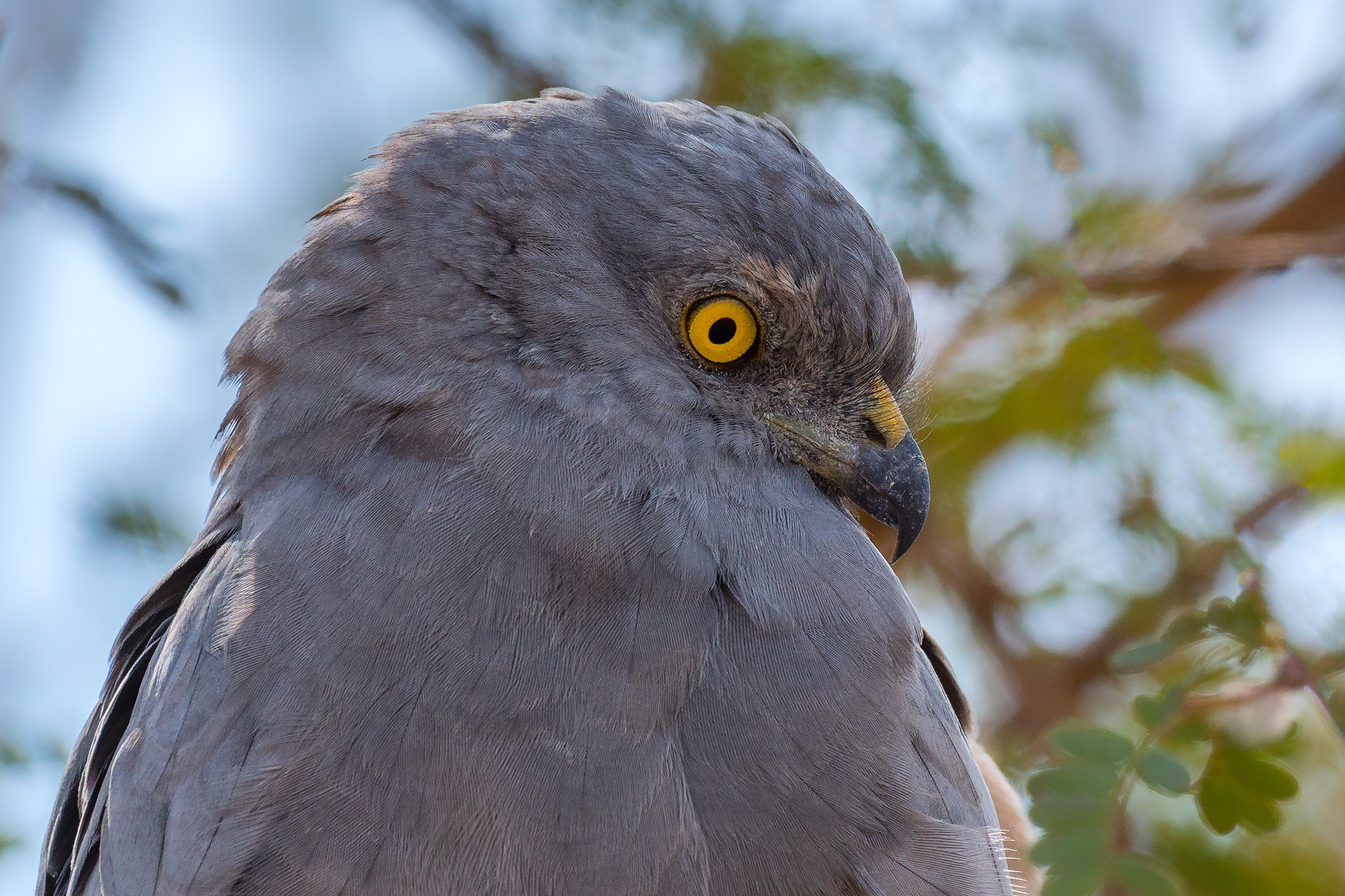
Montagu's harrier male, Rollapadu Wildlife Sanctuary, Andhra Pradesh, India

== Identification ==
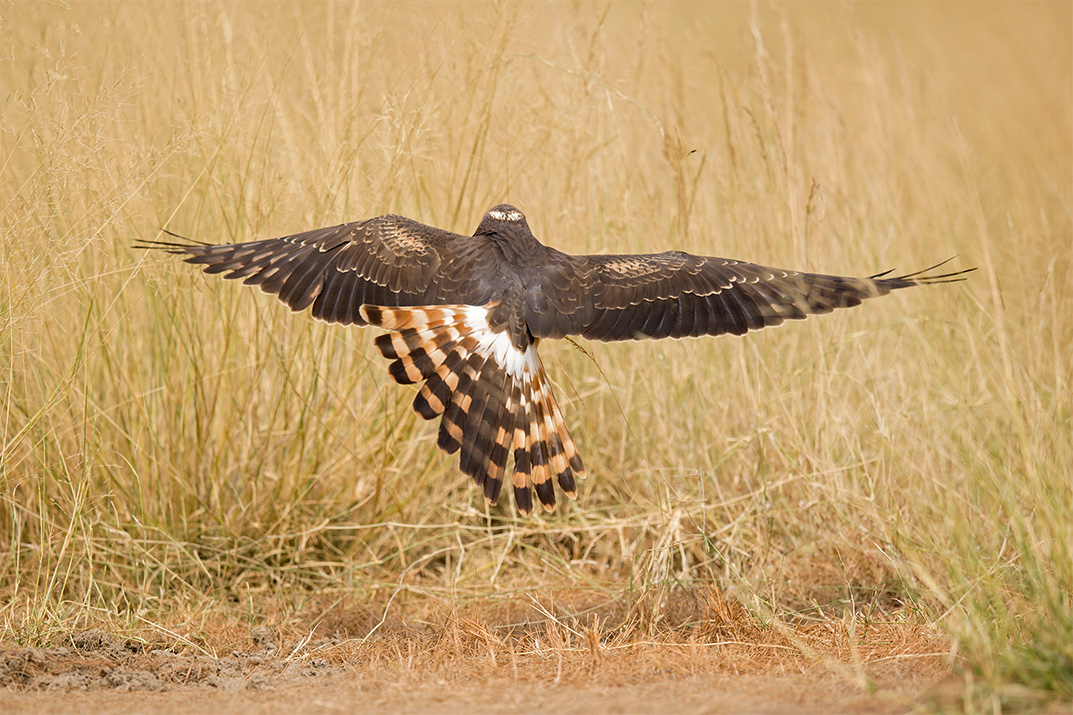
Montagu's harrier in flight, Tal Chhapar Sanctuary

=== Plumage ===
Sexual dimorphism is particularly apparent in the plumage of this species. Adult males are characterized by their overall pale grey plumage contrasting with black wingtips. Compared with other harriers this species has characteristic black bands along the secondaries, both above and below the wing and rusty streaks on belly and flanks. Adult females have a broadly similar plumage to that of pallid and hen harriers. The underparts are mostly pale yellow-brown, the belly with longitudinal stripes and the wing coverts spotted. The upper parts are uniform dark brown except for the white upper tail coverts ("rump"), and the sightly paler central wing coverts.

The juvenile plumage resembles that of the female, but differs by the belly and under wing coverts which are not spotted, but uniformly red brown in colour.

A melanistic form occurs regularly in this species. In this form the male is much darker than usual, with a black head, brownish black above and grey underparts. The melanistic female is entirely chocolate brown except for grey flight feathers. Partially melanistic morphs can also be found.

=== Flight ===
Montagu's harrier has a particularly smooth flight pattern, with powerful and elegant wingbeats which give an impression of buoyancy and ease. In true harrier fashion it searches the countryside, flying low, and generally holds its wings with a marked positive dihedral.

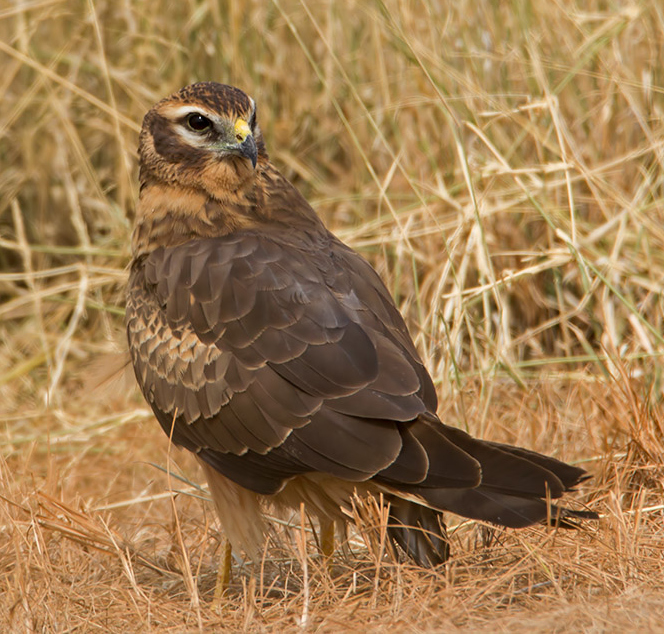
Juvenile, Tal Chhapar Sanctuary

=== Dimensions ===
Montagu's harrier is a deceptively small raptor, though it appears larger because of its large wing surface compared to small body weight, which gives it a typically buoyant flight. The female is larger than the male because the female needs to produce eggs, however this is not apparent in the field.

- Wingspan: 97–115 cm (38–45 in)
- Length: 43–47 cm (17–19 in) (tail: 16–18 cm (6.3–7.1 in))
- Weight (average):
  - Male: 265 g (9.3 oz)
  - Female: 345 g (12.2 oz)

=== Risk of confusion ===
Montagu's harrier can be confused with several species that exist within the same range. The most similar are the hen harrier and the pallid harrier. The male is easily distinguished from other species as its plumage is distinctly darker and more mottled than in the males of hen or pallid harriers. However, distinguishing females and juveniles is more difficult. Usually, Montagu's harrier appears more slender in flight than the hen harrier, with a longer tail, longer and narrower wings and more pointed "hands". Also its flight is more elegant than the hen harrier, with more elastic, almost tern-like wingbeats. The distinction between female pallid and Montagu's harriers is the most delicate and can only be made in good conditions as the proportions are similar. The best recognition character is the pale collar around the neck of female and juvenile pallid harriers which is not present in Montagu's.

== Habitat ==
This species can be found in a middle-latitude band of predominantly temperate climates, but also in Mediterranean, and boreal zones. Although it has been found nesting up to 1,500 m (4,900 ft), it is essentially a lowland species, and nests mostly in broad river valleys, plains, and levels bordering lakes and the sea. It can breed in wetlands, though these are often smaller and drier than those used by the marsh harrier. It also utilizes heaths, dunes, moors, and can be found in the steppe. It adapts to shrublands in gorse or heather and to areas planted with young conifers.

When no other suitable habitat is available this harrier will nest in agricultural farmlands where it is vulnerable to early harvesting. Amongst these it chooses especially grasslands and cereal crops such as wheat, barley, oats and colza. In western Europe, up to 70% of the population breeds in artificial habitats.

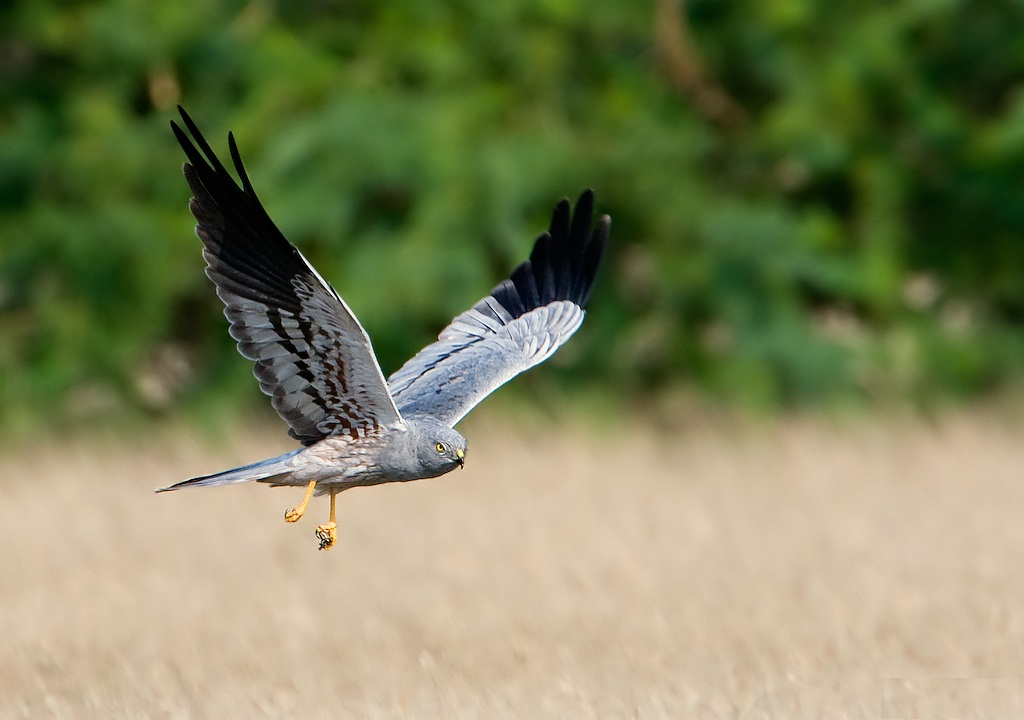
Adult male

In short, Montagu's harrier requires a large open area for breeding, with sufficiently tall ground vegetation to afford cover without being overgrown. It favours posts on which both male and female can rest and survey the breeding area: these can be fenceposts, small trees, or rocky outcrops. When hunting, in any season, it prefers areas of low or sparse vegetation where prey is more visible. Densely settled areas are generally avoided and it is highly susceptible to disturbance.

== Food and foraging methods ==
The diet consists mainly of small rodents, small birds, bird eggs, reptiles (including snakes) and large insects (mainly Orthoptera, which are numerically the most common).

As this bird has a wide distribution, it will take whatever prey is available in the area where it nests; in the northern range it will mainly take ground squirrels and rabbits, whereas in southern Europe, it mostly takes small reptiles and large insects. In areas where the food supply is composed almost exclusively of rodents, the breeding success depends greatly on the cyclic fluctuations of vole populations. At times they regurgitate.

Prey is caught while flying along fixed routes at low heights and constant low speeds (c. 30 km/h (19 mph)), as is typical of harriers. The flight is considered lighter and more dexterous than other harriers enabling it to take more agile prey. When possible it often follows the edges of various vegetation to catch its prey by surprise. This is taken after a short stoop, though fast running animals and flying birds can be chased over a short distance.

During the breeding season, the male will provision the female and later the young with food. The rate of provisioning increases from 5 to 6 times per day during incubation to 7 to 10 times per day when young have hatched, though the male can be handicapped by wet, foggy or windy weather. In a manner typical of harriers, prey is passed between partners in the air: The female flies underneath the male, who drops the prey for her to catch. The male hunts over a large area up to 12 km (7.5 mi) away from the nest. The female hunts closer to the nest, up to 1 km (0.62 mi) away, and only after the young have hatched.

== Status and distribution ==
This species can still be found throughout most of the Western Palaearctic. In most European countries there is at least a small population, except in Norway where it is not present. The breeding range extends as far east as the Urals, whereas the most western population is that of Portugal. Breeding also occurs in northern Africa, mostly in Morocco. In Great Britain, the species is limited to southern England. In Ireland the species is rarely seen, and mainly in the South, although there are a number of breeding records, the most recent from 1971. Despite having a wide distribution, this bird is not common in many areas and has strong populations only in France, Spain, Russia, Belarus and Poland where the greater part of the European population can be found. Breeding sites frequently change, with some sporadic nesting occurring outside known breeding areas, however, clear signs of reduced range are apparent and are associated with population decline.

=== Status in Britain ===
Montagu's harrier is a rare breeding bird in Britain. There are two breeding areas: the area surrounding The Wash, and downland areas of southern England, from Dorset and Hampshire north to Oxfordshire. Away from these areas it occurs only as a scarce migrant. One site, Estuary Farm, near North Wootton in west Norfolk, a special observation area was negotiated with local landowners, so that pressure could be taken off other nesting pairs. In 2005, a pair bred on the Holkham estate. In 2015, it was reported that some Montagu's harrier were nesting at Blacktoft Sands, East Riding of Yorkshire.

== Population trends ==
The population for the western Palearctic is estimated at 35,000–50,000 pairs. The global population is unknown and could be anything between 150,000 and 200,000 individuals(Birdlife International, 2004). This uncertainty is due to the fact that most of the world's population is situated in Russia and former Soviet republics where it is not quantified.

The evolution has been paradoxical throughout the 20th century. In the beginning of the century up to the 1940s, during a period when other raptors greatly decreased because of human persecution, Montagu's harrier actually increased its population and breeding range, breeding for the first time in Denmark in the 1900s, and greatly increasing elsewhere. However, from the 1940s onwards it has decreased rapidly. This is due to several negative factors: first, the massive use of agricultural pesticides such as DDT and other environmental poisons was extremely detrimental to the harriers themselves, as well as rarefying their prey, in particular large insects. The modification of agricultural practices, with an evolution towards more intensive farming also puts pressure on harriers, with faster growing crops preventing those birds that nest in farmlands from finishing their nidification before their clutches are destroyed by harvesting machines. Despite a generally negative trend there are local cases when the population has increased, such as in Sweden or in Germany in the 1990s. These local trends show that while they have access to suitable habitats and food supply there can still be positive developments.

== Social behaviour and breeding ==
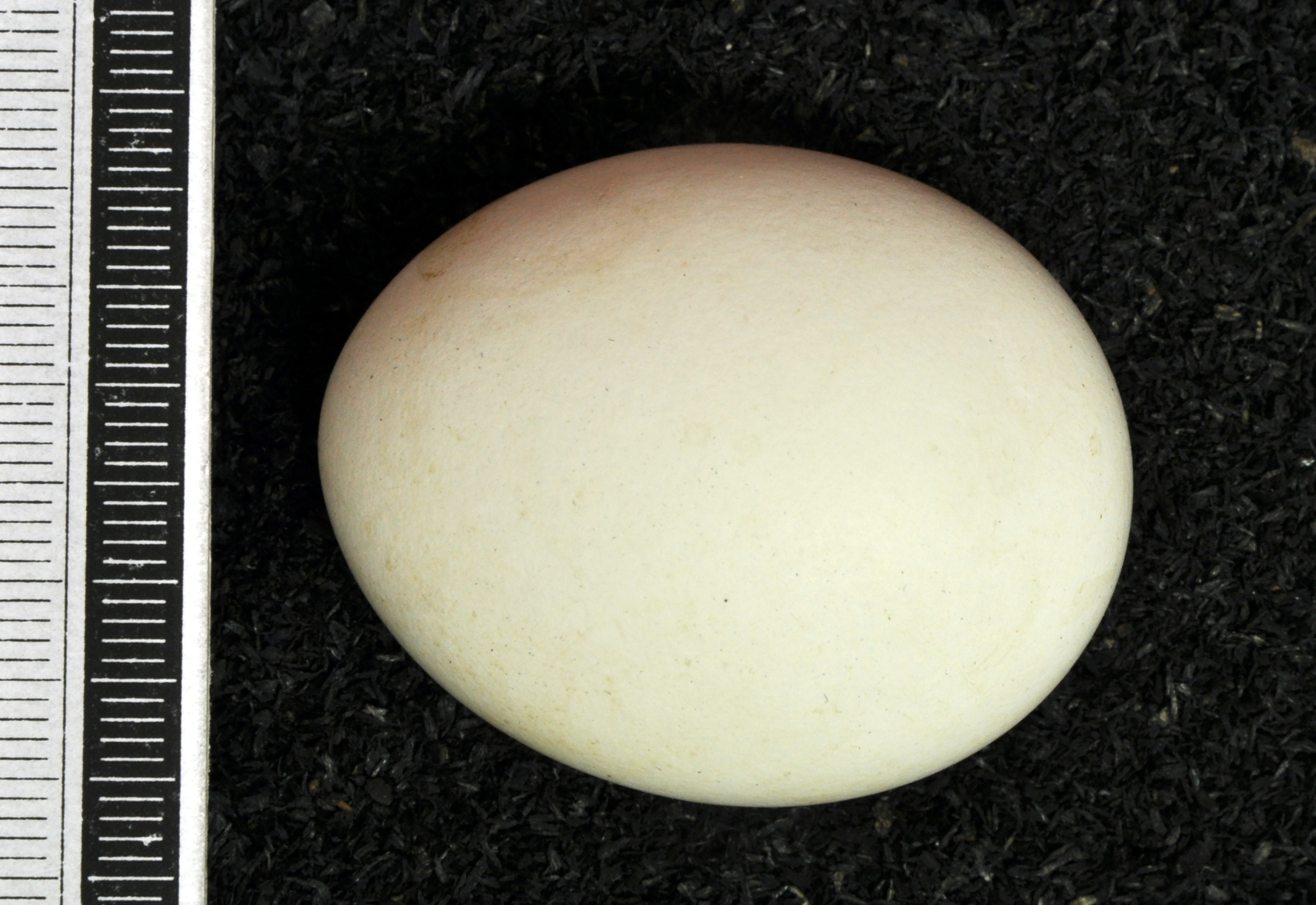
Egg, Collection Museum Wiesbaden

It can be both solitary and gregarious at times, both during the breeding season and in winter quarters. A breeding pair may associate with others to form loose colonies, with as many as 30 nests in the same area, sometimes as close as 10 m (33 ft) apart. Semi-colonial nesting is not due to a shortage of nesting sites, but arises rather from the need to provide a better defense against predators. The actual area defended by both partners covers only 300–400 m (980–1,310 ft) around the nest, and in case of colonial nesting the response to predators may be communal. Other species attacked and mobbed include large raptors, corvids, and foxes.

Reproduction begins with the return of both partners to the nesting site, at which point both male and female will start displaying. The display consists of various sky-dances and aerobatic figures that vary according to each individual. Both sexes will display, crying loudly, though the males' displays are more frequent and spectacular. Montagu's harriers breed for the first time when two or three years old, but occasionally one-year-old females may attempt to nest. Pairs form on the territory, when returning from migration. As the birds are tied to their former nesting sites, they probably mate with the same partner every year. The nest is built by the female, always in tall vegetation. It is a simple construction made of grass, used only for one season. The female lays 3 to 5 eggs which are incubated for 27–40 days. The young leave the nest after 28–42 days and are independent two weeks later.

The males may be polygamous, then having to feed two females and later two broods, either simultaneously or consecutively.

== Migration ==
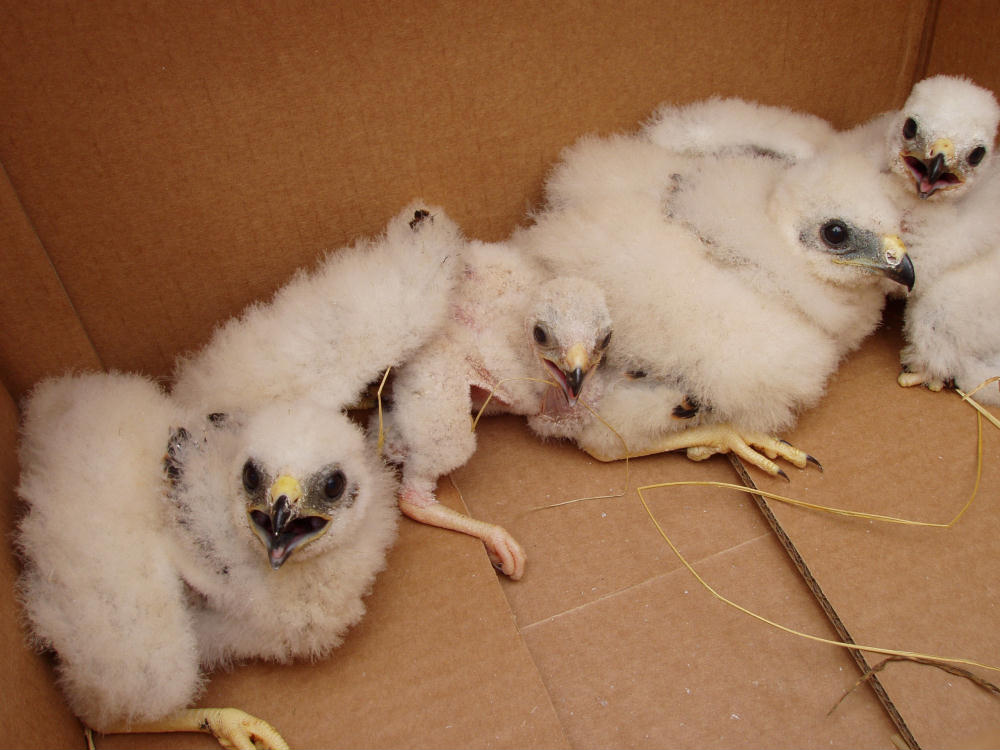
Young Montagu's harriers during relocation.

Montagu's harrier is a long distance migrant. Birds from Eurasia spend the winter in sub-Saharan Africa, while those from the eastern part of the range migrate to the Indian subcontinent. In Europe, the first birds start to move at the beginning of August and most have left by mid-October. They travel over a broad front, crossing the Mediterranean at various points, and only a small number are observed at migration choke points. Western birds do not go further south than the Gulf of Guinea, but some eastern birds travel as far as South Africa. In Africa, their diet is composed mostly of insects and birds, and it is possible that they follow locust swarms. Spring return peaks in April, and most birds have arrived by May though there is evidence that first-year juveniles spend their first summer in the winter quarters

== Conservation issues ==
In western Europe, an estimated 70% of breeding pairs nest in agricultural farmlands, especially cereal crops. This makes Montagu's harrier a very vulnerable species, and very dependent on nest protection. Bird protection non-governmental organizations participate in their protection, in collaboration with concerned landowners. Once a nest is spotted in a field, it can be safeguarded either by relocating it to a safer area or by creating a protected space which will not be harvested. In France and in the Iberian Peninsula, an average 60% of nestlings are saved by these kinds of measures.
