= Set point =

Set point or setpoint may refer to:

- Set point (tennis), a tennis term meaning one player is one point away from winning a set
- Set point (endocrinology), a term encompassing a number of quantities (e.g. body weight, body temperature) where the endocrine system contributes to regulation and homeostasis.
- Setpoint (control system), the target value that an automatic control system, for example PID controller, will aim to reach
- Set point theory, a theory describing how the body maintains a consistent weight over time
- Set Point (album), the fourth studio album by Yolka
- Set Point (film), 2004 Estonian film
