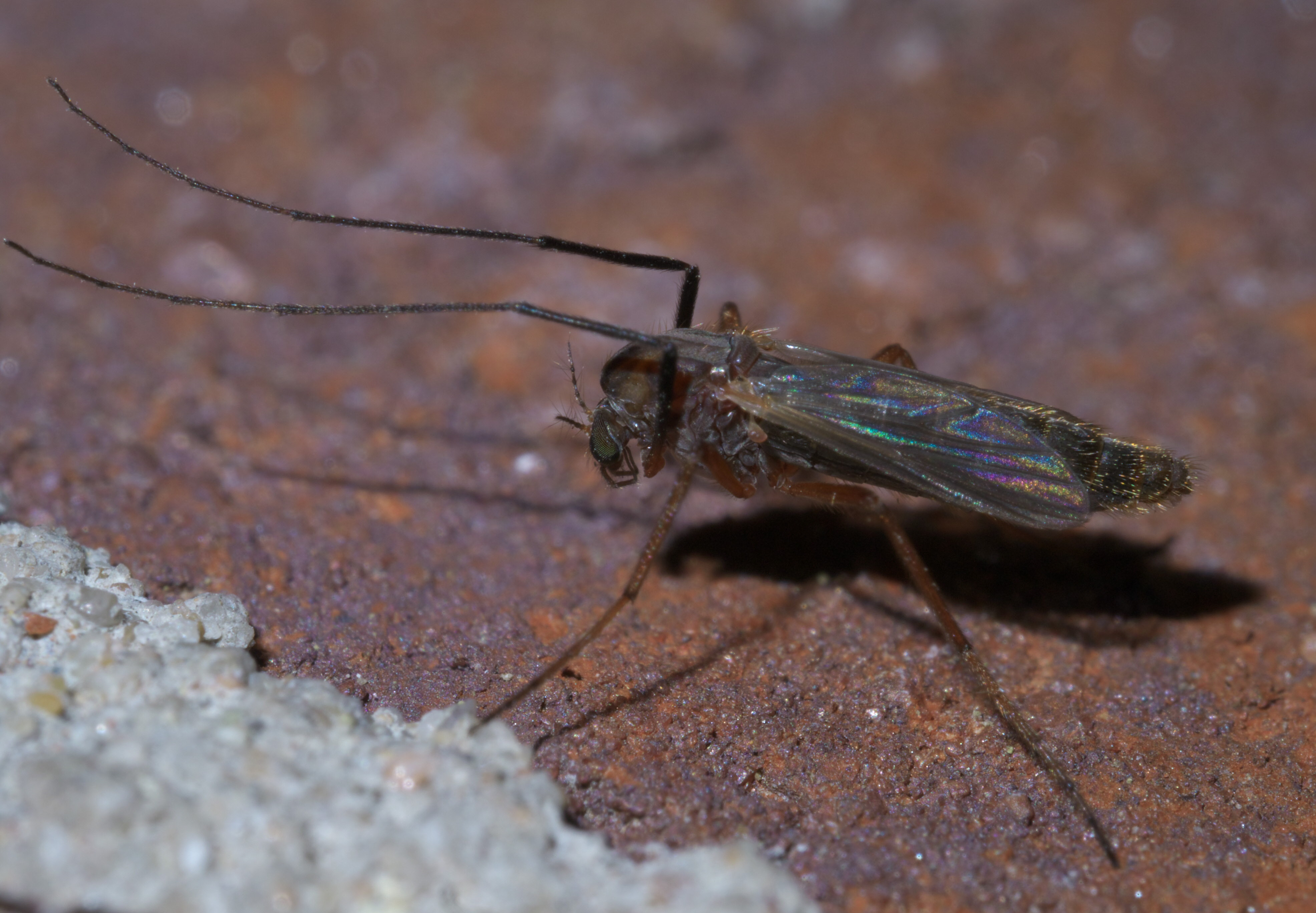

Scientific classification
- Domain: Eukaryota
- Kingdom: Animalia
- Phylum: Arthropoda
- Class: Insecta
- Order: Diptera
- Family: Chironomidae
- Tribe: Chironomini
- Genus: Glyptotendipes
- Species: G. testaceus

Binomial name
- Glyptotendipes testaceus (Townes, 1945)

Synonyms
- Glytotendipes testaceus Townes, 1945

= Glyptotendipes testaceus =

Species of fly

Glyptotendipes testaceus is a species of midge in the family Chironomidae.

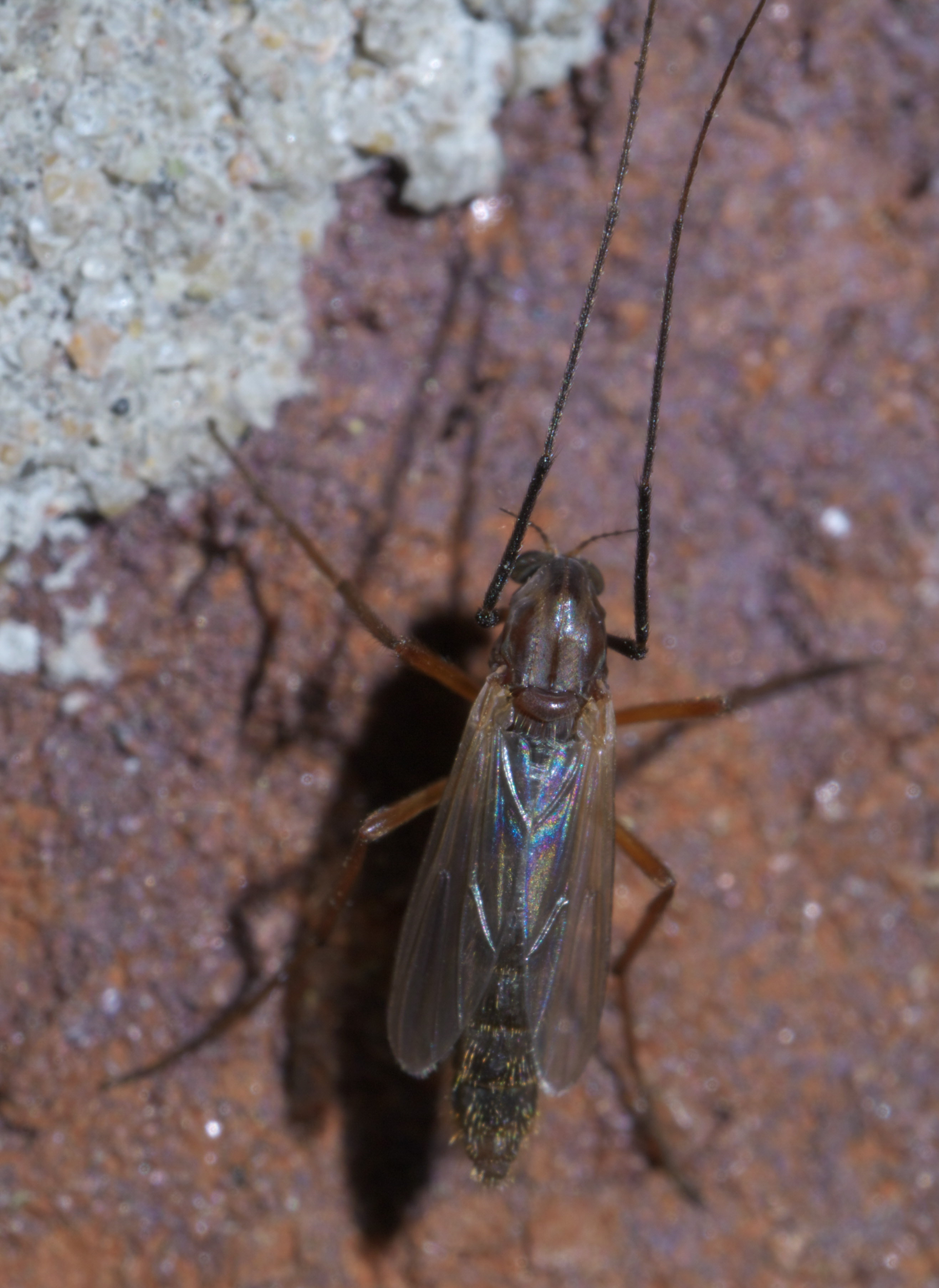
