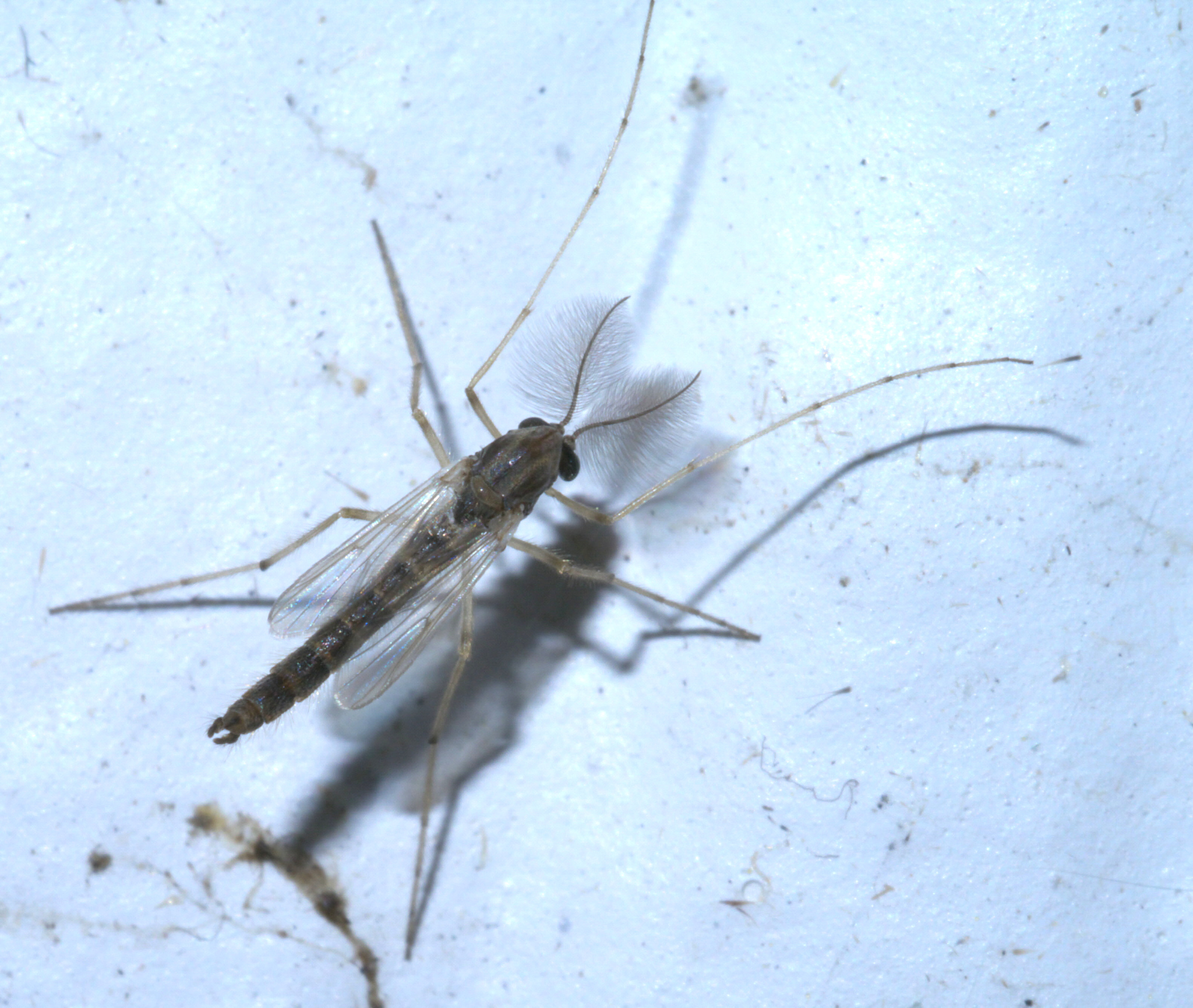
- Glyptotendipes meridionalis, Oklahoma

Scientific classification
- Kingdom: Animalia
- Phylum: Arthropoda
- Clade: Pancrustacea
- Class: Insecta
- Order: Diptera
- Family: Chironomidae
- Genus: Glyptotendipes
- Species: G. meridionalis

Binomial name
- Glyptotendipes meridionalis Dendy & Sublette, 1959

= Glyptotendipes meridionalis =

Species of fly

Glyptotendipes meridionalis is a species of non-biting midge in the genus Glyptotendipes found in Oklahoma and Texas.
