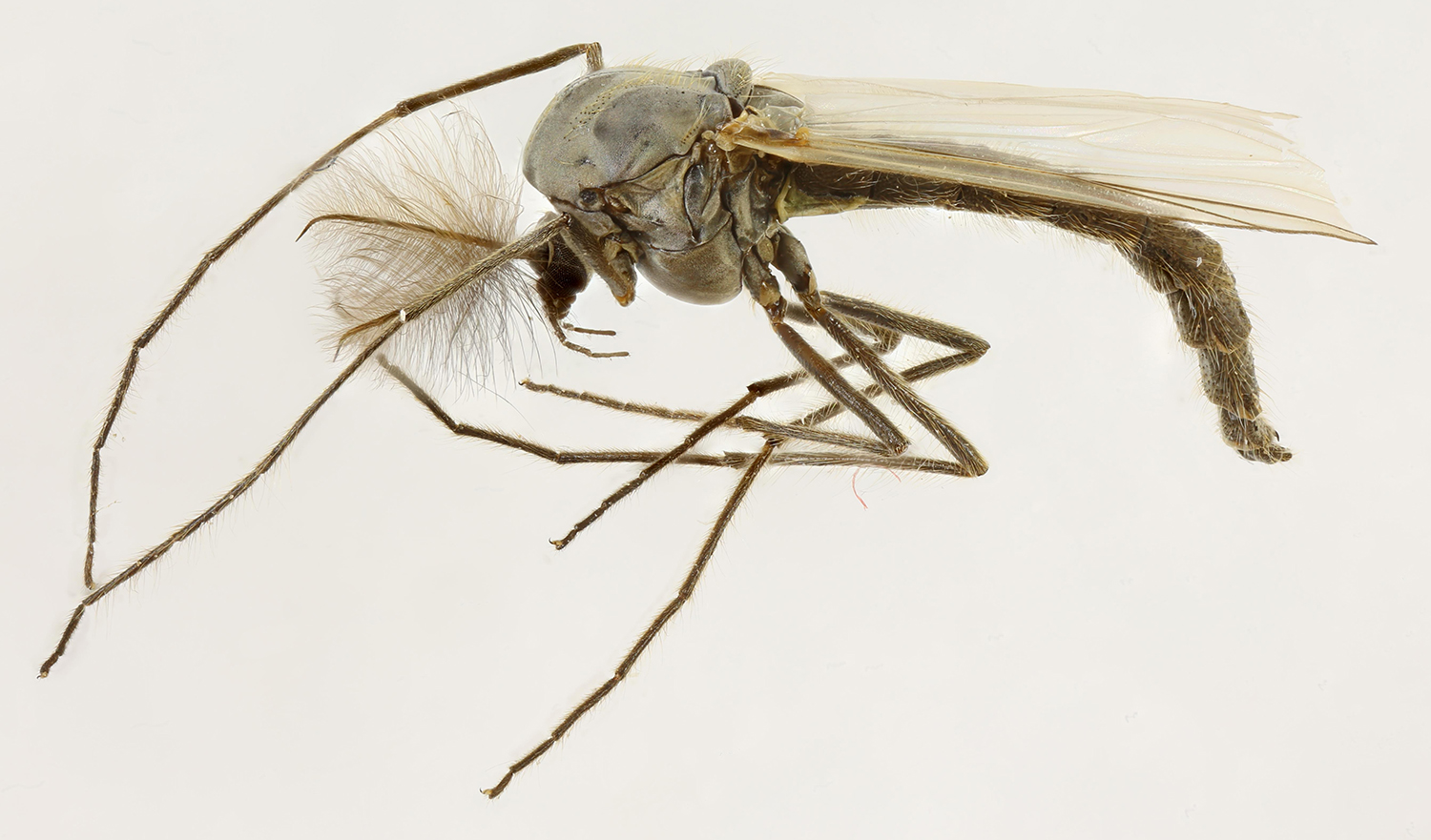
- Glyptotendipes pallens North Wales

Scientific classification
- Kingdom: Animalia
- Phylum: Arthropoda
- Class: Insecta
- Order: Diptera
- Family: Chironomidae
- Genus: Glyptotendipes
- Species: G. pallens

Binomial name
- Glyptotendipes pallens (Meigen, 1804)

= Glyptotendipes pallens =

Species of fly

Glyptotendipes pallens is a species of fly in the family Chironomidae. It is found in the Palearctic.
