= Glyptotendipes paripes =

Scientific classification
- Domain: Eukaryota
- Kingdom: Animalia
- Phylum: Arthropoda
- Class: Insecta
- Order: Diptera
- Family: Chironomidae
- Tribe: Chironomini
- Genus: Glyptotendipes
- Species: G. paripes

Binomial name
- Glyptotendipes paripes (Edwards, 1929)

Synonyms
- Chironomus paripes Edwards, 1929

Species of fly

Glyptotendipes paripes is a species of midge in the family Chironomidae. It is found in Europe.

== Subspecies ==
These three subspecies belong to the species Glyptotendipes paripes:

- Glyptotendipes paripes albobulatus Kruseman, 1933
- Glyptotendipes paripes flavipes Kruseman, 1933
- Glyptotendipes paripes paripes
