= James Broselow =

American physician and entrepreneur (1943-2025)

- Born: January 12, 1943; Woodbury, New Jersey
- Died: February 20, 2025 (aged 82)
- Occupations: Physician and Entrepreneur

James Broselow (January 12, 1943 – February 20, 2025) was an American emergency physician, an assistant professor, an inventor and an entrepreneur. He and fellow emergency physician Robert Luten are best known in the medical community for inventing the Broselow tape in 1985, which was the first tool developed relating a pediatric patient's height to their weight in order to “determine the size of equipment, supplies, and dosages of medication to use…” during emergencies. The first commercial Broselow tape was created in 1988 and later versions were updated with newer growth chart data. The Broselow Tape is featured in many medical textbooks and reference manuals as the standard for length-based weight measures. Nearly 40 years later after its inception, the Broselow Tape remains a cornerstone in pediatric emergency care worldwide, with Broselow hailed as the "rock star" of pediatric medicine. It continues to save lives throughout the globe.

Additionally, Broselow served as the chief medical officer of eBroselow, LLC, a company he co-founded in 2009 that developed the Artemis solution, an electronic and digital drug dosing and tracking system and medical device for emergency medical services and emergency rooms now marketed under the name of Safe Dose. He was also a clinical associate professor of emergency medicine in the Department of Emergency Medicine at the University of Florida College of Medicine – Jacksonville, where he explored new approaches to pediatric emergency medicine.

== Early years ==
Broselow was born in Woodbury, New Jersey, to family practice doctor Benjamin and jazz vocalist Charlotte Dubin Broselow of Jan Savitt fame. He grew up in the Franklinville section of Franklin Township, Gloucester County, New Jersey, and graduated from Delsea Regional High School in 1961. He obtained his undergraduate degree in economics from Dartmouth College in 1965 and his medical degree from the New Jersey College of Medicine and Dentistry in 1969.

== Medical career ==
After graduating from medical school, Broselow became board certified as a family physician and entered private practice in Frankenmuth, Michigan, United States. Through his work in private practice he became interested in emergency medicine and in 1980, moved to North Carolina where he practiced emergency medicine in three community hospitals: Lincoln County Hospital, Cleveland Memorial, and Catawba Valley Medical Center. He retired from clinical practice in 2006.

== Inventions and entrepreneurial work ==
Broselow held numerous patents related to safe emergency treatment of children. He started several businesses including Broselow Medical Technologies, LLC in the 1990s, and eBroselow, LLC. He most recently had partnered with local investors to bring further new ideas to fruition. At the time of his death, he was working in close conjunction with the Duke University Medical Center to launch an innovative communication-based technology for the transition of patient care in emergency situations.

== Personal ==
Broselow lived for nearly 50 years in Hickory, North Carolina, with his wife Millie. He was fond of dogs and especially of his cat, Pipin. He loved playing golf and going to dinner with friends. He has one daughter, Sabrina Broselow Moser, who holds a Ph.D in Germanic Languages from UNC at Chapel Hill and who currently lives in the German city Backnang with her two sons, Leopold Moser and Wolfgang James Moser and her husband Marc Moser
