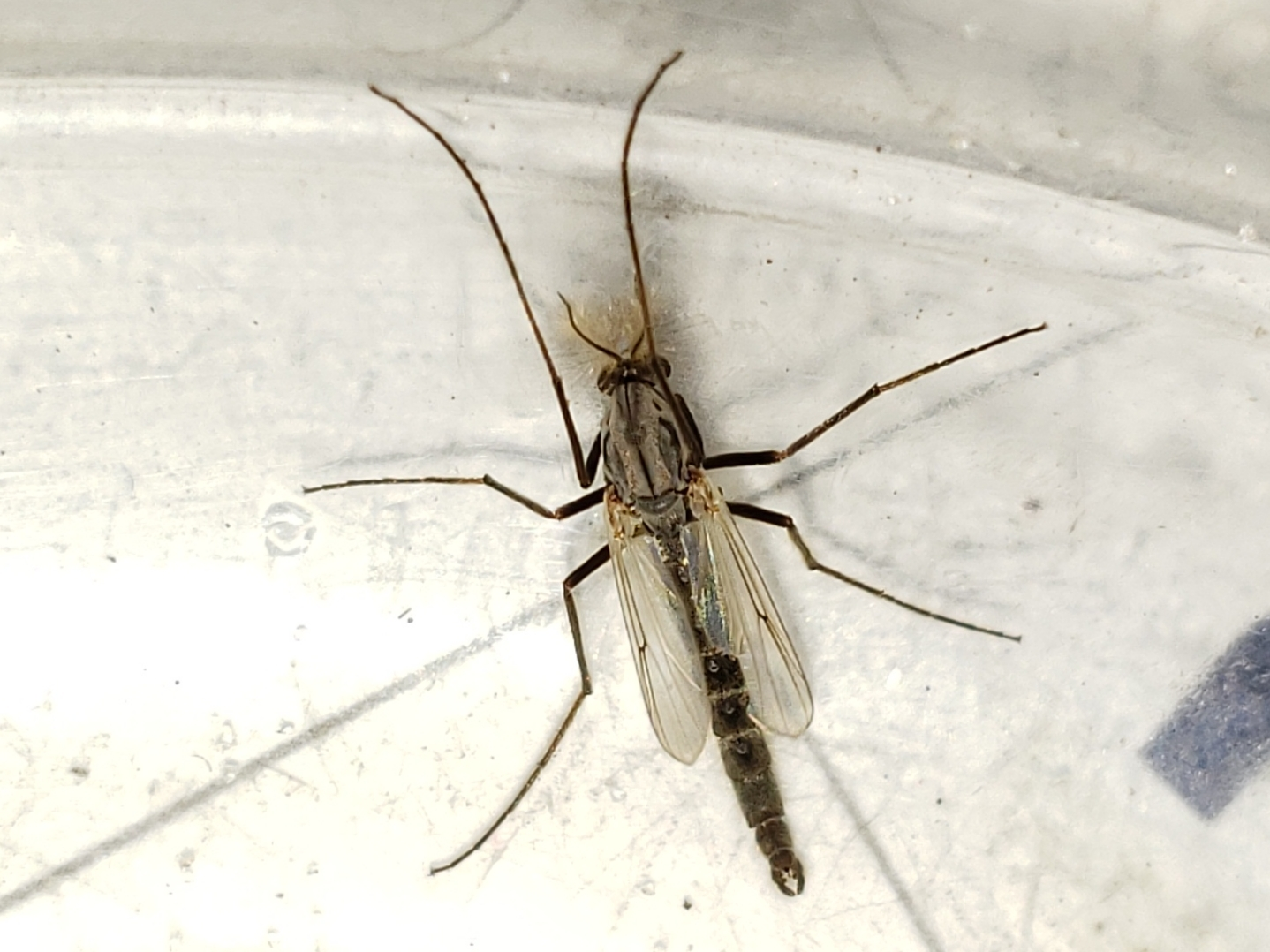
- Glyptotendipes paripes, Florida

Scientific classification
- Kingdom: Animalia
- Phylum: Arthropoda
- Clade: Pancrustacea
- Class: Insecta
- Order: Diptera
- Family: Chironomidae
- Subfamily: Chironominae
- Tribe: Chironomini
- Genus: Glyptotendipes; Kieffer, 1913

Subgenera
- Glyptotendipes Kieffer, 1913; Phytotendipes Goetghebuer, 1937

Synonyms
- Caulochironomus Heyn, 1993; Heynotendipes Spies & Sæther, 2004; Phytotendipes Goetghebuer, 1937; Trichotendipes Heyn, 1993

= Glyptotendipes =

Genus of non-biting midges

Glyptotendipes is a genus of non-biting midges in the family Chironomidae. There are more than 60 described species in Glyptotendipes.

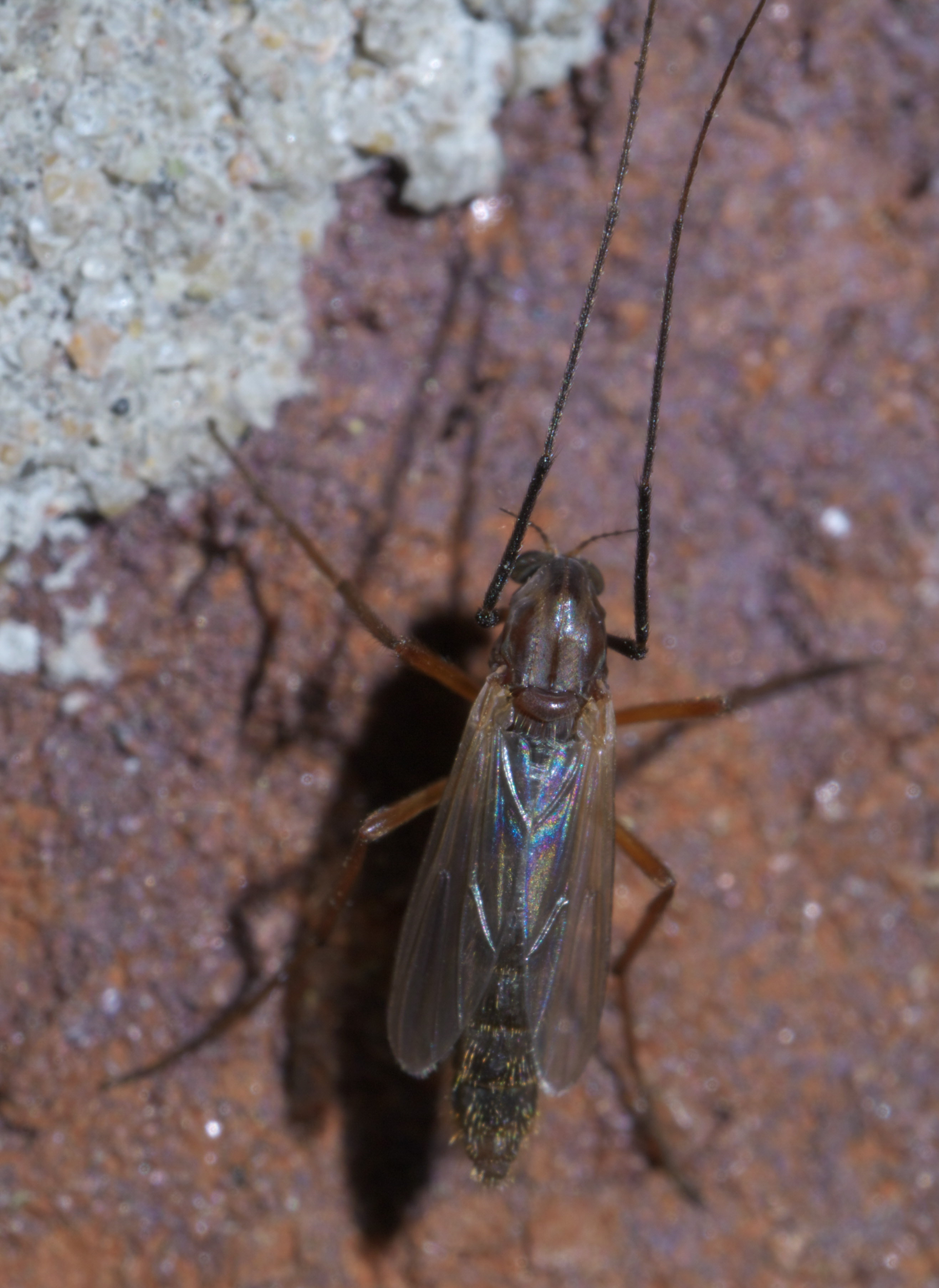
Glyptotendipes testaceus

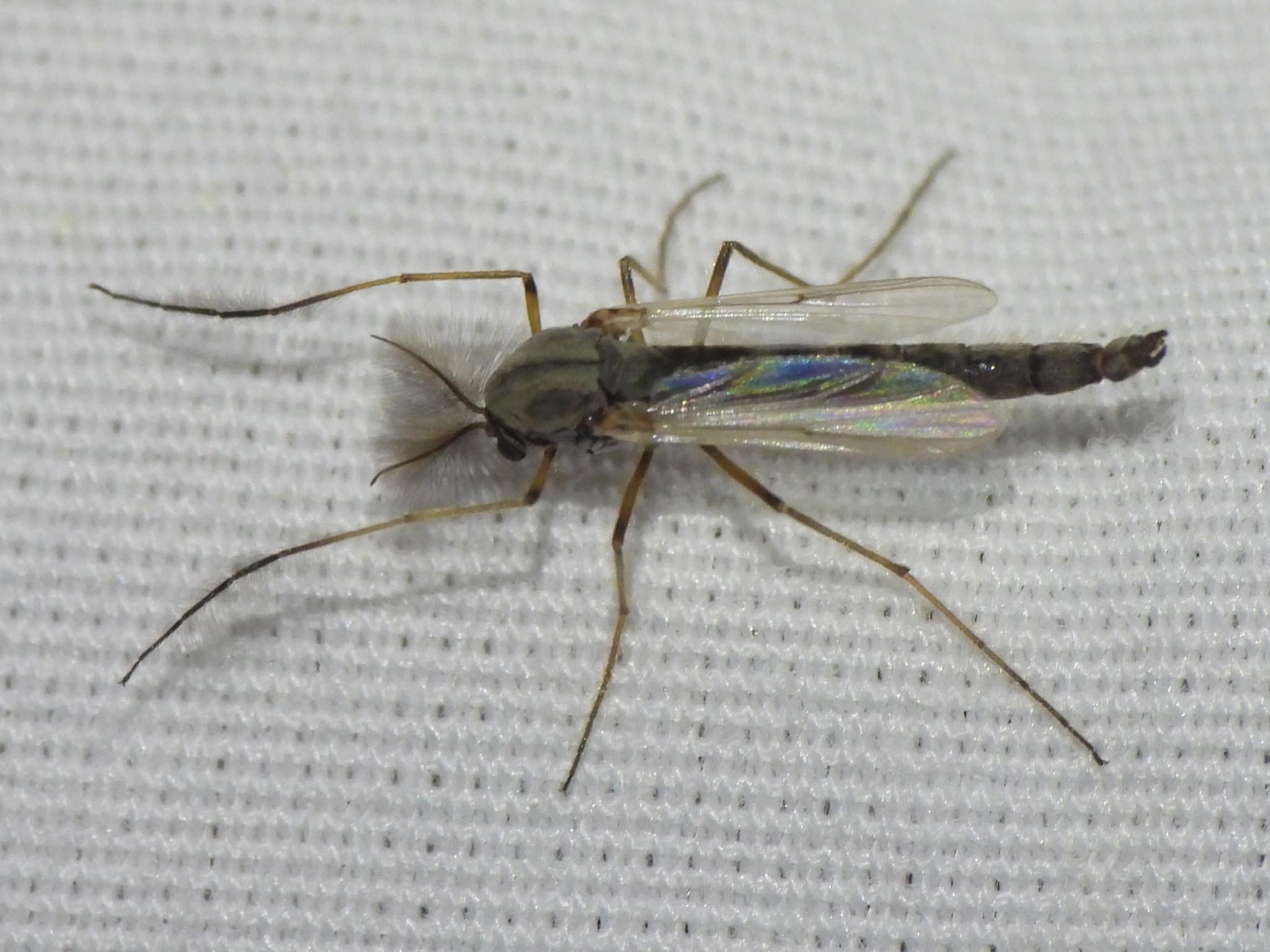
Glyptotendipes barbipes, Texas

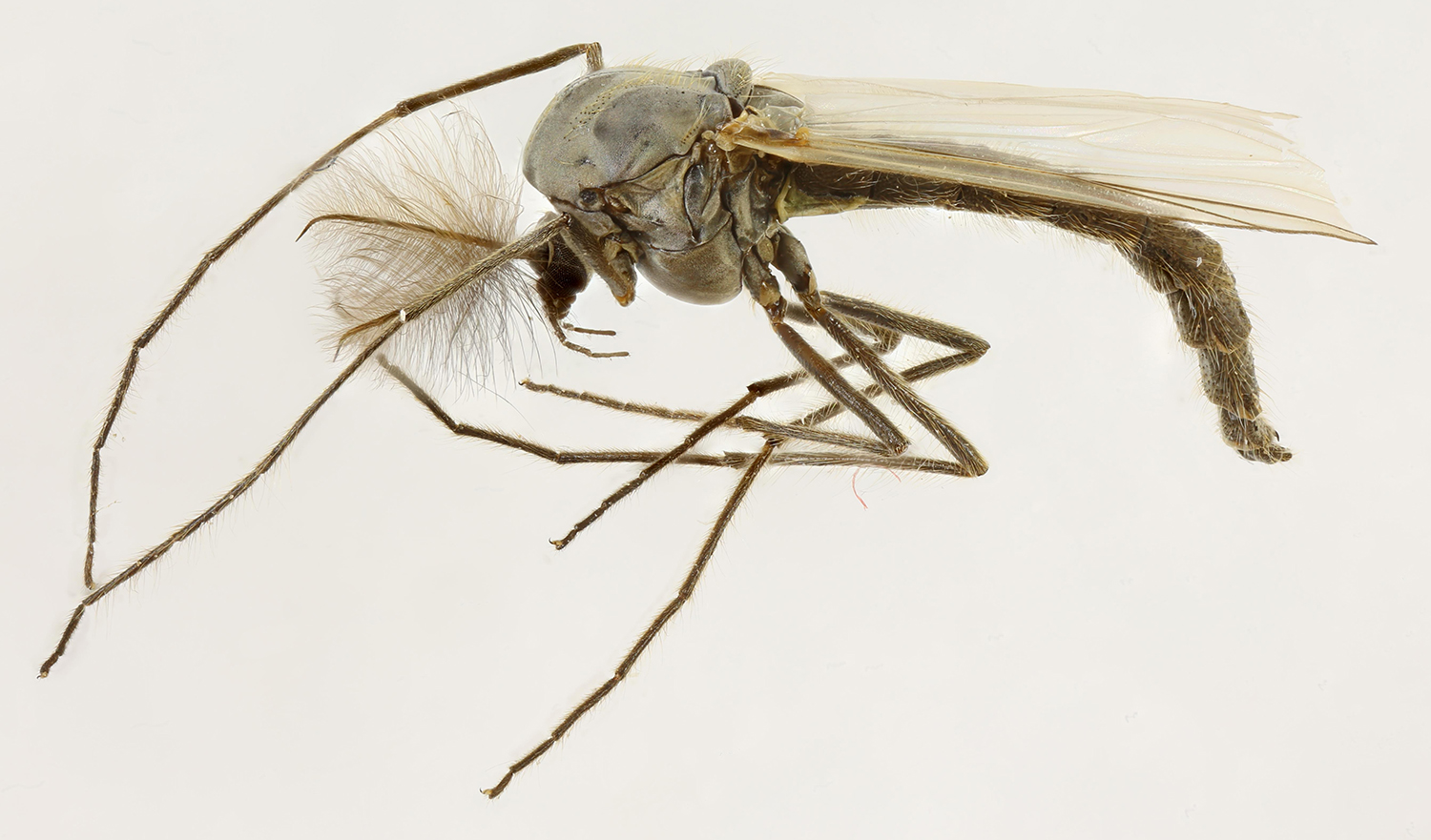
Glyptotendipes pallens, North Wales

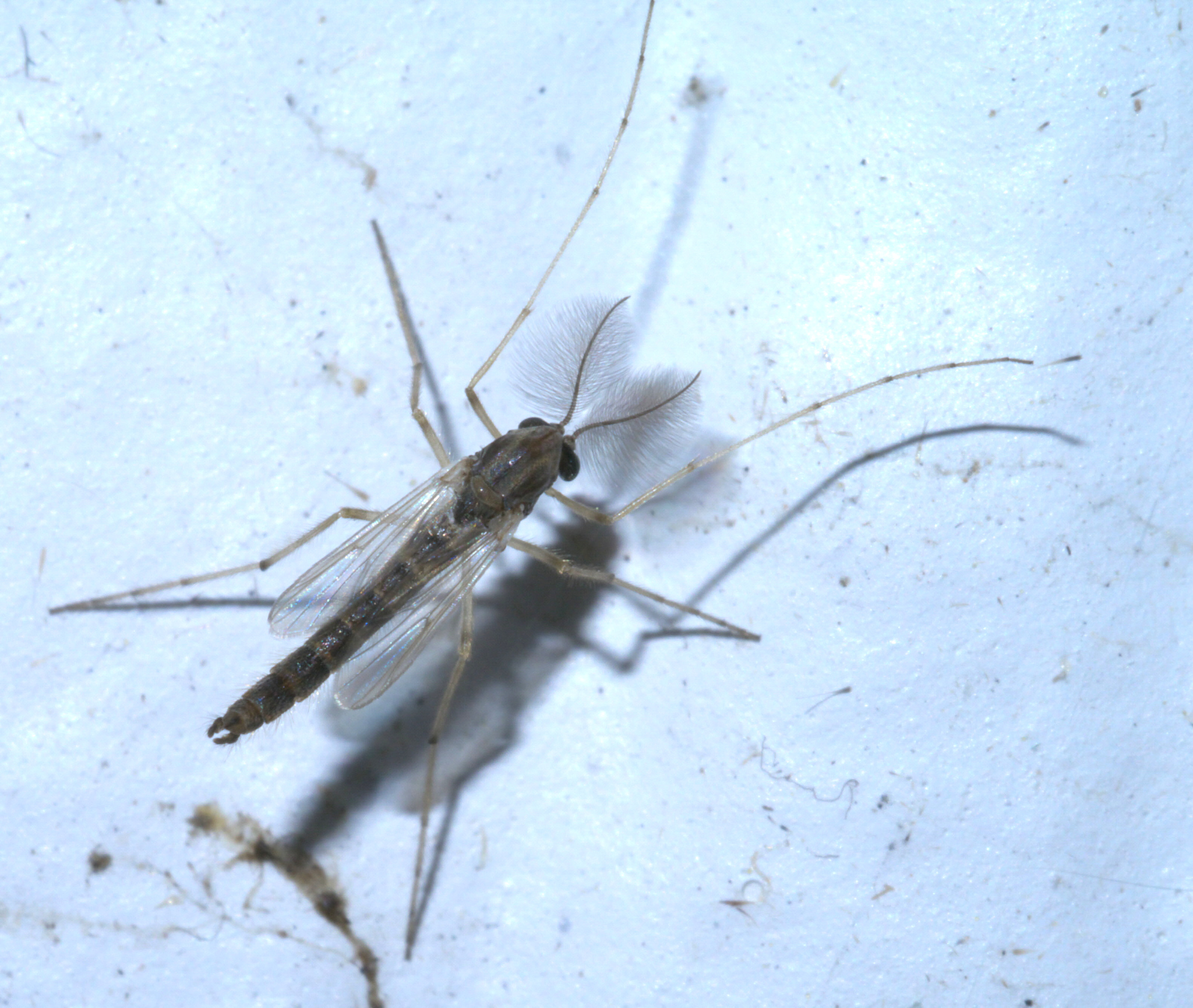
Glyptotendipes meridionalis, Oklahoma

== Species ==
These 64 species belong to the genus Glyptotendipes:

- Glyptotendipes aequalis (Kieffer, 1922)
- Glyptotendipes amplus Townes, 1945
- Glyptotendipes annulaimanus (Goetghebuer, 1921)
- Glyptotendipes anomalus (Kieffer, 1924)
- Glyptotendipes barbipes (Staeger, 1839)
- Glyptotendipes bicoloratus Goetghebuer, 1939
- Glyptotendipes biwasecundus Sasa & Kawai, 1987
- Glyptotendipes brevilobus (Kieffer, 1916)
- Glyptotendipes candidus (Kieffer, 1913)
- Glyptotendipes caulicola (Kieffer, 1913)
- Glyptotendipes corticicola (Kieffer, 1913)
- Glyptotendipes dendrophila Zvereva, 1950
- Glyptotendipes discolor Kieffer, 1926
- Glyptotendipes dreisbachi Townes, 1945
- Glyptotendipes flavimanus (Meigen, 1830)
- Glyptotendipes fodiens (Kieffer, 1924)
- Glyptotendipes foliicola Kieffer, 1918
- Glyptotendipes formosae Kieffer, 1922
- Glyptotendipes fujisecundus (Sasa, 1985)
- Glyptotendipes fulvofasciatus Kieffer, 1921
- Glyptotendipes fumilatus Majumdar & Mazumdar, 2011
- Glyptotendipes glaucus (Meigen, 1818)
- Glyptotendipes gripekoveni (Kieffer, 1913)
- Glyptotendipes harpagatus Pal & Hazra, 2018
- Glyptotendipes hebetare Konar & Majumdar, 2020
- Glyptotendipes imbecilis (Walker, 1856)
- Glyptotendipes imicola (Kieffer, 1926)
- Glyptotendipes inflatum Konar & Majumdar, 2020
- Glyptotendipes ingenius Majumdar & Mazumdar, 2011
- Glyptotendipes latifrons (Kieffer, 1924)
- Glyptotendipes leucoceras (Kieffer, 1913)
- Glyptotendipes lipinae Olivari, 1955
- Glyptotendipes lobiferus (Say, 1823)
- Glyptotendipes mancunianus (Edwards, 1929)
- Glyptotendipes melanosema (Kieffer, 1911)
- Glyptotendipes melanostolus (Kieffer, 1911)
- Glyptotendipes meridionalis Dendy & Sublette, 1959
- Glyptotendipes nishidai Yamamoto, 1995
- Glyptotendipes ospeli Contreras-Lichtenberg & Kiknadze, 2000
- Glyptotendipes pallen Meigen, 1804
- Glyptotendipes pallens (Meigen, 1804)
- Glyptotendipes paratestaceus Saether, 2011
- Glyptotendipes paripes (Edwards, 1929)
- Glyptotendipes paulisensus Saether, 2011
- Glyptotendipes philippinarum (Kieffer, 1921)
- Glyptotendipes pilosus Dutta & Chaudhuri, 1995
- Glyptotendipes polytomus
- Glyptotendipes salinus Mikhailova, 1987
- Glyptotendipes scirpi (Edwards, 1929)
- Glyptotendipes seminole Townes, 1945
- Glyptotendipes senilis (Johannsen, 1937)
- Glyptotendipes sensilis Saether, 2011
- Glyptotendipes severini (Goetghebuer, 1923)
- Glyptotendipes sigillatus Kieffer, 1913
- Glyptotendipes signatus (Kieffer, 1909)
- Glyptotendipes sparganii (Kieffer, 1908)
- Glyptotendipes testaceus Townes, 1945
- Glyptotendipes tokunagai Sasa, 1979
- Glyptotendipes unacus Townes, 1945
- Glyptotendipes uralicus Martynova, 1969
- Glyptotendipes validens Majumdar & Mazumdar, 2011
- Glyptotendipes varipes (Goetghebuer, 1927)
- Glyptotendipes verrucosus (Kieffer, 1911)
- Glyptotendipes viridis (Macquart, 1834)
- Glyptotendipes zavrelianus (Kieffer, 1922)
