= Blacktoft Sands RSPB reserve =

RSPB nature reserve in the East Riding of Yorkshire, England

Coordinates: 53.699485°N 0.724097°W

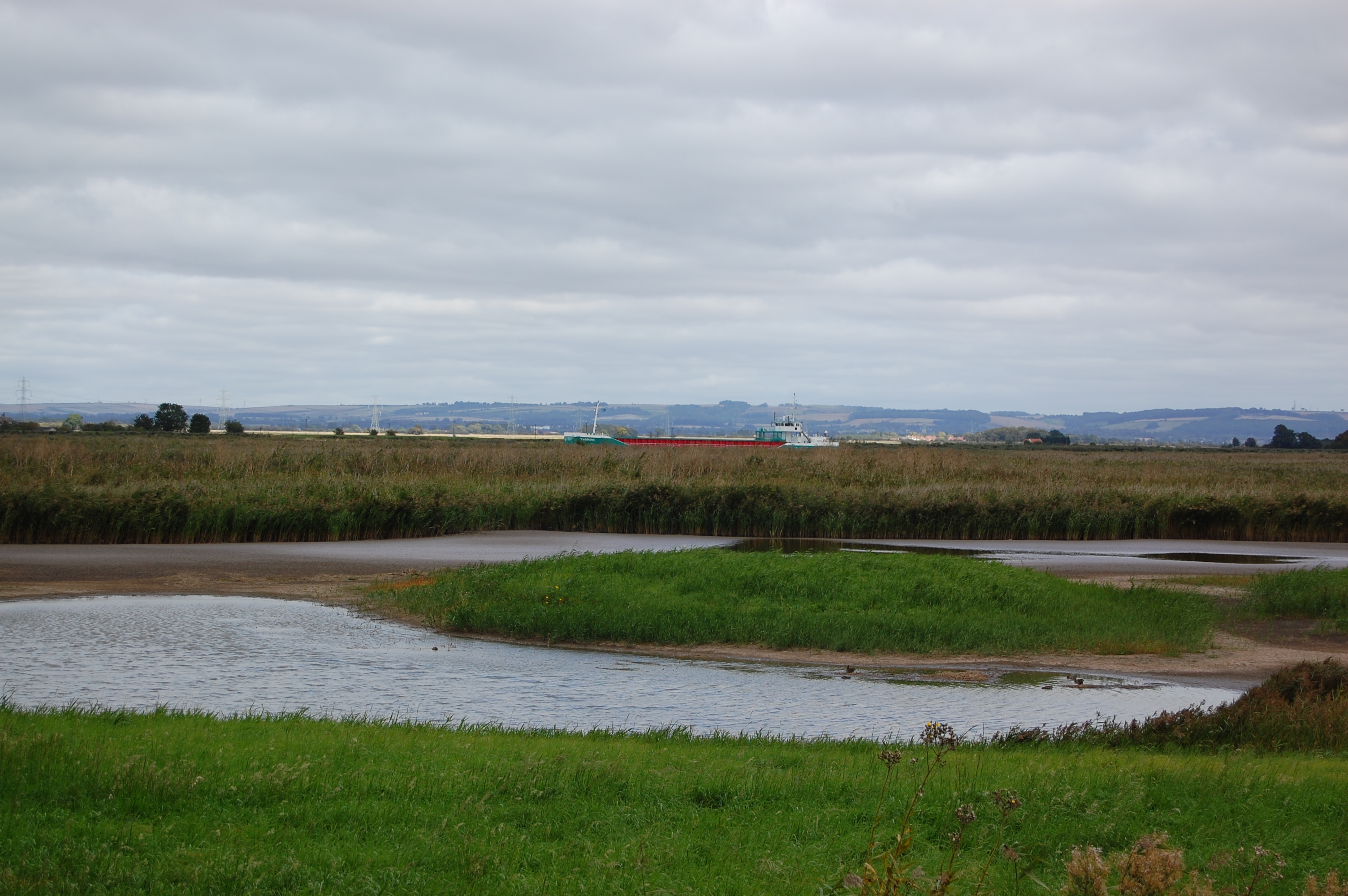
View from the Marshland bird hide, with a ship, on the Ouse, en route to Goole, in the background.

Blacktoft Sands RSPB reserve is a nature reserve in the East Riding of Yorkshire, England. It is managed by the Royal Society for the Protection of Birds, which leases the site from Associated British Ports.

== Description ==
The site is on the southern bank of the Ouse, west of its confluence with the River Trent, opposite the village of Blacktoft, and is a wetland. Being at the beginning of the Humber Estuary, the water is slightly saline. The reserve's tidal reedbed is the largest in England. It is managed using a mixture of grazing with six konik horses, reed cutting and maintaining and excavation of pools within the reedbed.

== Wildlife ==
As an RSPB reserve Blacktoft Sands is known for its birdlife. The headline species are wetland birds which are rare in Britain. Breeding birds include Western marsh harrier, great bittern and bearded reedling which are reedbed specialists, while the pied avocet prefers the saline lagoons. Hen harrier is a notable wintering species, joining the previously mentioned species, along with merlin, peregrine falcon and barn owl. Large numbers of Eurasian teal and Eurasian wigeon also winter. The great bitterns first bred in 2000 and the pied avocets in 1992 and the Humber is now home to nationally important populations of these species. The Humber Estuary overall is important for breeding and wintering waders and wildfowl. The site is also important for passage birds such as Eurasian spoonbill, spotted redshank and ruff.

The lagoons are home to some rare specialist invertebrates including the amphipods Gammarus insensibilis and Gammarus chevreuxi, as well as the chironomid Glyptotendipes barbipes.
