= Broselow tape =

Color-coded length-based tape measure that is used for pediatric emergencies

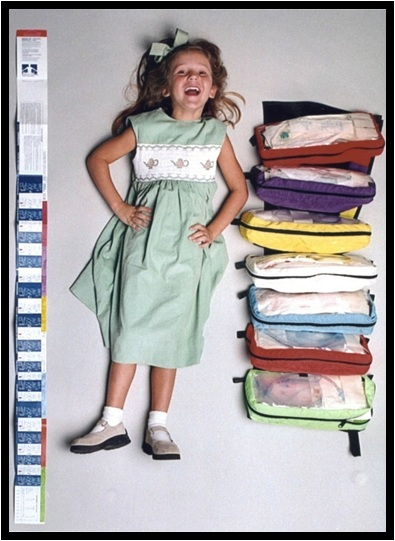
- The Broselow Tape and associated system

The Broselow Tape, also called the Broselow pediatric emergency tape, is a color-coded length-based tape measure that is used throughout the world for pediatric emergencies. The Broselow Tape relates a child's height as measured by the tape to their weight to provide medical instructions including medication dosages, the size of the equipment that should be used, and the level of energy when using a defibrillator. Particular to children is the need to calculate all these therapies for each child individually. In an emergency, the time required to do this detracts from valuable time needed to evaluate, initiate, and monitor patient treatment. The Broselow Tape is designed for children up to approximately 12 years of age who have a maximum weight of roughly 36 kg (79 lb). The Broselow Tape is recognized in most medical textbooks and publications as a standard for the emergency treatment of children.

== Usage ==
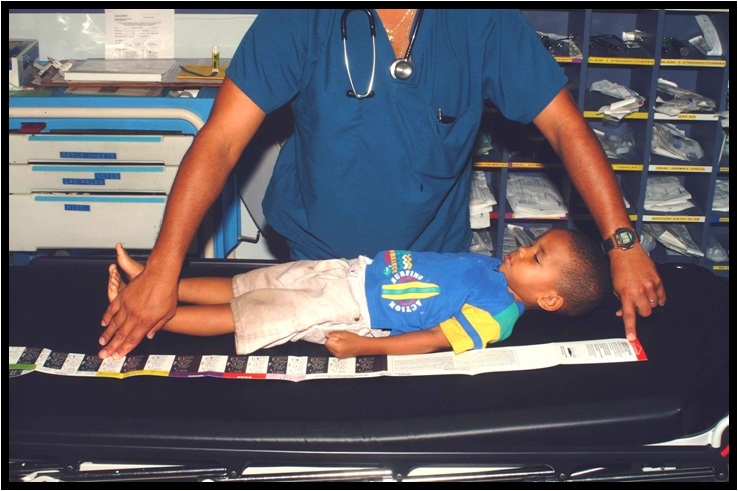
Properly measuring a child with the Broselow Tape

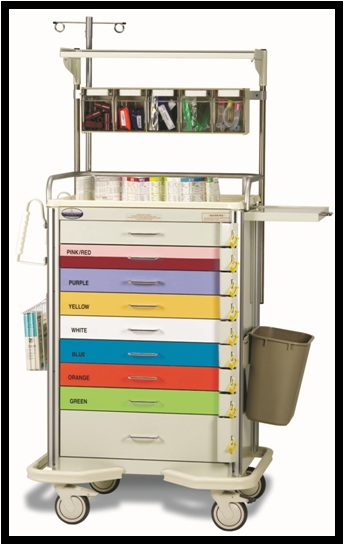
Color coded equipment drawers based on the Broselow Tape

To use the Broselow Tape effectively, the child must be lying down. Use one hand to hold the red end of the tape, so it is even with the child's head. (Remember: "red to head"). While maintaining one hand on the red portion at the top of the child's head, use your free hand to run the tape down the length of the child's body until it is even with their heels (not toes). The tape that is level with the child's heels will provide their approximate weight in kilograms and their color zone.

As the tape is not completely accurate, care is required with its use.

=== Accuracy ===
The Broselow Tape is based on the relationship between weight and length; each color zone estimates the 50th percentile weight for length, which for practical purposes estimates the ideal body weight (IBW) for emergency dosing. Because of the recent obesity epidemic, concerns have been raised as to the accuracy of the tape to determine acceptable weights and subsequently acceptable doses of emergency medications.

The most recent version of the Broselow Tape incorporates updated length/weight zones based on the most current National Health and Nutrition Examination Survey data set. Utilizing this data set to examine Broselow Tape predictions of actual body weight with the revised zones reveals that approximately 65% of the time the patient's measured length places them in the correct zone for actual weight. Of the remaining 35%, ~20% fall into the heavier Broselow-Luten zone above and 13% fall into the lighter zone below, with < 1% outliers falling greater than 1 zone from predicted. If the healthcare provider incorporates a visual estimate of body habitus into the prediction, the accuracy of the estimate of actual patient weight is improved, as confirmed in multiple studies. Specifically, for drug dosing, the patient's length-based dosing zone can be adjusted up one color zone if the child appears overweight. Thus, incorporating a visual estimate of whether the child is overweight provides a simple method to predict actual patient weight that appears to be clinically relevant given the rise in obesity in the U.S.

Although some medications are best dosed by actual body weight (e.g., succinylcholine), most resuscitation medications are distributed in lean body mass (e.g., epinephrine, sodium bicarbonate, calcium, magnesium, etc.) so that IBW as accurately predicted by length, not the actual body weight, would appear preferable for dosing. For most resuscitation medications, the optimal dose is not known, and doses based on IBW or actual weight are likely equally effective.

The PALS guidelines comment on this issue: "There are no data regarding the safety or efficacy of adjusting the doses of resuscitation medications in obese patients. Therefore, regardless of the patient’s habitus, use the actual body weight for calculating initial resuscitation drug doses or use a body length tape with pre-calculated doses."

Studies on the accuracy of predicting endotracheal tube sizes consistently demonstrate the superiority of length predictions over other methods. Unlike medication dosing, body habitus therefore does not affect the accuracy of the prediction.

Recommendation for how to use of the Broselow tape.

Utilizing clinical judgment applied to each situation:

1. Measure child to identify weight/color zone.
2. If a child appears overweight consider utilizing one zone higher for dosing only.
3. Always use the tape measured length zone for equipment selection regardless of body habitus.

Multiple studies have been conducted regarding the effectiveness of the Broselow Tape. In 2012, a study with 572 enrolled subjects published that paramedic Broselow measurements correlated well with both scale and ED measurements, underscoring its utility in the prehospital setting. There are debates about accuracy in actual weight estimation and its relevance as noted above. The tape is still considered by some to be the best tool for predicting actual body weight.

== Design ==
The original Broselow tape was divided into 2.5 kg (5.5 lb) zones for medication doses and eight color zones for equipment selection. Subsequent versions of the tape combined dosing and equipment zones such that the eight color zones contained both dosing and equipment information, thus creating a simple visual system for medication and equipment which is used in most hospitals and ambulances.

The following list identifies which color zones correlate with each estimated weight zone in kilograms (kg) and pounds (lb).

Color	Age	Height, cm	Estimated weight, kg	Estimated weight, lb
Grey	Newborn	46.8-51.9	3	6.6
Grey	Newborn	51.9-55.0	4	8.8
Grey	2 month	55.0-59.2	5	11
Pink	4 month	59.2-66.9	6-7	13-15
Red	8 month	66.9-74.2	8-9	17-20
Purple	1 year	74.2-83.8	10-11	22-24
Yellow	2 years	83.8-95.4	12-14	26-30
White	4 years	95.4-108.3	15-18	33-40
Blue	6 years	108.3-121.5	19-23	42-50
Orange	8 years	121.5-130.7	24-29	53-64
Green	10 years	130.7-143.3	30-36	66-80

== History ==
Emergency physicians James Broselow and Robert Luten struggled with solving these issues related to the emergency treatment of children in the early 1980s. The result was the invention by Broselow of a home-made prototype version of the tape in 1985. Broselow joined with Luten, an academic physician from the University of Florida and member of the newly formed pediatric advanced life support subcommittee, to do the foundational studies upon which the tape was based and to develop and update the tape over the years.

The tape provides pre-calculated medication doses, effectively eliminating the potential errors associated with pediatric emergent dosing preparation and administration. This benefit has had major implications in recent years, given the prevalence and magnitude of medication errors. Medical errors are a greater threat to children than adults because their organs are smaller and still developing. An estimated 35% of pediatric patients are incorrectly dosed by EMS providers. Tenfold mathematical errors due to incorrect calculations are a much greater threat to children than adults. Due to the high level of incorrect calculation errors, alternative pediatric emergency tapes that can be customized have gained popularity. A tenfold adult overdose of a standard adult medication would require multiple syringes and tends, therefore, to be obvious to a caregiver, effectively warning of the error. In contrast, for a small child both a 1x correct dose and a 10x overdose of a drug can be administered in the same syringe, thus providing no clue as to a potential error. Furthermore, pediatric emergency care is especially prone to error due to the chaotic nature and stress associated with the emergency setting.
