= Weight phobia =

The term weight phobia might refer or relate to:

- Fatphobia, also known as obesophobia, prejudicial assumptions that are based on an assessment of a person as being overweight or obese
- Anorexia nervosa, an eating disorder in which people avoid eating due to concerns about body weight or body image
- Bulimia nervosa, an eating disorder in which people show an excessive concern with body shape and weight
