= Human body weight =

Person's mass or weight

Human body weight is a person's mass or weight.

Strictly speaking, body weight is the measurement of mass without items located on the person. Practically though, body weight may be measured with clothes on, but without shoes or heavy accessories such as mobile phones and wallets, and using manual or digital weighing scales. Excess or reduced body weight is regarded as an indicator of determining a person's health, with body volume measurement providing an extra dimension by calculating the distribution of body weight.

== Estimation in children ==
An example of a half unfolded Broselow tape

There are a number of methods to estimate weight in children for circumstances (such as emergencies) when actual weight cannot be measured. Most involve a parent or health care provider guessing the child's weight through weight-estimation formulas. These formulas base their findings on the child's age and tape-based systems of weight estimation. Of the many formulas that have been used for estimating body weight, some include the Advanced Pediatric Life Support formula, the Leffler formula, and Theron formula. There are also several types of tape-based systems for estimating children's weight, with the best-known being the Broselow tape. The Broselow tape is based on length with weight read from the appropriate color area. Newer systems, such as the PAWPER tape, make use of a simple two-step process to estimate weight: the length-based weight estimation is modified according to the child's body habitus to increase the accuracy of the final weight prediction.

The Leffler formula is used for children 0–10 years of age. In those less than a year old, it is

$$m = \tfrac{1}{2}a_m + 4$$

and for those 1–10 years old, it is

$$m = 2a_y + 10$$

where m is the number of kilograms the child weighs and a_{m} and a_{y} respectively are the number of months or years old the child is.

The Theron formula is

$$m = e^{0.175571a_y + 2.197099}$$

where m and a_{y} are as above.

== Fluctuation ==
Body weight varies in small amounts throughout the day, as the amount of water in the body is not constant. It changes due to activities such as drinking, urinating, or exercise. Professional sports participants may deliberately dehydrate themselves to enter a lower weight class, a practice known as weight cutting.

== Ideal body weight ==
Ideal body weight (IBW) was initially introduced by Ben J. Devine in 1974 to allow estimation of drug clearances in obese patients; researchers have since shown that the metabolism of certain drugs relates more to IBW than total body weight. The term was based on the use of insurance data that demonstrated the relative mortality for males and females according to different height-weight combinations.

The most common estimation of IBW is by the Devine formula; other models exist and have been noted to give similar results. Other methods used in estimating the ideal body weight are body mass index and the Hamwi method. The IBW is not the perfect fat measurement, as it does not show the fat or muscle percentage in one's body. For example, athletes' results may show that they are overweight when they are actually very fit and healthy. Machines like the dual-energy X-ray absorptiometry can accurately measure the percentage and weight of fat, muscle, and bone in a body.

=== Devine formula ===
The Devine formula for calculating ideal body weight in adults is as follows:

- Male ideal body weight = 50 kilograms (110 lb) + 0.9 kilograms (2.0 lb) × (height (cm) − 152)
- Female ideal body weight = 45.5 kilograms (100 lb) + 0.9 kilograms (2.0 lb) × (height (cm) − 152)

=== Hamwi method ===
The Hamwi method is used to calculate the ideal body weight of the general adult:

- Male ideal body weight = 48 kilograms (106 lb) + 1.1 kilograms (2.4 lb) × (height (cm) − 152)
- Female ideal body weight = 45.4 kilograms (100 lb) + 0.9 kilograms (2.0 lb) × (height (cm) − 152)

== Usage ==
=== Sports ===
Many disciplines in weightlifting or combat sports separate competitors into weight classes.

=== Medicine ===
Ideal body weight, specifically the Devine formula, is used clinically for multiple reasons, most commonly in estimating renal function in drug dosing, and predicting pharmacokinetics in morbidly obese patients.

== Average weight around the world ==
=== By region ===
Data from 2005:

Region	Adult population (millions)	Average weight	% Overweight	Ref
Africa	535	60.7 kg (133.8 lb)	28.9%	
Asia	2,815	57.7 kg (127.2 lb)	24.2%	
Europe	606	70.8 kg (156.1 lb)	55.6%	
Latin America and the Caribbean	386	67.9 kg (149.7 lb)	57.9%	
North America	263	80.7 kg (177.9 lb)	73.9%	
Oceania	24	74.1 kg (163.4 lb)	63.3%	
World	4,630	62.0 kg (136.7 lb)	34.7%	

=== By country ===
Country	Average male weight	Average female weight	Sample population / age range	Method	Year	Ref
Afghanistan	69.2 kg (152.6 lb)	62.6 kg (138.0 lb)	18–69	Measured	2018	
Algeria	77.6 kg (171.1 lb)	73.1 kg (161.2 lb)	18-25	Measured	2026	
Armenia	74.6 kg (164.5 lb)	66.4 kg (146.4 lb)	18–69	Measured	2016	
Australia	87.0 kg (191.8 lb)	71.8 kg (158.3 lb)	18+	Measured	2018	
Azerbaijan	72.1 kg (159.0 lb)	65.7 kg (144.8 lb)	16+	Measured	2005	
Bangladesh	55.2 kg (121.7 lb)	49.8 kg (109.8 lb)	25+	Measured	2009–2010	
Belarus	69 kg (152.1 lb)	56 kg (123.5 lb)	18+	Measured	2008	
Belize	74.2 kg (163.6 lb)	70.5 kg (155.4 lb)	20+	Measured	2010	
Benin	63.7 kg (140.4 lb)	60.9 kg (134.3 lb)	18–69	Measured	2015	
Bhutan	63.2 kg (139.3 lb)	57.4 kg (126.5 lb)	18–69	Measured	2014	
Botswana	63.6 kg (140.2 lb)	64.3 kg (141.8 lb)	15–69	Measured	2014	
Brazil	72.7 kg (160.3 lb)	62.5 kg (137.8 lb)	20–74	Measured	2008–2009	
Brunei	74.1 kg (163.4 lb)	62.9 kg (138.7 lb)	19+	Measured	2010–2011	
Bulgaria	76.9 kg (169.5 lb)	69.1 kg (152.3 lb)	21–59	Self-reported	2021	
Burkina Faso	65.2 kg (143.7 lb)	59.0 kg (130.1 lb)	25–64	Measured	2013	
Cambodia	56.8 kg (125.2 lb)	50.8 kg (112.0 lb)	25–64	Measured	2010	
Cameroon	68.3 kg (150.6 lb)	67.0 kg (147.7 lb)	15+	Measured	2003	
Canada	84.6 kg (187 lb)	70.1 kg (155 lb)	18–79	Measured	2007–2009	
Chile	77.3 kg (170.4 lb)	67.5 kg (148.8 lb)	15+	Measured	2009–2010	
China	75 kg (165.3 lb)	59.8 kg (131.8 lb)	18-80	Measured	2022	
Costa Rica - San José	76.6 kg (168.9 lb)	64.9 kg (143.1 lb)	20+	Measured	2010	
Czech Republic	92.1 kg (203.0 lb)	73.8 kg (162.7 lb)	25–64	Measured	2016–2017	
Estonia	84.4 kg (186.1 lb)	71.2 kg (157.0 lb)	18+	Measured	2003–2010	
France	77.1 kg (170 lb)	62.7 kg (138 lb)	15+	Measured	2005	
Georgia	84.4 kg (186.1 lb)	73.6 kg (162.3 lb)	18–69	Measured	2016	
Germany	85.9 kg (189.4 lb)	69.2 kg (152.6 lb)	18+	Self-reported	2021	
India	65.0 kg (143.3 lb)	55.0 kg (121.3 lb)	16+	Measured	2020	
Japan	67.4 kg (148.6 lb)	53.6 kg (118.2 lb)	20+	Measured	2019	
Norway	86.6 kg (190.9 lb)	71.6 kg (157.9 lb)	18+	Self-reported	2020	
Oman	74.9 kg (165.1 lb)	68.1 kg (150.1 lb)	18+	Measured	2017	
Pakistan	66.0 kg (145.5 lb)	59.0 kg (130.1 lb)	18–69	Measured	2013–2014	
Papua New Guinea	62.5 kg (137.8 lb)	56.8 kg (125.2 lb)	15–64	Measured	2007–2008	
Qatar	84.6 kg (186.5 lb)	73.4 kg (161.8 lb)	18–64	Measured	2012	
Russia	70.6 kg (155.6 lb)	60.2 kg (132.7 lb)	19+	Measured	2018	
Rwanda	58.4 kg (128.7 lb)	55.9 kg (123.2 lb)	15–64	Measured	2012–2013	
Saint Kitts and Nevis	84.5 kg (186.3 lb)	83.0 kg (183.0 lb)	25–64	Measured	2007–2008	
Saudi Arabia	77.3 kg (170.4 lb)	71.7 kg (158.1 lb)	25–64	Measured	2005	
Serbia	84.6 kg (186.5 lb)	70.0 kg (154.3 lb)	20+	Measured	2013	
Sierra Leone	62.0 kg (136.7 lb)	59.0 kg (130.1 lb)	25–64	Measured	2009	
Singapore	70.2 kg (154.8 lb)	58.8 kg (129.6 lb)	21+	Measured	2021	
Solomon Islands	75.3 kg (166.0 lb)	70.4 kg (155.2 lb)	25–64	Measured	2006	
South Korea	73.34 kg (161.7 lb)	58.29 kg (128.5 lb)	18+	Measured	2019	
Spain	82.4 kg (181.7 lb)	66.6 kg (146.8 lb)	18–64	Measured	2013	
Sri Lanka	61.4 kg (135.4 lb)	54.6 kg (120.4 lb)	18–69	Measured	2014–2015	
Sudan	65.4 kg (144.2 lb)	61.6 kg (135.8 lb)	18–69	Measured	2016	
Sweden	81.9 kg (180.6 lb)	66.7 kg (147.0 lb)	16–84	Measured	2003–2004	
Togo	63.2 kg (139.3 lb)	60.0 kg (132.3 lb)	15–64	Measured	2010	
Tonga	99.4 kg (219.1 lb)	97.7 kg (215.4 lb)	25–64	Measured	2012	
Trinidad and Tobago	76.7 kg (169.1 lb)	71.1 kg (156.7 lb)	15–64	Measured	2011	
Turkey	78.0 kg (172.0 lb)	70.1 kg (154.5 lb)	15+	Measured	2017	
Turkmenistan	76.6 kg (168.9 lb)	67.4 kg (148.6 lb)	18–69	Measured	2018	
United Kingdom – England	85.4 kg (188.3 lb)	72.1 kg (159.0 lb)	16+	Measured	2019	
United Kingdom – Wales	84.0 kg (185.2 lb)	69.0 kg (152.1 lb)	16+	Measured	2009	
Ukraine	80.0 kg (176.4 lb)	71.0 kg (156.5 lb)	18+	Measured	2020	
United States	90.3 kg (199.1 lb)	77.9 kg (171.7 lb)	20+	Measured	2021–2023	

==== Global statistics ====
Researchers at the London School of Hygiene and Tropical Medicine published a study of average weights of adult humans in the journal BMC Public Health and at the United Nations conference Rio+20.

Rank	Country	Kilograms	Pounds	Relative size
1	Micronesia	87.398	192.68	
2	Tonga	87.344	192.56	
3	United States	81.928	180.62	
4	Samoa	78.544	173.16	
5	Kuwait	77.791	171.50	
6	Australia	77.356	170.54	
7	Malta	76.956	169.66	
8	Qatar	76.866	169.46	
9	Croatia	76.412	168.46	
10	United Kingdom	75.795	167.10	
11	UAE	75.532	166.52	
12	Greece	75.038	165.43	
13	Cyprus	74.802	164.91	
14	Egypt	74.271	163.74	
15	Barbados	73.831	162.77	
16	Belarus	73.663	162.40	
17	Bahrain	73.550	162.15	
18	Germany	73.042	161.03	
19	Solomon Islands	72.797	160.49	
20	Austria	72.743	160.37	
21	Saudi Arabia	72.638	160.14	
22	Iceland	72.584	160.02	
23	Trinidad & Tobago	72.538	159.92	
24	Argentina	72.434	159.69	
25	Bahamas	72.380	159.57	
26	Finland	72.348	159.50	
27	Israel	71.912	158.54	
28	Czech Rep.	71.640	157.94	
29	New Zealand	71.631	157.92	
30	Bulgaria	71.459	157.54	
31	Russia	71.418	157.45	
32	Slovenia	71.200	156.97	
33	Slovakia	71.060	156.66	
34	Albania	71.019	156.57	
35	Bosnia	71.001	156.53	
36	Switzerland	70.987	156.50	
37	Rep. of Moldova	70.978	156.48	
38	Venezuela	70.788	156.06	
39	Chile	70.593	155.63	
40	Georgia	70.561	155.56	
41	Spain	70.556	155.55	
42	Azerbaijan	70.484	155.39	
43	Hungary	70.443	155.30	
44	Libya	70.429	155.27	
45	Luxembourg	70.270	154.92	
46	Tajikistan	70.234	154.84	
47	Portugal	70.193	154.75	
48	Lithuania	70.153	154.66	
49	Grenada	70.139	154.63	
50	Panama	69.939	154.19	
51	Ireland	69.926	154.16	
52	Canada	69.767	153.81	
53	Jordan	69.649	153.55	
54	St Vincent & Grenadines	69.590	153.42	
55	Belize	69.377	152.95	
56	Poland	69.241	152.65	
57	Macedonia	69.209	152.58	
58	Italy	69.205	152.57	
59	Jamaica	69.064	152.26	
60	Sweden	69.064	152.26	
61	Turkey	69.046	152.22	
62	Cuba	69.037	152.20	
63	Mexico	69.023	152.17	
64	Mongolia	68.910	151.92	
65	Uruguay	68.873	151.84	
66	Belgium	68.801	151.68	
67	Suriname	68.778	151.63	
68	Latvia	68.778	151.63	
69	Norway	68.774	151.62	
70	Netherlands	68.746	151.56	
71	Ukraine	68.674	151.40	
72	Guatemala	68.579	151.19	
73	Saint Lucia	68.438	150.88	
74	Armenia	68.424	150.85	
75	Nicaragua	68.415	150.83	
76	Vanuatu	68.229	150.42	
77	El Salvador	68.220	150.40	
78	Lebanon	68.170	150.29	
79	Ecuador	68.166	150.28	
80	Fiji	68.048	150.02	
81	Bolivia	68.034	149.99	
82	Dominican Rep.	67.993	149.90	
83	Denmark	67.957	149.82	
84	Costa Rica	67.853	149.59	
85	Tunisia	67.726	149.31	
86	Iran	67.608	149.05	
87	Turkmenistan	67.563	148.95	
88	Paraguay	67.445	148.69	
89	Peru	67.440	148.68	
90	Syria	67.422	148.64	
91	Guyana	67.032	147.78	
92	France	66.782	147.23	
93	Estonia	66.732	147.12	
94	Equatorial Guinea	66.451	146.50	
95	Romania	66.401	146.39	
96	Colombia	66.370	146.32	
97	Uzbekistan	66.351	146.28	
98	Kazakhstan	66.265	146.09	
99	Brazil	66.093	145.71	
100	Mauritius	66.052	145.62	
101	Iraq	66.034	145.58	
102	Lesotho	65.966	145.43	
103	Honduras	65.834	145.14	
104	Oman	65.803	145.07	
105	South Africa	65.667	144.77	
106	Kyrgyzstan	65.413	144.21	
107	Botswana	65.045	143.40	
108	Cameroon	64.832	142.93	
109	Morocco	64.764	142.78	
110	South Korea	64.392	141.96	
111	Mauritania	64.179	141.49	
112	Algeria	63.639	140.30	
113	Gabon	62.845	138.55	
114	Ghana	62.491	137.77	
115	Cape Verde	62.296	137.34	
116	Papua New Guinea	62.251	137.24	
117	Eswatini	62.097	136.90	
118	Djibouti	62.015	136.72	
119	Haiti	61.698	136.02	
120	Comoros	61.044	134.58	
121	Zimbabwe	61.022	134.53	
122	Brunei	60.945	134.36	
123	Sierra Leone	60.854	134.16	
124	Nigeria	60.745	133.92	
125	Malaysia	60.682	133.78	
126	China	60.555	133.50	
127	Angola	60.387	133.13	
128	Senegal	60.373	133.10	
129	Benin	60.282	132.90	
130	Mali	60.078	132.45	
131	Yemen	59.802	131.84	
132	Philippines	59.715	131.65	
133	Namibia	59.584	131.36	
134	Sudan	59.407	130.97	
135	Togo	59.280	130.69	
136	Guinea	59.112	130.32	
137	Japan	59.017	130.11	
138	Pakistan	58.976	130.02	
139	Singapore	58.935	129.93	
140	Thailand	58.786	129.60	
141	Côte d'Ivoire	58.727	129.47	
142	Laos	58.436	128.83	
143	Chad	58.196	128.30	
144	Niger	57.933	127.72	
145	Maldives	57.647	127.09	
146	São Tomé and Príncipe	57.561	126.90	
147	Burkina Faso	57.456	126.67	
148	Congo	57.384	126.51	
149	Tanzania	57.293	126.31	
150	Gambia	57.071	125.82	
151	Uganda	57.007	125.68	
152	Afghanistan	56.935	125.52	
153	Malawi	56.681	124.96	
154	Rwanda	56.635	124.86	
155	Myanmar	56.354	124.24	
156	Kenya	56.264	124.04	
157	Guinea-Bissau	56.087	123.65	
158	Mozambique	55.955	123.36	
159	Central African Rep.	55.946	123.34	
160	Zambia	55.910	123.26	
161	Cambodia	55.742	122.89	
162	Liberia	55.533	122.43	
163	Somalia	55.375	122.08	
164	Madagascar	55.157	121.60	
165	Burundi	54.127	119.33	
166	Congo	53.501	117.95	
167	Ethiopia	53.057	116.97	
168	India	52.943	116.72	
169	North Korea	52.589	115.94	
170	Indonesia	52.467	115.67	
171	Eritrea	52.041	114.73	
172	Timor-Leste	51.950	114.53	
173	Bhutan	51.142	112.75	
174	Vietnam	50.725	111.83	
175	Nepal	50.476	111.28	
176	Sri Lanka	50.421	111.16	
177	Bangladesh	49.591	109.33	
—	world average	61.997	136.68	

== See also ==
- Anthropometry
- Bergmann's rule
- Birth weight
- Body mass index (BMI)
- Classification of obesity
- Emaciation
- Hesse's Rule
- History of anthropometry
- Human height
- List of heaviest people
- Obesity
- Overweight
- Set point theory
- Stone (unit) § human body weight
- Thermoregulation in humans
- Underweight
- Weight loss and weight gain
- Weight phobia (disambiguation)
- Exercise paradox
