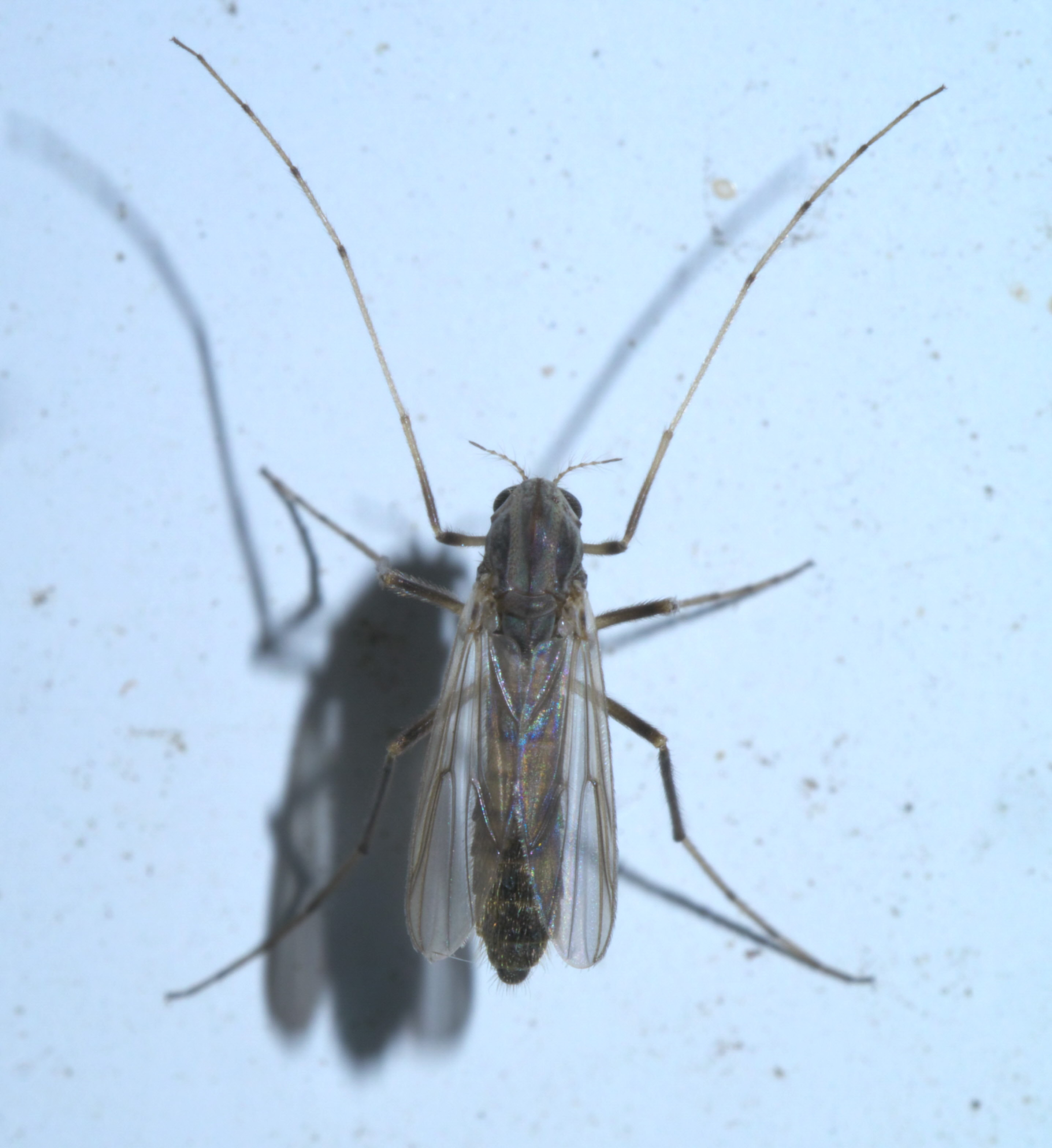

Scientific classification
- Kingdom: Animalia
- Phylum: Arthropoda
- Class: Insecta
- Order: Diptera
- Family: Chironomidae
- Tribe: Chironomini
- Genus: Glyptotendipes
- Species: G. barbipes

Binomial name
- Glyptotendipes barbipes (Staeger, 1839)

Synonyms
- Chironomus barbipes Staeger, 1839

= Glyptotendipes barbipes =

Species of fly

Glyptotendipes barbipes is a species of midge in the family Chironomidae. It is found in Europe.

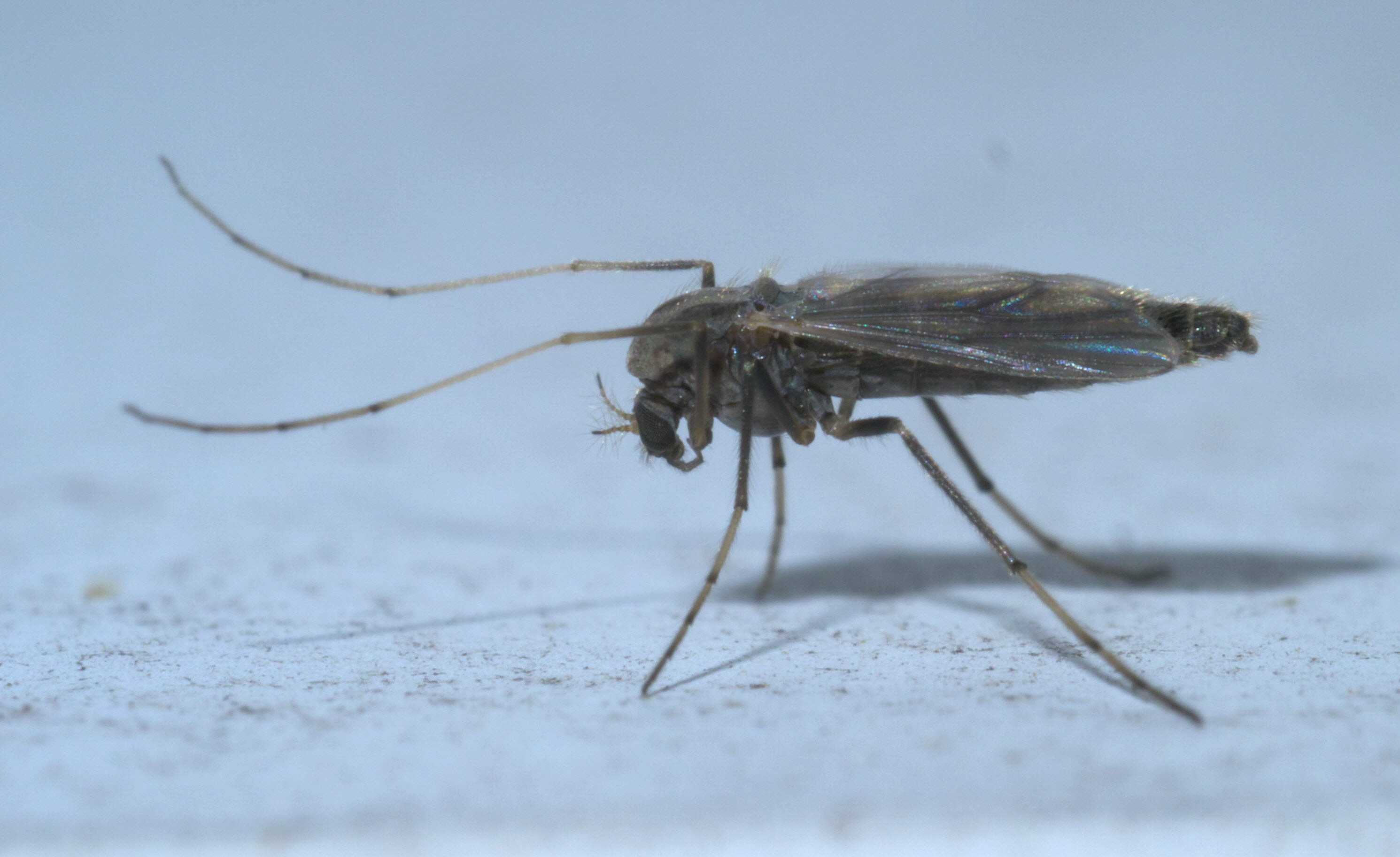

== Subspecies ==
These two subspecies belong to the species Glyptotendipes barbipes:

- Glyptotendipes barbipes barbipes
- Glyptotendipes barbipes staegeri Kruseman, 1933
