= Set point theory =

Theory in human biology

Set point theory, as it pertains to human body weight, states that there is a biological control method in humans that actively regulates weight towards a predetermined set weight for each individual. This may occur through regulation of energy intake (e.g. via increased or decreased appetite) or energy expenditure (e.g. via reduced metabolism or feelings of lethargy). Set point theory explains why it is difficult for dieters to maintain weight loss over time, as calorie restriction may become less effective or more difficult to maintain as regulatory mechanisms in the body actively push the body back towards the set point weight.

Set point theory differentiates between active compensation and passive compensation. Passive compensation describes processes where a decrease in body fat leads to less energy being expended, because one carries around less weight in daily activities. In addition to passive compensation, set point theory also posits active compensation. Here additional regulatory mechanism in the body affects energy expenditure or intake.

Set point theory can be construed as implying weight regulation in a wide or tight range around the set point, in a symmetric or in an asymmetric manner (i.e. treating weight gain and loss either the same or differently), and may apply to regulation of body fat levels specifically (in a multi-compartment model) or to overall body weight.

Set point theory applies to both downward and upward adjustment of weight. This return to the pre-change weight occurs faster than would be expected if individuals simply returned to their normal caloric intake and energy expenditure even after accounting for lower energy needs after weight loss, indicating an active response by the body encouraging weight gain. While the set point applies to both deviations driven by weight loss and weight gain, the set point response driving a person to regain weight to regain the set point is stronger than the response to lose weight after gaining weight above the set point, implying that it may be easier to gain than to lose weight.

== Evidence ==
In humans, when calories are restricted because of war, famine, or diet, lost weight is typically regained quickly, including for obese patients. In the Minnesota Starvation Experiment, after human subjects were fed a near-starvation diet for a period, losing 66% of their initial fat mass, and later allowed to eat freely, they reattained and even surpassed their original fat levels, reaching 145% of the pre-starvation fat levels.

Evidence for an organism-level set point has been found experimentally in "normal" rats and in rats with dorsomedial hypothalamic lesions. However, it has not been proven in humans.

== Mechanism ==
As there has not been one unique mechanism identified to be behind weight regulation, it is likely that there are multiple factors reaching a shared equilibrium that result in a stable bodyweight. Leptin is known to play a key role in appetite and thus weight regulation, and may be important in regulating the set point and regulating body weight towards the set point. Changing leptin levels – either associated with weight gain or loss, or induced via central or peripheral administration in animal models – directly alter feeding behaviour and energy expenditure. Individuals who, due to genetic mutation, are unable to produce functional leptin or who produce leptin but are insensitive to it are prone to develop obesity. This has been confirmed by experimental "knockdown" of leptin receptors in the lateral hypothalamus in rats, which caused the rats to consume more calories and increase in body weight compared to control rats. However, most human obesity is not linked to failure to normally process leptin.

== Criticism and alternatives ==
While set point theory has been supported in animals and humans, it may not apply to humans eating a western diet, which may be obesogenic to an extent that it overcomes the homeostatic process set forth in set point theory. Set point theory does not on its own explain why body mass index for humans, measured as a proxy for fat, tends to change with increasing age or why obesity levels in a population vary depending on socioeconomic or environmental factors (or why weight tends to change for an individual when socioeconomic status and environment change).

One alternative to set point theory is settling points. With settling points, an increase (or decrease) in calories consumed leads to an increase (or decrease) of energy expended until an equilibrium is reached; this differs from set point theory in that the increase (or decrease) in energy expenditure may be driven by an increase (or decrease) in fat or lean mass without regard to a fixed set weight or fat level and without active regulation to offset the increased (or decreased) consumption. However, the return to normal weight after subjects have their caloric intake strictly limited happens faster than would be expected in a model without active regulation (i.e. subjects return to normal weight faster than if they simply returned to normal eating habits).

Another alternative is the dual intervention point model. The dual intervention point model posits that rather than a body weight set point, there is a set range for body weight. Under this model, active compensation happens only outside of upper and lower intervention points, and for weights within the set range, environmental factors would have a strong effect on body weight since there would only be passive compensation for changes in weight. Differences in propensity for obesity between individuals would then be explained as individuals prone to obesity having a wide set range that extends into higher weights. In the dual intervention model, the lower and upper limits of the range are independently set, with the lower end of the range set by evolutionary pressure due to the risk of starvation if too much weight is lost and the upper bound set by pressure due to increased risk of predation if too much weight is gained.

== See also ==
- Setpoint (control system) for the general concept as it applies to control systems in general.
