= List of medical specialty colleges in the United States =

This list of medical specialty colleges in the United States includes medical societies that represent board certified specialist physicians. The American Medical Association maintains a list of societies represented in its House of Delegates, while the American Association of Colleges of Osteopathic Medicine maintains a list of osteopathic specialty colleges. The American Association of Physician Specialists maintains a list of specialties colleges open to physicians with either M.D. or D.O. degrees. Some societies are not affiliated with these associations.

== List ==
| Name | Specialty | Fellow post-nominal letters | Association |
|---|---|---|---|
| Academy of Consultation-Liaison Psychiatry | Consultation-Liaison Psychiatry | FACLP | AMA |
| Aerospace Medical Association | Aerospace | | AMA |
| American Academy of Allergy, Asthma, and Immunology | Allergy, Asthma, & Immunology | FAAAAI | AMA |
| American Academy of Anesthesiology | Anesthesiology | FAAA | AAPS |
| American Academy of Child and Adolescent Psychiatry | Child and adolescent psychiatry | FAACAP | AMA |
| American Academy of Cosmetic Surgery | Cosmetic surgery | ABCS | AMA |
| American Academy of Dermatology | Dermatology | FAAD | AMA |
| American Academy of Disaster Medicine | Disaster medicine | FAADM | AAPS |
| American Academy of Emergency Medicine | Emergency medicine | FAAEM | |
| American Academy of Emergency Physicians | Emergency Medicine | FAAEP | AAPS |
| American Academy of Facial Plastic and Reconstructive Surgery | Plastic surgery | | AMA |
| American Academy of Family Medicine | Family medicine | FAAFM | |
| American Academy of Family Physicians | Family medicine | FAAFP | AMA |
| American Academy of Family Practice | Family medicine | FAAFP | AAPS |
| American Academy of Geriatric Medicine | Geriatric medicine | | AAPS |
| American Academy of Hospice and Palliative Medicine | Hospice and palliative care | | AMA |
| American Academy of Insurance Medicine | Health insurance | | AMA |
| American Academy of Internal Medicine | Internal medicine | FAAIM | AAPS |
| American Academy of Neurologic & Orthopedic Surgery | Neurologic and Orthopedic Surgery | FAANOS | AMA |
| American Academy of Neurology | Neurology | FAAN | AMA |
| American Academy of Obstetrics and Gynecology | Obstetrics and gynecology | | |
| American Academy of Ophthalmology | Ophthalmology | | AMA |
| American Academy of Orthopaedic Surgeons | Orthopedic surgery | FAAOS | AMA |
| American Academy of Orthopedic Surgery | Orthopedic surgery | | AAPS |
| American Academy of Osteopathy | Osteopathic manipulative medicine | FAAO | AACOM |
| American Academy of Otolaryngic Allergy | Allergy & Otolaryngology | | AMA |
| American Academy of Otolaryngology–Head and Neck Surgery | Otolaryngology | | AMA |
| American Academy of Pain Medicine | Pain management | | AMA |
| American Academy of Pediatrics | Pediatrics | FAAP | AMA |
| American Academy of Pharmaceutical Physicians | Pharmaceuticals | | AMA |
| American Academy of Physical Medicine and Rehabilitation | Physical medicine and rehabilitation | | AMA |
| American Academy of Plastic and Reconstructive Surgery | Plastic surgery | | |
| American Academy of Psychiatry & the Law | Psychiatry | | AMA |
| American Academy of Radiology | Radiology | | AAPS |
| American Academy of Sleep Medicine | Sleep | | AMA |
| American Academy of Surgery | Surgery | FAAS | AAPS |
| American Association for Hand Surgery | Hand surgery | | AMA |
| American Association for Thoracic Surgery | Thoracic surgery | | AMA |
| American Association of Clinical Endocrinologists | Endocrinology | | AMA |
| American Association of Clinical Urologists | Urology | | AMA |
| American Association of Neuromuscular and Electrodiagnostic Medicine | Neuromuscular medicine and electrodiagnosis | | AMA |
| American Association of Gynecologic Laparoscopists | Gynecology | | AMA |
| American Association of Hip & Knee Surgeons | Orthopedic surgery | | AMA |
| American Association of Medical Review Officers | Medical review officer | CMRO | |
| American Association of Neurological Surgeons | Neurosurgery | FAANS | AMA |
| American Association of Plastic Surgeons | Plastic surgery | | AMA |
| American Association of Public Health Physicians | Public health | | AMA |
| American Clinical Neurophysiology Society | Neurology | | AMA |
| American College of Allergy, Asthma & Immunology | Allergy, Asthma, & Immunology | | AMA |
| American College of Cardiology | Cardiology | FACC | AMA |
| American College of Chest Physicians | Chest medicine | FCCP | AMA |
| American College of Critical Care Medicine | Critical care medicine | FCCM | |
| American College of Emergency Physicians | Emergency medicine | FACEP | AMA |
| American College of Epidemiology | Epidemiology | FACE | |
| American College of Family Practice | Family practice | FACFP | |
| American College of Gastroenterology | Gastroenterology | FACG | AMA |
| American College of Hyperbaric Medicine | Hyperbaric medicine | FACHM | |
| American College of Medical Genetics | Medical genetics | FACMG | AMA |
| American College of Medical Informatics | Medical informatics | FACMI | |
| American College of Medical Practice Executives | | FACMPE | |
| American College of Medical Quality | | | AMA |
| American College of Nuclear Medicine | Nuclear medicine | | AMA |
| American College of Nuclear Physicians | Nuclear medicine | | AMA |
| American College of Nutrition | Nutrition | FACN | |
| American College of Occupational and Environmental Medicine | Occupational and environmental medicine | FACOEM | AMA |
| American College of Osteopathic Emergency Physicians | Emergency medicine | FACOEP | AACOM |
| American College of Osteopathic Family Physicians | Family medicine | FACOFP | AACOM |
| American College of Osteopathic Internists | Internal medicine | FACOI | AACOM |
| American College of Osteopathic Neurologists and Psychiatrists | Neurology & Psychiatry | | AACOM |
| American College of Osteopathic Obstetricians & Gynecologists | Obstetrics and gynecology | FACOOG | AACOM |
| American College of Osteopathic Sclerotherapeutic Pain Management | Pain management | | AACOM |
| American College of Osteopathic Pediatricians | Pediatrics | FACOP | AACOM |
| American College of Osteopathic Surgeons | Surgery | FACOS | AACOM |
| American College of Phlebology | Phlebology | FACPh | |
| American College of Physician Executives | | CPE | AMA |
| American College of Physicians | Internal medicine | FACP | AMA |
| American College of Preventive Medicine | Preventive medicine | FACPM | AMA |
| American College of Radiation Oncology | Radiation oncology | FACRO | AMA |
| American College of Psychiatrists | Psychiatry | | |
| American College of Radiology | Radiology | FACR | AMA |
| American College of Rheumatology | Rheumatology | | AMA |
| American College of Sports Medicine | Sports medicine | FACSM | |
| American College of Surgeons | Surgery | FACS | AMA |
| American College of Obstetricians and Gynecologists | Obstetrics and gynecology | FACOG | AMA |
| American Gastroenterological Association | Gastroenterology | AGAF | AMA |
| American Geriatrics Society | Geriatrics | | AMA |
| American Heart Association | Cardiology | FAHA | |
| American Institute of Ultrasound in Medicine | Ultrasound | | AMA |
| American Medical Directors Association | | | AMA |
| American Medical Group Association | | | AMA |
| American Medical Society for Sports Medicine | Sports medicine | FAMSSM | AMA |
| American Orthopaedic Association | Orthopedics | | AMA |
| American Orthopaedic Foot and Ankle Society | Orthopedics | | AMA |
| American Osteopathic Academy of Addiction Medicine | Drug addiction | FAOAAM | AACOM |
| American Osteopathic Association of Medical Informatics | Medical informatics | | AACOM |
| American Osteopathic Association of Prolotherapy Regenerative Medicine | Prolotherapy Regenerative Medicine | | AACOM |
| American Osteopathic Society of Rheumatic Diseases | Rheumatic Diseases | | AACOM |
| American Osteopathic Academy of Orthopedics | Orthopedic surgery | FAOAO | AACOM |
| American Osteopathic Academy of Sports Medicine | Sports medicine | FAOASM | AACOM |
| American Osteopathic College of Allergy and Immunology | Allergy & Immunology | | AACOM |
| American Osteopathic College of Anesthesiologists | Anesthesiology | | AACOM |
| American Osteopathic College of Dermatology | Dermatology | FAOCD | AACOM |
| American Osteopathic College of Occupational & Preventive Medicine | Occupational and preventive medicine | FAOCOPM | AACOM |
| American Osteopathic Colleges of Ophthalmology and Otolaryngology–Head and Neck Surgery | Ophthalmology and otolaryngology | FOCOO | AACOM |
| American Osteopathic College of Pathologists | Pathology | FAOCP | AACOM |
| American Osteopathic College of Physical Medicine and Rehabilitation | Physical medicine and rehabilitation | | AACOM |
| American Osteopathic College of Proctology | Proctology | | AACOM |
| American Osteopathic College of Radiology | Radiology | FAOCR | AACOM |
| American Pediatric Surgical Association | Pediatric surgery | | AMA |
| American Psychiatric Association | Psychiatry | FAPA | AMA |
| American Roentgen Ray Society | X-rays | | AMA |
| American Society for Aesthetic Plastic Surgery | Plastic surgery | | AMA |
| American Society for Clinical Pathology | Pathology | FASCP | AMA |
| American Society for Dermatologic Surgery | Dermatology | | AMA |
| American Society for Gastrointestinal Endoscopy | Gastroenterology | | AMA |
| American Society for Reproductive Medicine | Reproductive medicine | | AMA |
| American Society for Surgery of the Hand | Hand surgery | | AMA |
| American Society for Therapeutic Radiology and Oncology | Radiology & Oncology | | AMA |
| American Society of Abdominal Surgeons | Abdominal surgery | | AMA |
| American Society of Addiction Medicine | Drug addiction | | AMA |
| American Society of Anesthesiologists | Anesthesiology | | AMA |
| American Society of Bariatric Physicians | Bariatrics | | AMA |
| American Society of Cataract and Refractive Surgery | Cataract and refractive surgery | | AMA |
| American Society of Clinical Oncology | Oncology | | AMA |
| American Society of Colon and Rectal Surgeons | Lower gastrointestinal surgery | | AMA |
| American Society of Cytopathology | Cytopathology | | AMA |
| American Society of General Surgeons | General surgery | | AMA |
| American Society of Hematology | Hematology | | AMA |
| American Society of Maxillofacial Surgeons | Plastic surgery | | AMA |
| American Society of Neuroimaging | Neuroimaging | | AMA |
| American Society of Neuroradiology | Neuroradiology | | AMA |
| American Society of Nuclear Cardiology | Cardiology | FASNC | AMA |
| American Society of Ophthalmic Plastic and Reconstructive Surgery | Ophthalmic surgery | | AMA |
| American Society of Plastic Surgeons | Plastic surgery | | AMA |
| American Society of Retina Specialists | Retina | | AMA |
| American Thoracic Society | Thorax | | AMA |
| American Urological Association | Urology | | AUA |
| Association of Military Surgeons of the United States | Military medicine | | AMA |
| Association of University Radiologists | Radiology | | AMA |
| College of American Pathologists | Pathology | FCAP | AMA |
| Congress of Neurological Surgeons | Neurosurgery | | AMA |
| Contact Lens Association of Ophthalmologists | Ophthalmology | | AMA |
| Infectious Diseases Society of America | Infectious disease | | AMA |
| International College of Surgeons United States Section | Surgery | | AMA |
| International Spine Intervention Society | Spine | | AMA |
| National Association of Medical Examiners | Medical examiners | | AMA |
| National Medical Association | African Americans | | AMA |
| North American Spine Society | Spine | | AMA |
| Radiological Society of North America | Radiology | | AMA |
| Renal Physicians Association | Kidney | | AMA |
| Society for Investigative Dermatology | Dermatology | | AMA |
| Society for Vascular Surgery | Vascular surgery | | AMA |
| Society of American Gastrointestinal and Endoscopic Surgeons | Gastroenterology | | AMA |
| Society of Critical Care Medicine | Critical care medicine | | AMA |
| Society of Interventional Radiology | Interventional radiology | | AMA |
| Society of Laparoendoscopic Surgeons | Laparoscopic surgery | | AMA |
| Society of Medical Consultants to the Armed Forces | Military medicine | | AMA |
| Society of Nuclear Medicine and Molecular Imaging | Nuclear medicine | | AMA |
| Society of Radiologists in Ultrasound | Ultrasound | | AMA |
| Society of Thoracic Surgeons | Thoracic surgery | | AMA |
| The Endocrine Society | Endocrinology | | AMA |
| The Triological Society | Otolaryngology | | AMA |
| United States and Canadian Academy of Pathology | Pathology | | AMA |

== See also ==
- Board certification
- Medical education in the United States
