= Francis M. Fesmire =

American emergency physician (1969–2014)

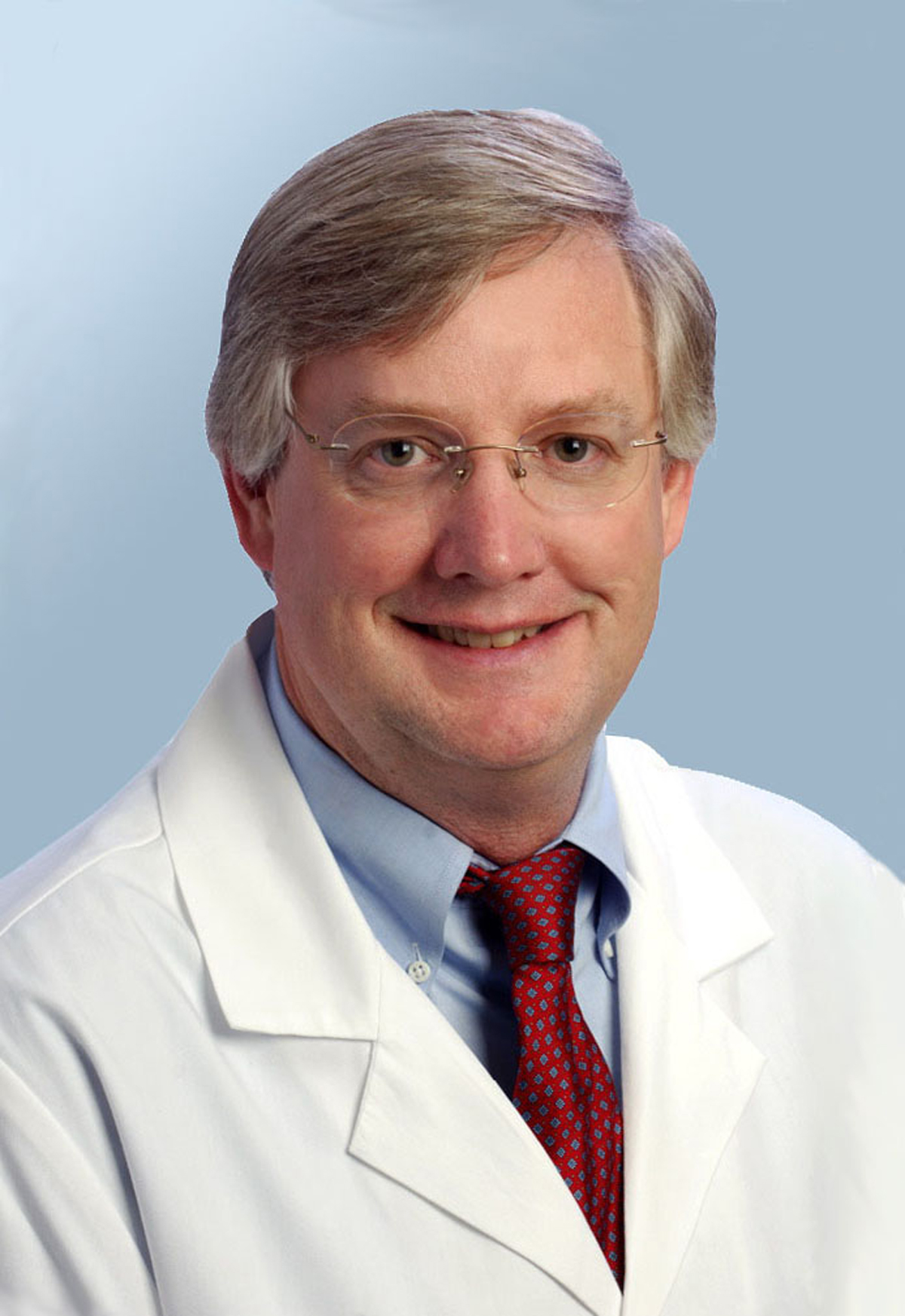
- Born: November 16, 1959; Atlanta, Georgia, U.S.
- Died: January 31, 2014 (aged 54); Chattanooga, Tennessee, U.S.
- Education: Baylor School; Harvard College; Vanderbilt University Medical School
- Medical career
- Field: Emergency medicine
- Institutions: University of Tennessee College of Medicine
- Sub-specialties: Myocardial infarction
- Awards: Young Investigator Award (1996); Ig Nobel Prize in Medicine (2006); Hero of Emergency Medicine (2008)

Francis Miller Fesmire (November 16, 1959 – January 31, 2014) was an American emergency physician and a nationally recognized expert in myocardial infarction. He authored numerous academic articles and assisted in the development of clinical guidelines on the standard of care in treating patients with suspected myocardial infarction by the American College of Emergency Physicians and the American Heart Association/American College of Cardiology. He performed numerous research investigations in chest pain patients, reporting the usefulness of continuous 12-lead ECG monitoring, two-hour delta cardiac marker testing, and nuclear cardiac stress testing in the emergency department. The culmination of his studies was The Erlanger Chest Pain Evaluation Protocol published in the Annals of Emergency Medicine in 2002. In 2011 he published a novel Nashville Skyline that received a 5 star review by ForeWord Reviews. His most recent research involved the risk stratification of chest pain patients in the emergency department.

== Background ==
Born in 1959 in Atlanta, Georgia, Fesmire grew up in Chattanooga, Tennessee and graduated high school Valedictorian from the Baylor School in 1978. He graduated Magna Cum Laude from Harvard College in 1981. Fesmire graduated from Vanderbilt University School of Medicine in 1985 and completed a residency in Emergency Medicine at University Hospital in Jacksonville, Florida in 1988 where he received the Outstanding Resident Award. In 1992 Fesmire was elected as a Fellow of American College of Emergency Physicians. He practiced as an emergency physician at Chattanooga Memorial Hospital from 1988 until 1991 and had been practicing at Erlanger Baroness Hospital from 1991 until his death in 2014.

== Awards ==
Fesmire received the Emergency Medicine Foundation's Young Investigator Award in 1996 for his work in developing a rapid protocol for the evaluation of chest pain patients. In 2006, he received the Ig Nobel Prize in Medicine for a 1988 case report detailing the use of digital rectal massage as a cure for persistent singultus (hiccups). In 2008, Dr Fesmire was named a Hero of Emergency Medicine by the American College of Emergency Physicians.

He later on told New Scientist in an interview that he found a "treatment sure to be more popular with hiccup patients. "An orgasm results in incredible stimulation of the vagus nerve. From now on, I will be recommending sex – culminating with orgasm – as the cure-all for intractable hiccups"."

== Later work ==
At the time of his death, Fesmire lived in Chattanooga with his wife and two sons. He was medical director of Chest Pain Center of Erlanger Medical Center. He was also professor and clinical research director of the Emergency Medicine Residency Program of the University of Tennessee College of Medicine and chairman of the Clinical Policy Committee of the American College of Emergency Physicians.

== See also ==
- List of Ig Nobel Prize winners
