= Coalition on Psychiatric Emergencies =

- Abbreviation: CPE
- Purpose: emergency psychiatry
- Region served: United States
- Website: https://coalitiononpsychiatricemergencies.org/

The Coalition on Psychiatric Emergencies (CPE) is a collaborative working group of behavioral health, psychiatry, and emergency medicine professionals headed by the American College of Emergency Physicians. CPE represents several professional organizations, making it a large collaborative in the field of emergency psychiatry in the United States.

== History ==
According to CPE's website, the coalition came out of a "psychiatric emergency summit" in December 2014.

== Activities ==
CPE hosted its "1st Annual Research Consensus Conference on Acute Mental Illness" on December 7–9, 2016 in Las Vegas, NV. According to 2023-2024 CPE Chair Dr. Michael Wilson, CPE has conducted several activities to support the creation of a new Focused Practice Designation in Emergency Behavioral Health.

== Formation ==
The coalition's member organizations represent multiple healthcare disciplines, including emergency physicians, nurses, pharmacists, and other stakeholders. CPE is composed of the following member organizations:

- American Association for Community Psychiatry
- American Association for Emergency Psychiatry
- American College of Emergency Physicians
- American Academy of Emergency Medicine
- American Psychiatric Association
- Association of Academic Chairs in Emergency Medicine
- Depression and Bipolar Support Alliance
- Emergency Nurses Association
- Emergency Medicine Residents Association
- National Alliance on Mental Illness
- Society for Academic Emergency Medicine
- Suicide Prevention Resource Center

CPE past supporters (but not representative members) include Teva Pharmaceutical Industries, New Directions and Alexza Pharmaceuticals.

== Reception ==
The formation of CPE has been widely reported in the medical media.

=== Praise ===
Scott Zeller, MD, Chief of Psychiatric Emergency Services for the Alameda Health System, has described the collaborative as "unprecedented." Peggy DeCarlis, chief operating and innovation officer of New Directions Behavioral Health, has expressed "excitement" towards her organization's partnership with CPE.

=== Criticism ===
David W. Covington, LPC, MBA, CEO and president of RI International, an international provider of recovery services, has suggested that the "reinforcements" that CPE will bring to American emergency departments are not enough to combat the problems that emergency departments face in dealing with acute psychiatric emergencies.
