= Joseph Waeckerle =

American physician

Joseph Farrell Waeckerle MD, FACEP
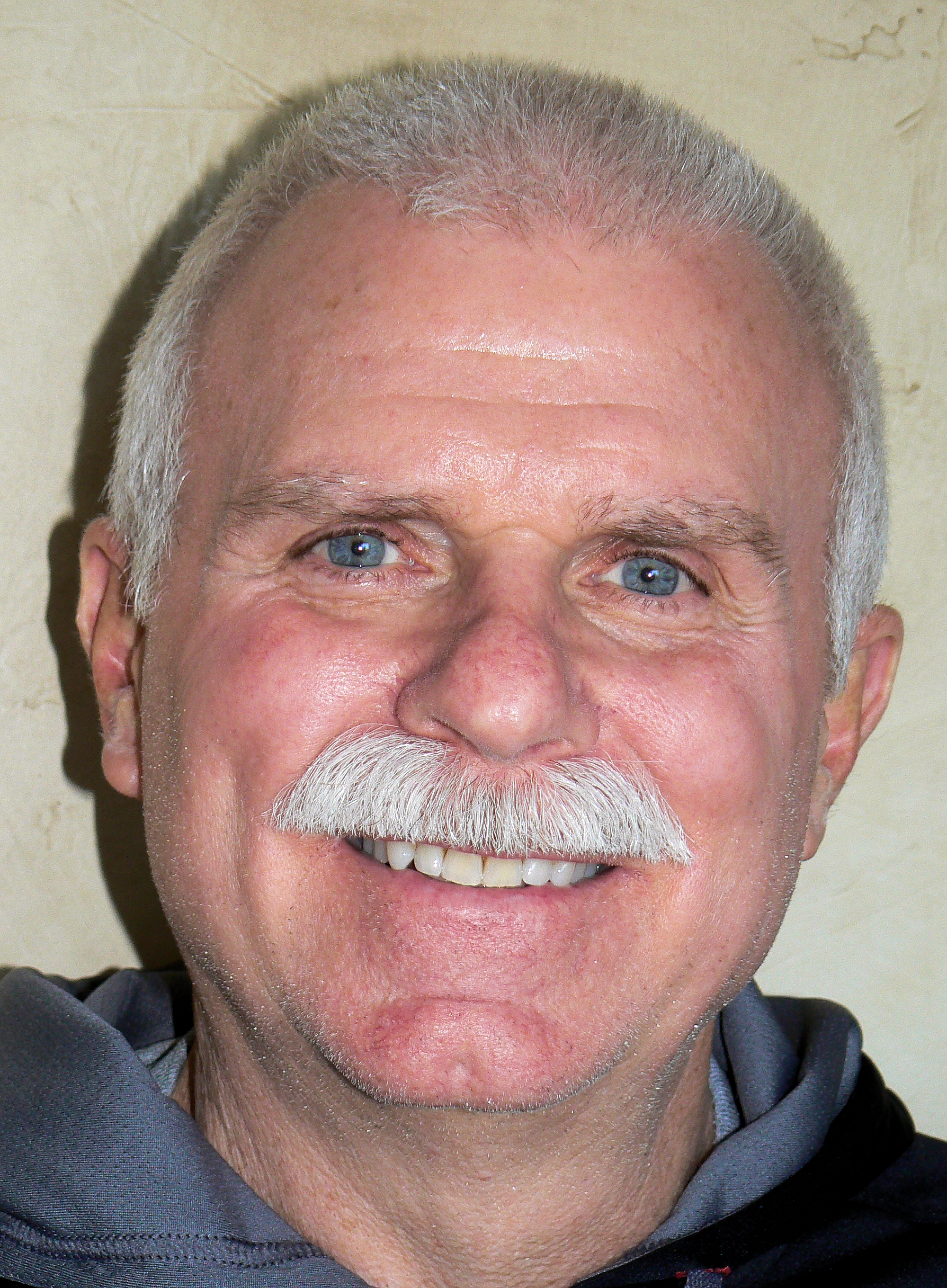
- Born: June 20, 1946 (age 80); Kansas City, Missouri
- Education: University of Kansas (B.A.), Chapman College; University of Missouri (M.D.); University of Kansas Masters Program
- Occupations: Emergency Physician, Sports Physician
- Board member of: Diplomat, American Board of Emergency Medicine; Sports Medicine – American Board of Emergency Medicine

Joseph F. Waeckerle is an American physician specializing in emergency and sports medicine. He directed the search and rescue efforts at the Hyatt Regency walkway collapse in Kansas City, Missouri on July 17, 1981. He is currently Clinical Professor of Emergency Medicine, University of Missouri–Kansas City School of Medicine and Editor Emeritus of Annals of Emergency Medicine. He previously served as Chief Medical Officer for the Office of Homeland Security, State of Missouri and as Medical Officer for the Kansas City Division of the FBI.

== Life and career ==
=== Early life ===
Waeckerle was born June 20, 1946, in Kansas City, Missouri, and graduated from Rockhurst High School in 1964. He has had a lifelong relationship with Rockhurst, volunteering his medical services to the school's sports teams.

=== Education ===
He obtained a B.A. from the University of Kansas in 1968, spending a semester at Chapman University's World Campus Afloat program, and his M.D. from the University of Missouri in Columbia, Missouri, in 1972.

== Medical career ==
=== Residency ===
In 1972 he served his first year as an Orthopedic Resident at Akron City Hospital in Akron, Ohio, then the next two years as an Emergency Medicine Resident at Kansas City General Hospital in Kansas City, Missouri, becoming Chief Resident and helping to establish Kansas City's Emergency Medical Services system. He founded the Emergency Medicine Residents' Association (EMRA) in 1974. He also became a member of the American College of Emergency Physicians (ACEP) and the University Association of Emergency Medicine (UAEM) in 1974.

=== Emergency medicine ===
Waeckerle's career in Emergency Medicine began in 1973 when he was selected to be a member of the first Emergency Medicine residency class at Kansas City General Hospital. During his residency he was selected the first Chief Resident and became very active in establishing the Emergency Medical Services system of Kansas City, Mo. He subsequently served as its first Medical Director. Waeckerle founded the Emergency Medicine Residency Association (EMRA) in 1974 which represents emergency medicine residents to all major organizations within the specialty and other organizations in the house of medicine. He became a member of the American College of Emergency Physicians (ACEP) and the University Association of Emergency Medicine (UAEM – now the Society of Academic Emergency Medicine SAEM) in 1974. He represented EMRA on the Executive Council of UAEM and was very active resident on various committees for ACEP including the College Issues and Planning and Scientific Meetings Committees.

After completion of his residency in 1975 he joined the faculty of his residency program and continued his work with the EMS system and the major organizations in Emergency Medicine. He was board certified by the American Board of Emergency Medicine (ABEM) in 1980 with the first class of Diplomats. Subsequently, he became very active with ABEM as an examiner, Team Leader for examiners, Committee member and one of two representatives for the development of Guidelines for Certification in Sports Medicine. He received his Certificate of Added Qualifications in Sports Medicine through the ABEM examination process. He continued active service to ACEP, SAEM, Society of Critical Care Medicine, Liaison Residency Endorsement Committee of the AMA, and Emergency Medicine Foundation. He focused on continuing medical education, research, wellness, wound care, and scientific meetings activities. He ultimately served as President for the Society of Academic Emergency Medicine; Director, Board of Directors, of the American College of Emergency Physicians; and Director, Board of Directors, Emergency Medicine Foundation.

=== Sports medicine ===
Waeckerle's first experience in Sports Medicine was as medical officer for Rugby football at the local, regional, national and international levels. He served as the team physician for the Kansas City Blues Rugby Club, chief medical officer for the Western United States Rugby Union and medical officer for the United States Rugby Union.

He has been very active in Special Olympics of Kansas and International Special Olympics. He was the medical officer and a member of the Executive Committee for Special Olympics of Kansas for a number of years. In addition, he served as a member of the Medical Advisory Committee of International Special Olympics during which time he was the Chief Medical Officer for the Special Olympics Delegation to the Games of the XXIV Olympiad in Seoul, Korea. He was a member of the United States Olympic Committee, Sports Medicine Division, and Committee on Disabled Athletes as well.

He has served as a team physician for Big Brother and Big Sisters Annual High School All Star Football Game, the Kansas City Marathon and Kansas City Triathlon chief physician, team physician for the University of Missouri at Kansas City and team physician for Rockhurst High School.

Finally, Waeckerle was the first emergency physician to be a team physician for the NFL as the team physician in Emergency Medicine and Sports Medicine for the Kansas City Chiefs Football Club, invited to do so in 1990. He continued in that role until 2010. He has also served the NFL as a member of the Committee on Mild Traumatic Brain Injury from 1995 until 2009 when that committee was retired. He was then appointed to the new committee, Head, Neck and Spine Injury Committee of the NFL. He also served on the NFL's Committee on Grants and the NFL's Committee on the Spine Injured Athlete. During his tenure, the various committees have made significant contributions to the peer-reviewed literature in mild traumatic brain injury as well as major white papers for NFL team physicians and sports medicine physicians and granting funds to worthy researchers interested in sports medicine.

In 2009, Waeckerle was invited to be a member of the NFL Players Association Mackey/White Traumatic Brain Injury Committee. He is the only physician to be invited to serve on both the NFL and NFL Players Association committees on traumatic brain injuries.

In addition to publishing multiple studies on concussions in athletes he has also published studies on cardio-metabolic syndrome in professional football players and baseball players.

=== Disaster medicine ===
Waeckerle has testified before the United States Congress on Domestic Preparedness issues multiple times. He has lectured and published extensively in the field of disaster medicine and domestic preparedness.

His experience directing the response at the Hyatt collapse has made him a leading authority on planning the response to disasters and domestic preparedness. He was Official Liaison in Disaster Medicine for the American College of Emergency Physicians. He chaired the Task Force on Domestic Preparedness Against Weapons of Mass Destruction for the Office of Emergency Preparedness, Department of Health and Human Services.

He was invited by the Department of Defense to participate in the Defense Science Board's Task Force on Defense Against Biological Weapons and by the Veterans Hospital Administration to serve on the Technical Advisory Committee on Domestic Preparedness. He served as a member of the Roundtable on Emergency Preparedness, Joint Commission on Accreditation of Health Care Organizations.

=== Hyatt Regency walkway collapse ===
On July 17, 1981, Waeckerle had completed an eleven-hour shift in an emergency room, and was preparing for rugby season by running eleven flights of stairs at Baptist Medical Center and was heading home when he received a telephone call from the Emergency Management Service dispatcher that "the roof had collapsed" at the Hyatt Regency hotel. When he arrived at the Hyatt twelve minutes after the collapse, he started examining patients outside of the hotel, when he was directed into the hotel by a paramedic and started directing the triage, establishing a makeshift morgue in a ground floor exhibition area, and directing the ambulatory patients out of the lobby area. Periodically, Waeckerle would whistle to silence all the rescue work to locate buried survivors. Some who were mortally injured but still conscious could only be given pain medicine.
