= Richard M. Levitan =

American emergency medicine physician

- Born: New York City, US
- Education: Williams College; New York University School of Medicine (MD)
- Occupations: Emergency medicine physician, businessperson
- Medical career
- Institutions: Littleton Regional Hospital; Geisel School of Medicine
- Research: Emergency medicine

Richard Mark Levitan is an American emergency medicine physician and businessperson. He is a clinical professor of medicine at Dartmouth College and a practicing physician at the Littleton Regional Hospital. He also runs a company that creates materials and runs events to teach emergency airway management.

== Early life and education ==
Levitan was born c. 1962 to Minna Osinoff and Milton Levitan in New York City. He graduated from Horace Mann School and Williams College, then completed a medical degree at New York University School of Medicine in 1994. He completed an internship and residency at Bellevue Hospital under Lewis R. Goldfrank. He is board certified by the American Board of Emergency Medicine.

== Career and research ==
After his residency, Levitan practiced in Philadelphia where he taught how to in perform intubations. In 1994, he invented an imaging system for teaching intubation, which his Airway Cam company now promotes. Levitan's clinical interests includes emergency medicine. As of 2020, he has worked as an emergency medicine doctor for 30 years. He is a practicing physician at the Littleton Regional Hospital in Littleton, New Hampshire. Levitan is a clinical professor of medicine at Dartmouth College's Geisel School of Medicine.

=== COVID-19 ===
In April 2020, Levitan volunteered for 10 days to help treat patients with COVID-19 at the emergency room of Bellevue Hospital in New York City. He observed many patients with pneumonia and hypoxia (low oxygen levels in blood) who did not have typical symptoms of breathing problems such as chest discomfort or painful breathing. Levitan suggested in a New York Times op-ed that the widespread use of pulse oximeters could lead to earlier detection of serious breathing complications, and to better outcomes for patients with these complications. Although the op-ed was covered in the news, other doctors cautioned that early detection might lead to overtreatment, and that the role of early detection of hypoxia in treating COVID-19 still needed to be studied. Levitan's hypothesis was supported by a prospective study appearing some months later in Academic Emergency Medicine, for which Levitan was invited to write an accompanying piece of commentary.

== Selected works ==
- Levitan, Richard M. (2004). Airway Cam Guide to Intubation and Practical Emergency Airway Management. Airway Cam Technologies. ISBN 978-1-929018-12-3.
- Levitan, Richard M. (2015). EMRA and AIRWAY-CAM Fundamentals of Airway Management. Emergency Medicine Residents' Association. ISBN 978-1-929854-39-4.
