= Donn Sorensen =

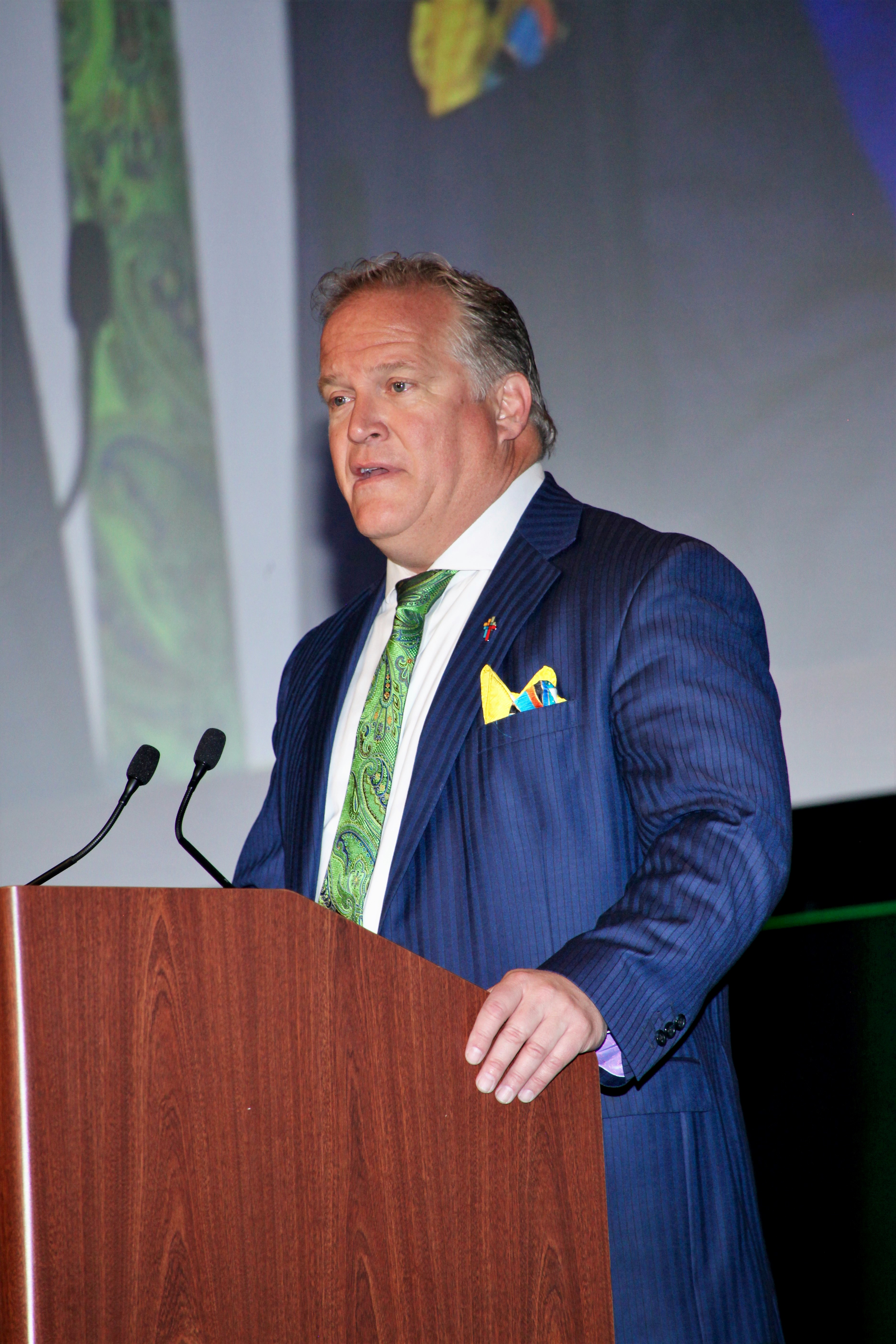
Sorensen speaking at a medical convention

Donn Sorensen (born April 11, 1961) is a healthcare executive, philanthropist, public speaker and author. Sorensen was the Chairman of Board and a member of the American Medical Group Association’s board of directors. He is also a fellow of the American College of Medical Practice Executives. In 2018, he was inducted into the Missouri Sports Hall of Fame

== Author ==
Sorensen is the author of Integrated Delivery Systems: A Cure for the Healthcare Delivery Crisis. The book provides guidance on how to lay the groundwork for a successful accountable care organization. Donn's latest book, Big Hearted Leadership: Five Keys to Create Success Through Compassion/ref>, is about "Honesty. Vulnerability. Humor. These are just a few of the values that make a leader. But above all of these is compassion. Putting your compassion for people first is key to being someone worthy of following."

== Public Speaking ==
Sorensen speaks at many events including conferences, healthcare conventions, and graduations.

== Philanthropy ==
Sorensen serves as the board chair of The Make-A-Wish Missouri Foundation.

== Prior Healthcare Work ==
Sorensen worked 25 years in health care including work with Premier Practice Management (a national practice operations organization), several specialty and multispecialty groups in Nashville, Tennessee, and Baton Rouge, Louisiana, and with the Mayo Clinic in Rochester, Minnesota.

== Education ==
Sorensen holds a master's degree in business administration from Southwest Missouri State University and Luther College in Decorah, Iowa.

== Controversies ==
Sorensen has been accused of sexual assault and extortion but has not faced criminal charges.
