= CPE =

CPE may refer to:

== Biochemistry ==
- Carbapenemase-producing enterobacteriaceae, a "superbug" resistant to antibiotics
- Carboxypeptidase E, an enzyme involved in the biosynthesis of neuropeptides and peptide hormones
- Clostridium perfringens enterotoxin, a contributor to food poisoning
- Cytopathic effect, changes in cells caused by viruses
- Cytoplasmic polyadenylation element, an RNA sequence
- Chlorinated polyethylene, a thermoplastic polymer
- Core promoter element, in DNA, initiating gene transcription

== Telecommunications ==
- Customer-premises equipment, any equipment which is the property of the network operator and located on the customer premises

== Science ==
- Carnian pluvial episode/event, a climatic episode and minor extinction-radiation event in the Triassic
- Carbon paste electrode, a special type of electrodes used in electrochemistry
- Charged-particle equilibrium
- Computer engineering
- Constant phase element of an equivalent electrical circuit

== Education ==
- Certificate of Primary Education, an academic qualification in Mauritius awarded upon the completion of primary school
- Certificate of Proficiency in English, a general English exam provided by the University of Cambridge
- Certified Professional Electrologist, board certification credential for permanent hair removal specialists
- Clinical pastoral education, training in pastoral care for religious workers
- Coalition on Psychiatric Emergencies, a coalition of organizations dedicated to improving care for mental health emergencies
- Common Professional Examination, a course which allows non-law graduates in England and Wales to convert to law after university
- Continuing professional education, or continuing professional development, is the means by which professionals maintain and develop the qualities required in their working lives
- École supérieure de chimie physique électronique de Lyon (CPE Lyon), a French engineering school
- Kentucky Council on Postsecondary Education
- Committee for Private Education, an accreditation body for private schools and tertiary education providers in Singapore

== Business ==
- Centrally planned economy
- First Employment Contract (contrat première embauche), a French form of work contract, retracted by the government in Spring 2006
- Cost Per Enplanement, a term used in commercial aviation regarding airport costs
- Cost per engagement, an online advertising selling model in which the vendor defines the "engagement" as form of currency or metric

== Organisations ==
- Centristi per l'Europa (Centrists for Europe), an Italian political party
- Communist Party of England (Marxist-Leninist), former name of Revolutionary Communist Party of Britain (Marxist–Leninist)
- CPE (investment firm), Chinese company
- Creative Power Entertaining, Chinese animation company

== Other uses ==
- Chinese Pidgin English, a pidgin language spoken in parts of China in the 17th to 19th centuries.
- Common Platform Enumeration, a component of the Security Content Automation Protocol (SCAP)
- CPE, IATA airport code for Ing. Alberto Acuña Ongay International Airport in Campeche, Mexico
- Carl Philipp Emanuel Bach (1714–1788), German Classical period musician and composer
- Communist Party of Estonia
