= Arthur Kellermann =

American physician (born 1954)

Arthur L. Kellermann
- Born: July 8, 1954 (age 72)
- Education: Bachelor of Science with distinction in biology from Rhodes College (1976); M.D. from the Emory University School of Medicine (1980); M.P.H. from the University of Washington School of Public Health (1985)
- Occupation: American physician; Epidemiologist; Author; Professor and Dean of Medicine
- Employer: Virginia Commonwealth University School of Medicine
- Known for: Founder of the department of emergency medicine at Emory University; Founder of the Center for Injury Control at Rollins School of Public Health; Research on the epidemiology of firearm-related injuries and deaths
- Website: www.usuhs.edu/national/faculty/arthur-kellermann-md-mph

Arthur L. Kellermann (born 1954) is an American physician and epidemiologist. Until his resignation in November 2022, he served as a professor of emergency medicine at the VCU School of Medicine, senior vice president of health sciences for Virginia Commonwealth University, and CEO of the VCU Health System. He was formerly professor and dean of the F. Edward Hébert School of Medicine at the Uniformed Services University of the Health Sciences. Kellerman served as director of the RAND Institute of Health and founded the department of emergency medicine at Emory University and the Center for Injury Control at Rollins School of Public Health. His writings include 200 publications on various aspects of emergency cardiac care, health services research, injury prevention and the role of emergency departments in providing health care to the poor. Kellermann is known for his research on the epidemiology of firearm-related injuries and deaths, which he interpreted not as random, unavoidable acts but as preventable public-health priorities. Kellermann and his research have been strongly disputed by gun rights organizations, in particular by the National Rifle Association of America, although Kellermann's findings have been supported by a large body of peer-reviewed research finding that increasing gun ownership is associated with increased rates of homicide and violence.

== Education ==
Kellermann received a Bachelor of Science with distinction in biology from Rhodes College (1976), an M.D. from the Emory University School of Medicine (1980), and an M.P.H. from the University of Washington School of Public Health (1985).

== Career ==
Kellermann was a professor of emergency medicine and public health at Emory School of Medicine from 1999 to 2010. He co-chaired the institute's Committee on the Consequences of Uninsurance, which produced six reports on "America's uninsured crisis: Consequences for health and health care" from 2001 to 2004. At Emory, Kellermann served as the associate dean for health policy (2007-2010), the first chair of the Department of Emergency Medicine (1999-2007), and the director of the Emory Center for Injury Control at the Rollins School of Public Health (1993-2006). In 2007, Kellermann received John G. Wiegenstein Leadership Award by the American College of Emergency Physicians.

From 2006 to 2007 he was a Robert Wood Johnson Foundation Health Policy Fellow and joined the staff of the United States House Committee on Oversight and Government Reform. In 2007 he was presented with the John G. Wiegenstein Leadership Award by the American College of Emergency Physicians.

Kellermann was chair in policy analysis at the RAND Corporation (2010-2013) and vice president and director at RAND Health (2011-2012). He co-chaired the Committee on the Consequences of Uninsurance of the Institute of Medicine of the National Academy of Sciences, of which he is an elected member. Kellermann holds career achievement awards for excellence in science from the Society for Academic Emergency Medicine, and the Injury Control and Emergency Health Services Section of the American Public Health Association. Kellermann is a fellow of the American College of Emergency Physicians and an elected member of the US National Academy of Sciences in the Institute of Medicine.

In a recent article published in Health Affairs, he advocated a number of changes to the military health system, including using medically trained enlisted members such as medics and corpsmen as "primary care technicians" in the stateside care system. He argued that their skills are currently under-utilized while not deployed, and that increasing the number of primary care providers would improve health outcomes and reduce costs.

=== Research ===
Kellermann's work includes more than 200 scientific and lay publications on various aspects of advanced cardiac life support, health services research, injury prevention and the role of emergency departments in providing health care to the poor. Kellermann is known for his research on the epidemiology of firearm-related injuries and deaths in the US. In a 1995 interview, Kellermann said he saw firearm injuries not as random, unavoidable acts but as preventable public health priority. Kellermann's studies, which indicate an increased risk of mortality associated with gun ownership, have been disputed by gun rights organizations, in particular by the National Rifle Association; although Kellermann's findings have been supported by a large body of peer-reviewed research finding that increasing gun ownership is associated with increased rates of homicide and violence.

Kellermann published several high-profile studies on the topic of gun-related injuries. In 1986, he coauthored a study published in the New England Journal of Medicine finding that for every self-defense homicide via firearm, there were 43 suicides, criminal homicides, or accidental gunshot deaths. He coauthored additional studies published in the New England Journal of Medicine identifying firearm ownership as a risk factor for both homicide and suicide in the home. Gary Kleck, in a paper, argued that most of the homicides in the 1993 study were not committed with the same gun kept in the household the decedent lived in. Kellermann responded that the mechanism behind the observed effect needed not result from the same gun kept in the household, but by the decedents having used these guns in failed self-defense.

Kellermann has published extensively in the areas of emergency medicine and public health, including studies of emergency cardiac care, use of diagnostic technologies in the emergency department, and on the use of progesterone as a treatment for traumatic brain injury. He has also published research on the role of emergency departments in providing health care to the poor, the role of insurance, and the situation of the uninsured. In recent years, he has written about domestic preparedness to respond to different forms of terrorism. Kellermann was instrumental in the planning and implementation of the American Heart Association's "Racing the Clock to Restart Atlanta's Hearts" initiative. He also played a role in the Institute of Medicine’s three-volume report on the Future of Emergency Care in the United States.
