= Dental software =

Technology used in dentistry

Computers and software have been used in dental medicine since the 1960s. Since then, computers and information technology have spread progressively in dental practice. According to one study, in 2000, 85.1% of all dentists in the United States were using computers.

== Classification ==
Schleyer and Kirshner categorized dental software as administrative, clinical, and for the Internet. Zimmerman et al. categorized dental software functions for administration and management of patients documentation, electronic archives of the documentation, telecommunication, computer - aided education, computerizing instruments and techniques in the dental office software assisting with clinical decision making.

=== Patient Records Management Dental Software ===
Patient records management dental software is used by the dentist to organize the records of the patients in their practice. The computer patients management software is used for collecting, managing, saving, and retrieving medical information for the patients, and for creating reports for the patients. Computers in dentistry were first used to record dental archives as an alternative of paper dental documentation. Later, the term "computer based dental documentation" was replaced with the term electronic patient record (EPR) since the latter better describes the method and the environment in which the patient record is being managed.

The American Dental Association (ADA) created specification number 1000 and number 1004.

Web-based dental patients records management software has been proposed. The web-based records save the information for the patients in a central web server instead in the computer in the dental office.

=== Dental Treatment Planning Software ===
The usage of computer technologies for taking clinical decisions for the treatment of dental patients started at the end of the 1970s. The expert systems designed to enhance the treatment process, by providing the dental practitioner with a treatment plan are known as dental expert systems software. Today for more appropriate definition is supposed to be decision support systems, or DSS, and knowledge based systems (KBS). Such software products are designed for therapeutic dentistry, or prosthodontics.

=== Dental Internet and Ethernet Communication Software ===
Telecommunication technologies found application in the medicine in the 1950s, which led to the defining of a new term: telemedicine. In 1997, Cook first used the term "teledentistry" and defines it as the practice to be used videoconference technologies for diagnosis placement or consultations for the treatment from destination. Different variations of medical and dental data interchange using internet are developed.

=== Computer-Aided Dental Education ===
Computer-assisted education is an element from the remote education. The term "electronic learning" or "e-learning" defines the usage of internet and multimedia in the educational course. Schleyer describes the learning with the help of computer software as a means for overcoming the faults of the traditional forms of education. In 1997 Cook wrote about the usage of videoconference technologies by the means of their usage for dental education. Today software for computer aided dental education are made for various dental specialities: orthodontics, dental imaging, endodontics, cariesology, oral pathology, pediatric dentistry, parodontology and prosthodontics.

=== Software for Usage of Dental Instruments ===
Instruments, used in dentistry, and needing software to operate are a large number of models of digital roentgenography hardware, intraoral cameras, various diagnostic hardware products such as for early caries detection, periodontal probes, CAD/CAM systems.
