= Levita =

Levita may refer to:

People:

- Levita Adalbert (died c. 710 in Egmond), Northumbrian Anglo-Saxon missionary
- Benedict Levita, the pseudonym attached to a forged collection of capitularies that appeared in the ninth century
- Cecil Levita, KCVO, CBE, DL (1867–1953), British soldier, Chairman of the London County Council in 1928
- Elia Levita (1469–1549), Renaissance Hebrew grammarian, scholar and poet
- Ohad Levita (born 1986), Israeli footballer
- Robin de Levita (born 1959), Dutch theatre and television producer
- San Sossio Levita e Martire (275–305), Deacon of Misenum, a naval base of the Roman Empire in the Bay of Naples

Other:

- Maestro Levita, 1938 Argentine film directed by Luis César Amadori
- Levita Stadium, football stadium in Kfar Saba, Israel

== See also ==
- Evita (disambiguation)
- Levitan
- Levitha
