= CPES =

CPES may refer to:

- Central Power Engineering Service, Ministry of Power (India)
- Centre parachutiste d'entraînement spécialisé, French Army

== See also ==
- CPE (disambiguation)
