= AAEP =

The acronym AAEP may refer to:

- Advanced Aviation Education Programme; see Hong Kong Air Cadet Corps#Advanced Aviation Education Programme (AAEP) Scholarship
- American Academy of Emergency Physicians
- Argentine Association of Political Economy
- American Association of Equine Practitioners
- American Association for Emergency Psychiatry
