= Levitan =

Levitan is a surname. Notable people with the surname include:

- Avri Levitan (born 1973), Israeli violist
- Boris Levitan (1914–2004), Soviet-American mathematician
- Caleb Levitan (born 2010), South African chess player
- Dan Levitan, American businessman
- Félix Lévitan (1911–2007), Tour de France organiser
- Isaac Levitan (1860–1900), Russian painter
- Israel Levitan (1912–1982), American abstract expressionist sculptor
- Jerry Levitan (born 1954), Canadian known as "the kid who interviewed John Lennon"
- Nadav Levitan (1945–2010), Israeli film director, screenwriter, writer and songwriter
- Richard M. Levitan, American emergency medicine physician and businessperson
- Solomon Levitan (1862–1940), treasurer of Wisconsin
- Steven Levitan (born 1962), director
- Tina Levitan (1922–2014), American writer
- Yuliya Levitan (born 1973), American chess player
- Yuri Levitan (1914–1983), Soviet radio announcer
