= Raina Merchant =

American emergency medicine specialist

- Born: April 1976 (age 50); Chicago, Illinois, US

Academic background
- Education: BA, Psychobiology, 1998, Yale University; MD, 2003, University of Chicago; MPH, 2009, University of Pennsylvania

Academic work
- Institutions: Perelman School of Medicine

Raina Martha Merchant (born April 1976) is an American emergency medicine specialist, a member of the National Academy of Medicine. She is the associate vice president and director of the Center for Digital Health in Penn Medicine and associate professor of emergency medicine in the Perelman School of Medicine at the University of Pennsylvania.

== Early life and education ==
Merchant was born in April 1976 in Chicago, Illinois. She attended Kenwood Academy where she was named to the 1994 Chicago Tribune Scholar-Athlete team for tennis. Following high school, Merchant enrolled at Yale University where she completed her Bachelor of Arts degree in psychobiology in 1998. From there, she earned her medical degree at the University of Chicago and her Master's degree from the University of Pennsylvania.

== Career ==
Upon receiving her MPH, Merchant arrived at Perelman School of Medicine as a Robert Wood Johnson Foundation Clinical Scholar, eventually joining the faculty in emergency medicine in 2010. In this role, she led a city-wide informative competition where people were to locate automated external defibrillators around Philadelphia so they could be easily found in an emergency. The devices were then added onto her app, the MyHeartMap Challenge, to create a comprehensive AED map in Philadelphia. As a result of her efforts, she was selected to receive an inaugural RWJF Young Leader Award, given to "leaders ages 40 and under for their exceptional contributions to improving the health of the nation." She was also shortlisted for the Philadelphia Magazine's Be Well Philly 2014 Health Hero Challenge.

In 2013, Merchant was appointed the Director of the Social Media Lab at the Penn Medicine Center for Health Care Innovation. As the director, she was expected to "lead a program exploring ways in which new communication channels can enhance our ability to understand and improve the health and health care of patients and populations." The following year, Merchant collaborated with Charlene Wong and David Asch to conduct a three-month observational study to identify problems on Healthcare.gov that divert young adults from properly accessing the site. She also published a similar study in 2016 analyzing how Yelp reviews could assist the government in properly assessing the quality of their hospitals.

While serving in the role as an assistant professor of emergency medicine, Merchant was promoted to associate vice president for the University of Pennsylvania Health System and director of the university's Center for Digital Health. Here, she was appointed to the editorial board for JAMA and was named a National Academy of Medicine Emerging Leaders of Health and Medicine Scholars. The following year, Merchant was elected a Member of the National Academy of Medicine "for developing, deploying, evaluating, and refining novel tools and techniques to promote individual and population health."

During the COVID-19 pandemic in North America, Merchant received the Society for Academic Emergency Medicine Mid-Career Investigator Award, given to those who have "demonstrated commitment and achievement in research during the mid-stage of their academic career."
