= Robert W. Fleming =

Canadian-American healthcare executive (1928–2025)

Robert W. Fleming (March 12, 1928 – July 31, 2025) was a Canadian-American healthcare executive at the Mayo Clinic and the long-time chair of the U.S. Olympic Ice Hockey Committee. His role in helping to build the United States’s gold-medal hockey team in 1980 was cited in the 2004 film Miracle.

== Early life ==
Fleming was born in Toronto, Canada, in 1928, and completed secondary school in Winnipeg, Canada. He attended the University of Minnesota in the 1940s and played intercollegiate hockey for four years, earning a business degree from the university's Carlson School of Management in 1949.

After graduating from college, Fleming played hockey for the Rochester Mustangs in the American Amateur Hockey League for several years, during which time he became a U.S. citizen. His most productive season was as a right wing in 1951-52, when he scored 20 goals and had 21 assists in the course of 35 games. He was the team’s third-leading scorer and also ranked third in penalty minutes, with 37.

== Healthcare career ==
Fleming joined the Mayo Clinic in 1950, pushing wheelchairs and operating elevators for a few weeks before beginning a 43-year career as a business and administrative leader at the Rochester, Minnesota health-care organization. Among the positions that he held were chief administrative officer of the Mayo Clinic and vice president of the Mayo Foundation’s board of trustees.

In a 1993 article, the Rochester Post-Bulletin credited Fleming with a key role in transforming the Mayo Clinic into a nationwide institution, “sprouting branches in Scottsdale, Ariz., and Jacksonville, Fla.,” as well as “regional clinics in Wisconsin and Iowa, outreach programs at regional hospitals and a growth spurt right here in Rochester.”

Fleming also served as president of the Medical Group Management Association in 1986. He received the organization’s highest honor, the Harry J. Harwick Award, in 1990.

== U.S. Olympic hockey ==
Fleming was chairman of the U.S. Olympic Ice Hockey Committee for five Winter Olympics, in a span ranging from 1972 through 1994. This period included the 1980 Winter Olympics, when the underdog U.S. team won the gold medal at Lake Placid, N.Y., defeating a heavily favored Soviet team in the semifinals before beating Finland in the finals.

That 1980 U.S. victory was dubbed the Miracle on Ice. In 1999, the win was selected by Sports Illustrated as the top sports moment of the 20th century. As hockey committee chair, Fleming led pre-Olympics fundraising for the 1980 team and ran the search for the team’s head coach, announcing the selection of renowned team-builder Herb Brooks in late 1978.

Going into the Olympics, Fleming called the 1980 squad “far better” than previous U.S. teams, but later acknowledged doubts about how it would fare against the Soviets. In a post-Olympics speech, Fleming said that before the games, he believed “we could finish anywhere from second to eighth.”

From 1964 to 1997, Fleming was a director of USA Hockey.

In 1995 Fleming received the Lester Patrick Trophy, one of hockey’s highest honors, for outstanding service to hockey. In a newspaper interview immediately after winning the Patrick Trophy, Fleming took note of "booming" public interest in hockey and said "I'm thrilled to have been part of its growth."

== Personal life and death ==
During his college years, Fleming took summer jobs in Yellowstone National Park, where he met Janis Jensen, who was studying to become a school teacher. They married in 1949. The couple had four children and 16 grandchildren.

After Janis Fleming’s death in 1998, Fleming married Cynthia Linton Evans. Fleming retired from full-time duties at the Mayo Clinic in 1993, but continued to work with Mayo International Consulting, heading several projects in Malaysia and Southeast Asia. He died on July 31, 2025, at the age of 97.
