= Fellow of the American College of Emergency Physicians =

Fellow of the American College of Emergency Physicians, or FACEP, is a post-nominal title used to indicate that an emergency physician has passed an evaluation by the American College of Emergency Physicians (ACEP).

To become a Fellow of the American College of Emergency Physicians, a physician must be an active, life, honorary, or international member of ACEP for three consecutive years and primarily practice as an emergency physician, exclusive of training. The physician must also be board certified by the American Board of Emergency Medicine or the American Osteopathic Board of Emergency Medicine, or by the American Board of Pediatrics in pediatric emergency medicine. Each of these professional boards are member boards of the American Board of Medical Specialties.

== See also ==
- Fellowship of the College of Emergency Medicine
