= The Science of Diabetes Self-Management and Care =

- Discipline: Health Sciences
- Language: English
- Edited by: James Fain

Publication details
- Former name: The Diabetes Educator
- History: 1975–present
- Publisher: SAGE Publications (United Kingdom)
- Frequency: Bimonthly
- Impact factor: 1.792 (2014)

Standard abbreviations
- ISO 4: Sci. Diabetes Self-Manag. Care

Indexing
- ISSN: 0145-7217 (print); 1554-6063 (web)
- LCCN: 77640396
- OCLC no.: 2776215

Links
- Journal homepage; Online access; Online archive

The Science of Diabetes Self-Management and Care is a peer-reviewed academic journal that publishes papers in the field of Endocrinology. The journal's editor is James Fain, PhD, RN, BC-ADM, FAAN (University of Massachusetts-Dartmouth). It has been in publication since 1980 and until 2021 was titled The Diabetes Educator. It is currently published by SAGE Publications in association with the Association of Diabetes Care & Education Specialists.

== Scope ==
The Science of Diabetes Self-Management and Care publishes original articles on topics such as patient care and education, clinical practice and clinical research. The multidisciplinary journal takes the view of diabetes education as represented by nurses, dieticians, physicians and other professionals. The Science of Diabetes Self-Management and Care aims to serve as a reference for the science and practice of diabetes management.

== Abstracting and indexing ==
The Science of Diabetes Self-Management and Care is abstracted and indexed in Scopus. According to the Journal Citation Reports, its 2014 impact factor is 1.792, ranking it 98 out of 128 journals in the category ‘Endocrinology & Metabolism’. and ranking it 52 out of 145 journals in the category ‘Public, Environmental, and Occupational Health’.
