= American Medical Group Association =

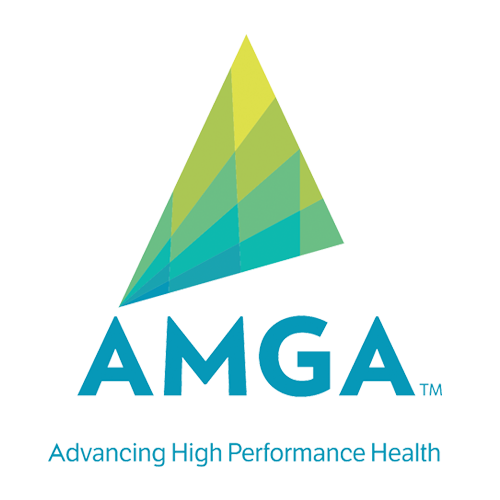
- Nickname: AMGA
- Formation: 1950; 76 years ago
- Type: Trade association
- Purpose: AMGA empowers the delivery of coordinated, patient-centered, high-quality, value-driven health care.
- Headquarters: Alexandria, Virginia, U.S.
- (CEO): Jerry Penso
- (Board Chair): Beth Averbeck
- Subsidiaries: AMGA Consulting; AMGA Foundation; AMGA Analytics, LLC
- Website: http://www.amga.org/

The American Medical Group Association (AMGA) is a non-profit trade association headquartered in Alexandria, Virginia. AMGA represents the interests of multi-specialty medical groups and integrated health systems in the United States.

== History ==
AMGA (originally a group practice association, later named as American Group Practice Association, and further named as AMGA), was founded in 1950 with the intention to uniformly represent the interests of physicians working in group practice settings. In 1974, the association was renamed the American Group Practice Association. In 1996, this group merged with the Unified Medical Group Association to form the American Medical Group Association.

AMGA Consulting publishes numerous annual surveys, including the Medical Group Compensation and Productivity Survey, which analyze compensation and productivity trends of physicians and advanced practice providers working in a medical group setting.

== Diabetes: Together 2 Goal Campaign ==
Together 2 Goal was a three-year, national campaign created by the AMGA Foundation, with the goal of measurably improving the outcome of care for patients in the United States with type 2 diabetes, by 2019. Over 100 medical groups, non-profits, health systems, and corporations, including the American Diabetes Association, American Association of Diabetes Educators, Novo Nordisk, Inc., and Geisinger Health participated in this campaign.

== Group Practice Journal ==
Group Practice Journal (GPJ) is a healthcare-based professional trade magazine, publishing six times each year. GPJ focuses on the topics of practice management, business operations, executive leadership, public policy, information technology & cybersecurity and finance. GPJ relies heavily on crowd-sourced content.

== See also ==
- Managed Care
- Group Medical practice in the United States
- Integrated Care
