= Society for Academic Emergency Medicine =

Professional organization for emergency medicine academicians

The Society for Academic Emergency Medicine (SAEM) is a professional organization for emergency medicine academicians. It is headquartered in Des Plaines, Illinois.

== History ==
SAEM was created in 1989 through the merger of two academic groups, the University Association for Emergency Medicine (UAEM), and the Society of Teachers of Emergency Medicine (STEM). UAEM, which focused on research in emergency medicine, and STEM, which emphasized emergency medicine education, “decided to merge when it became apparent to both groups that education and research were vitally linked.” Academic Emergency Medicine is the official journal of SAEM, and has been published since 1994. The journal publishes information relevant to the practice, educational advancements, and investigation of emergency medicine.

== See also ==
- American College of Emergency Physicians
- American Academy of Emergency Medicine
- American College of Osteopathic Emergency Physicians
