= Emergency physician =

Physician specialized in emergency medicine

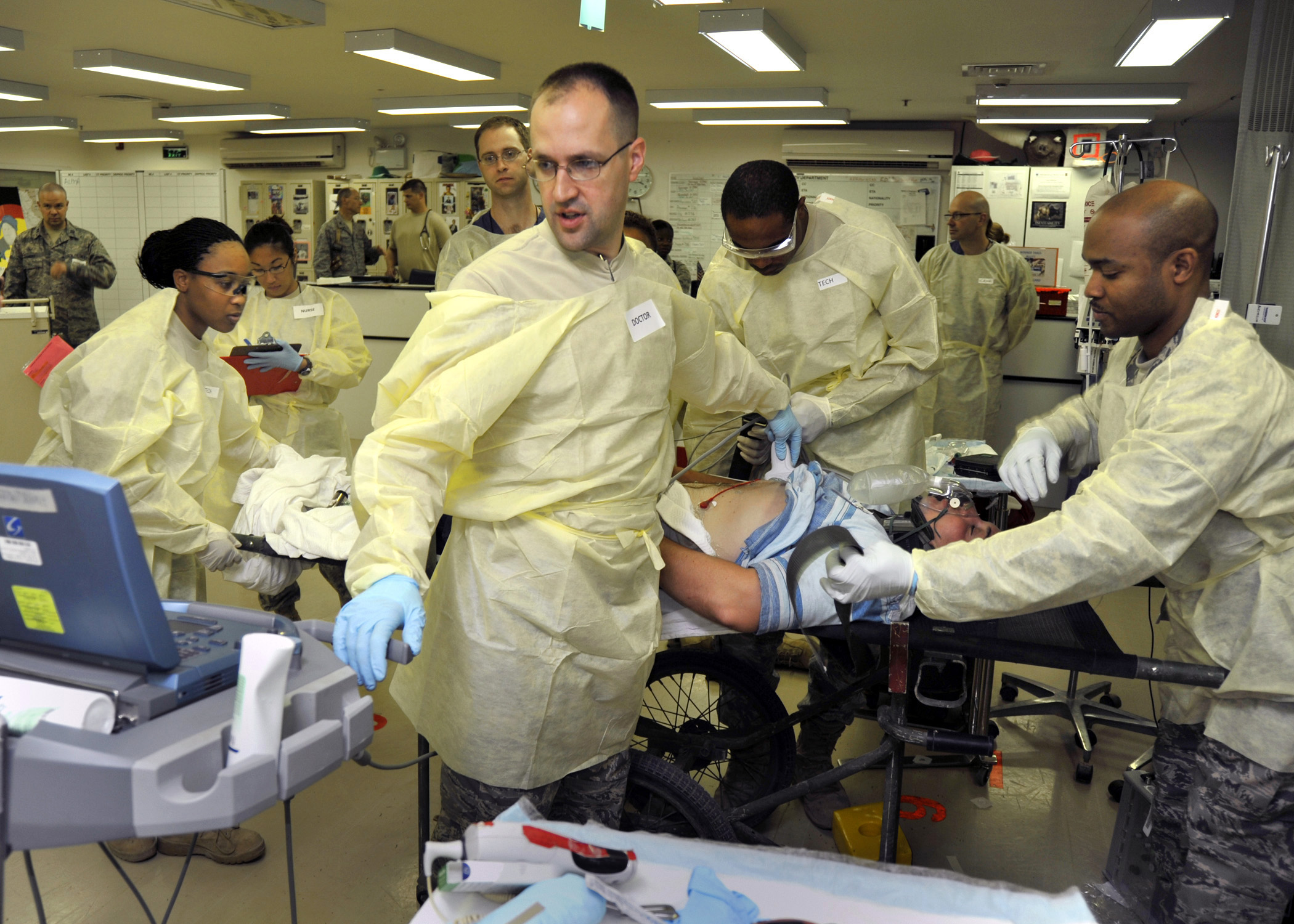
- Emergency medicine simulation

Occupation
- Occupation type: Specialty
- Activity sectors: Medicine

Description
- Education required: Doctor of Medicine, Doctor of Osteopathic Medicine
- Fields of employment: Hospitals, Clinics, Helicopter Emergency Medical Service

An emergency physician is a physician who specializes in emergency medicine. They typically work in the emergency department of a hospital and provide care to patients requiring urgent medical attention. Their scope of practice includes advanced cardiac life support (or advanced life support in Europe), resuscitation, trauma care (such as treatment of fractures and soft tissue injuries), and management of other life-threatening conditions. Alternative titles for this role include emergency medicine physician, emergentologist, ER physician, or ER doctor (with ER standing for an emergency room, primarily used in the United States).

In some European countries (e.g. Germany, Belgium, Poland, Austria, Denmark and Sweden), emergency physicians or anaesthetists are also part of the emergency medical service. They are dispatched together with emergency medical technicians and paramedics in cases of potentially life-threatening situations such as serious accident or injury, unconsciousness, heart attack, cardiac arrest, stroke, anaphylaxis, or drug overdose. In the United States, emergency physicians are mostly hospital-based, but also work on air ambulances and mobile intensive care units.

Patients who are brought in the emergency department are usually sent to triage first. The patient may be triaged by an emergency physician, a paramedic, or a nurse; in the United States, triage is usually performed by a registered nurse.The Emergency department is full of ER providers who also engage in regular continuing education to stay current with new clinical guidelines and developments in emergency medicine and patient care. Common responsibilities include reviewing diagnostic tests, like labs, CT scans, and X-rays. They also manage airway complications, perform complex procedures and initiate care for severe infections or acute neurological problems. In many hospitals worldwide emergency physicians also participate in educating medical students or residents during their shifts, helping maintain consistent standards of practice within the emergency department. Emergency medicine is a different breed, these residents and physicians have short hour shifts compared to other specialties, working usually 8 hour shifts compared to an admitting doctor who may work 12 hours or more. If the patient requires admission to the hospital, another physician, such as an internal medicine physician, cardiologist, or neurologist takes over from the emergency physician.

== Training in the United States ==
The standard training route of emergency physicians in the United States is four years of college, four years of an approved medical school, and then a three- or four-year residency in emergency medicine. After completion of residency it is common for American emergency physicians to work in a hospital's emergency department and take the board certification necessary to become certified in emergency medicine. This includes a 300+ question written exam followed by an oral examination.

== Role in healthcare ==
Emergency physicians in the United States typically work in emergency departments. Patients come in for a variety of reasons, including severe, life-threatening complaints such as strokes and heart attacks, potentially life-threatening complaints like severe abdominal pain, and less severe complaints such as mild injuries. The emergency physician is expected to oversee their care, rule out life-threatening diseases, stabilize the patient if necessary, and decide if the patient needs to be admitted to the hospital for further care or discharged home to follow up as an outpatient. Emergency physicians work with a large number of other professionals, including physician assistants/nurse practitioners, registered nurses, pharmacists, respiratory therapists, medical technicians, medical scribes, and more. For more information on what the practice of an emergency physician looks like, see Emergency medicine.

== Fellowship ==
Some additional training paths after becoming an emergency physician include:

- Toxicology
- Wilderness medicine
- Emergency ultrasound
- Trauma and/or critical care
- Sports medicine
- Pediatric emergency medicine
- Medical education
- International emergency medicine
- Hyperbaric and undersea medicine
- Emergency medical services (EMS) and disaster medicine
- Aerospace medicine

These training paths are recognized by the American Academy of Emergency Medicine and are anywhere from 1–2 years in length.

== See also ==
- Ambulance
- American College of Osteopathic Emergency Physicians
- Emergency department
- Emergency medical services
- Emergency medicine
- Fellow of American College of Emergency Physicians - professional certification for emergency physicians
- Primary care physician
