= Annals of Emergency Medicine =

- Discipline: None
- Language: English
- Edited by: Donald M. Yealy, MD

Publication details
- Former name: Journal of the American College of Emergency Physicians
- History: 1972–present
- Publisher: Elsevier on behalf of the American College of Emergency Physicians (United States)
- Frequency: Monthly
- Impact factor: 6.762 (2021)

Standard abbreviations
- ISO 4: Ann. Emerg. Med.

Indexing
- CODEN: AEMED3
- ISSN: 0196-0644
- LCCN: 80643758
- OCLC no.: 5729547

Links
- Journal homepage; Online access; Journal page at publisher's website

The Annals of Emergency Medicine is a monthly peer-reviewed medical journal covering all aspects of emergency medicine care. It is the official journal of the American College of Emergency Physicians (ACEP) and is published on their behalf by Elsevier. The editor-in-chief is Donald M. Yeally (University of Pittsburgh). It was established in 1972 as the Journal of the American College of Emergency Physicians and obtained its current title in 1980.

== Abstracting and indexing ==
This journal is abstracted and indexed in:

- CINAHL
- Scopus
- Science Citation Index
- Current Contents/Clinical Medicine
- Index Medicus/MEDLINE/PubMed

According to the Journal Citation Reports, the journal has a 2021 impact factor of 6.762, ranking it first out of 32 journals in the category "Emergency Medicine". In 2009, the BioMedical & Life Sciences Division of the Special Libraries Association elected it to their list of the 100 most influential biomedical journals of the past century.

== See also ==
- List of medical journals
