= American Osteopathic Board of Emergency Medicine =

Certifying organization

- Abbreviation: AOBEM
- Formation: 1980
- Type: Professional
- Headquarters: Chicago, IL
- Coordinates: 41.98771°N 87.84565°W
- Chair: Eric Appelbaum, DO
- Vice Chair: Bradley Chappell, DO
- Secretary: Christopher Zabbo, DO
- Website: aobem.org

The American Osteopathic Board of Emergency Medicine (AOBEM) is an organization that provides board certification to qualified Doctors of Osteopathic Medicine who specialize in the medical and surgical treatment of acutely ill patients with advanced cardiac life support, trauma, and the management of other life-threatening medical issues (emergency physicians). The AOBEM is one of 18 medical specialty certifying boards of the American Osteopathic Association Bureau of Osteopathic Specialists approved by the American Osteopathic Association (AOA).

As of December 2014, 2,583 osteopathic emergency physicians held active certification with the AOBEM.

== Board certification ==
Board certification is available to osteopathic emergency physicians who have completed an AOA-approved residency in emergency medicine and completed the required clinical, oral, and written examinations. Candidates for certification that applied for entry into the certification pathway after September 1, 2013 must only complete the written (Part I) and oral (Part II) examinations.

Osteopathic emergency medicine physicians may receive Subspecialty Certification (formerly Certification of Added Qualifications) in the following areas:

- Emergency Medical Services
- Medical Toxicology
- Sports Medicine
- Undersea and Hyperbaric Medicine
- Hospice and Palliative Medicine
- Critical Care Medicine
- Surgical Critical Care

== See also ==
- American Board of Emergency Medicine
- American College of Osteopathic Emergency Physicians
- AOA Bureau of Osteopathic Specialists
