= Medical Group Management Association =

The Medical Group Management Association is an association for professionals who lead medical practices in the United States.

== Overview ==
The Medical Group Management Association (MGMA) is the oldest and largest membership organization representing group practice administration. MGMA's membership consists of over 60,000 medical practice administrators, executives, and leaders, representing more than 15,000 organizations of various sizes, types, structures, and specialties. MGMA's members manage and lead practices where more than 350,000 physicians work.

The association advocates for medical organizations in national politics.

The association also provides resources to its members, including educational materials, certifications, networking events, benchmarking data, and access to industry experts.

The MGMA also operates three related organizations:

- The American College of Medical Practice Executives (ACMPE) sets standards for MGMA.
- The MGMA Center for Research is a 501(c)(3) organization that conducts research to advance medical group management.
- MGMA Services Inc. is a wholly owned, for-profit subsidiary of MGMA.

== History ==
The association started as the National Association of Clinic Managers, which met for the first time in Madison, Wisconsin in 1926 to discuss the challenges of managing medical group practices. At this first meeting, attendees agreed to conduct a confidential survey of financial data from 21 clinics and publish the results the following year. This survey provided information on clinic organization and processes as well as accounting methods and collection percentages, and established metrics that are still used today.

Early meetings focused on sharing information and best practices among medical group administrators. Some topics discussed included medical records, business management, physician contracts, and statistical information. The organization began to formalize in 1934 with the discussion of forming an official association and again in 1944 with the establishment of bylaws, committees, and annual dues.

The name was changed to the Medical Group Management Association in 1963.

As the MGMA grew, it began to play a more active role in collecting and disseminating data on medical group practices. The MGMA also began to offer educational programs and resources to its members. In 1973, the Center for Research in Ambulatory Health Care Administration (CRAHCA) was formed to conduct research and provide training on topics related to medical group management.

In 1976, the W.K. Kellogg Foundation provided a grant to CRAHCA to develop a chart of accounts specifically for medical group practices. This chart of accounts was published in the book Practical Financial Management for Medical Groups and has been updated several times since then. The MGMA's chart of accounts has helped medical groups to better understand their costs, benchmark against their peers, and improve their financial performance.
