= American Academy of Emergency Medicine =

- Abbreviation: AAEM
- Formation: 1993
- Headquarters: Milwaukee, WI
- Region served: United States of America
- Members: 8,000+
- President: Jonathan Jones, MD FAAEM
- Vice President: Robert E. O'Connor, MD
- Main organ: Journal of Emergency Medicine
- Affiliations: AAEM Resident and Student Association
- Website: aaem.org

The American Academy of Emergency Medicine (AAEM) is a nonprofit professional medical association of emergency medicine physicians. It was formed in 1993, and is based out of Milwaukee, Wisconsin. Fellows use the post-nominal letters FAAEM.

AAEM was established to promote fair and equitable practice environments necessary to allow emergency physicians to deliver the highest quality of patient care.

Active membership is open to all physicians who have completed an emergency medicine residency approved by either the Accreditation Council for Graduate Medical Education or American Osteopathic Association. The association is also affiliated with the American Academy of Emergency Medicine/Resident and Student Association.

AAEM works cooperatively alongside the American College of Emergency Physicians and the American College of Osteopathic Emergency Physicians when the interests of emergency medicine call for a united front.
