= Carbon paste electrode =

A carbon-paste electrode (CPE) is made from a mixture of conducting graphite powder and a pasting liquid. These electrodes are simple to make and offer an easily renewable surface for electron exchange. Carbon paste electrodes belong to a special group of heterogeneous carbon electrodes. These electrodes are widely used mainly for voltammetric measurements; however, carbon paste-based sensors are also applicable in coulometry (both amperometry and potentiometry).

== Advantages ==
In general, CPEs are popular because carbon pastes are easily obtainable at minimal costs and are especially suitable for preparing an electrode material modified with admixtures of other compounds thus giving the electrode certain pre-determined properties. Electrodes made in this way are highly selective sensors for both inorganic and organic electrochemistry. Carbon paste, glassy carbon paste, glassy carbon etc. electrodes when modified are termed chemically modified electrodes. Chemically modified electrodes have been employed for the analysis of inorganic and organic species.

== Disadvantages ==
The biggest disadvantage of CPEs, which limits their applicability in practical analysis, is that success in working with carbon paste-based electrodes depends on the experience of the user. While this is true for any type of solid electrodes, CPEs are rather an exceptional case. In contrast to commercially available solid electrodes for which basic electrochemical characteristics are comparable for almost all products from each manufacturer, each carbon paste unit is an individual, where the physical, chemical and electrochemical properties may differ from one preparation to another. For this reason each probe must be calibrated individually. While this may not be an issue in a research environment, it would be a considerable burden in production service.
