= Academic Emergency Medicine =

- Discipline: Emergency medicine
- Language: English

Publication details
- History: 1994–present
- Publisher: Wiley
- Frequency: Monthly
- Impact factor: 3.2 (2024)

Standard abbreviations
- ISO 4: Acad. Emerg. Med.

Indexing
- CODEN: AEMEF5
- ISSN: 1069-6563 (print); 1553-2712 (web)
- OCLC no.: 45268302

Links
- Journal homepage

Academic Emergency Medicine is a monthly peer-reviewed medical journal published by Wiley on behalf of the Society for Academic Emergency Medicine. The editor in chief is Jeffrey A. Kline, MD. Coverage includes basic science, clinical research, education information, and clinical practice related to emergency medicine.

== Abstracting and indexing ==
This journal is indexed by the following services:

- Abstracts in Anthropology
- Current Contents/ Clinical Medicine
- Embase
- MEDLINE/Index Medicus
- Science Citation Index Expanded

According to the Journal Citation Reports, the journal has a 2024 impact factor of 3.2.
