= Hospital Quality Incentive Demonstration =

Research project in the United States

Launched in October 2003, the Hospital Quality Incentive Demonstration (HQID) pay-for-performance project was designed to determine if economic incentives to hospitals were effective at improving the quality of inpatient care. Approximately 250 hospitals—small/large, urban/rural, teaching/non-teaching facilities—across 36 U.S. states participated in the demonstration.

== Results ==
Over the first three years of the project (2003–2006), participating hospitals raised overall quality by an average of 15.8 percent based on their delivery of 30 nationally standardized and widely accepted care measures to patients in these five clinical areas:

- acute myocardial infarction (AMI/heart attack)
- coronary artery bypass graft (CABG)
- heart failure (HF)
- pneumonia (PN)
- hip and knee replacement (HK)

Additional research using the Hospital Compare dataset for April 2006 to March 2007 showed that HQID participants scored on average 7.48 percentage points higher (91.49 percent to 84.01 percent) than non-participants when evaluating 19 common Hospital Compare measures.
