= Emergency Medicine Residents' Association =

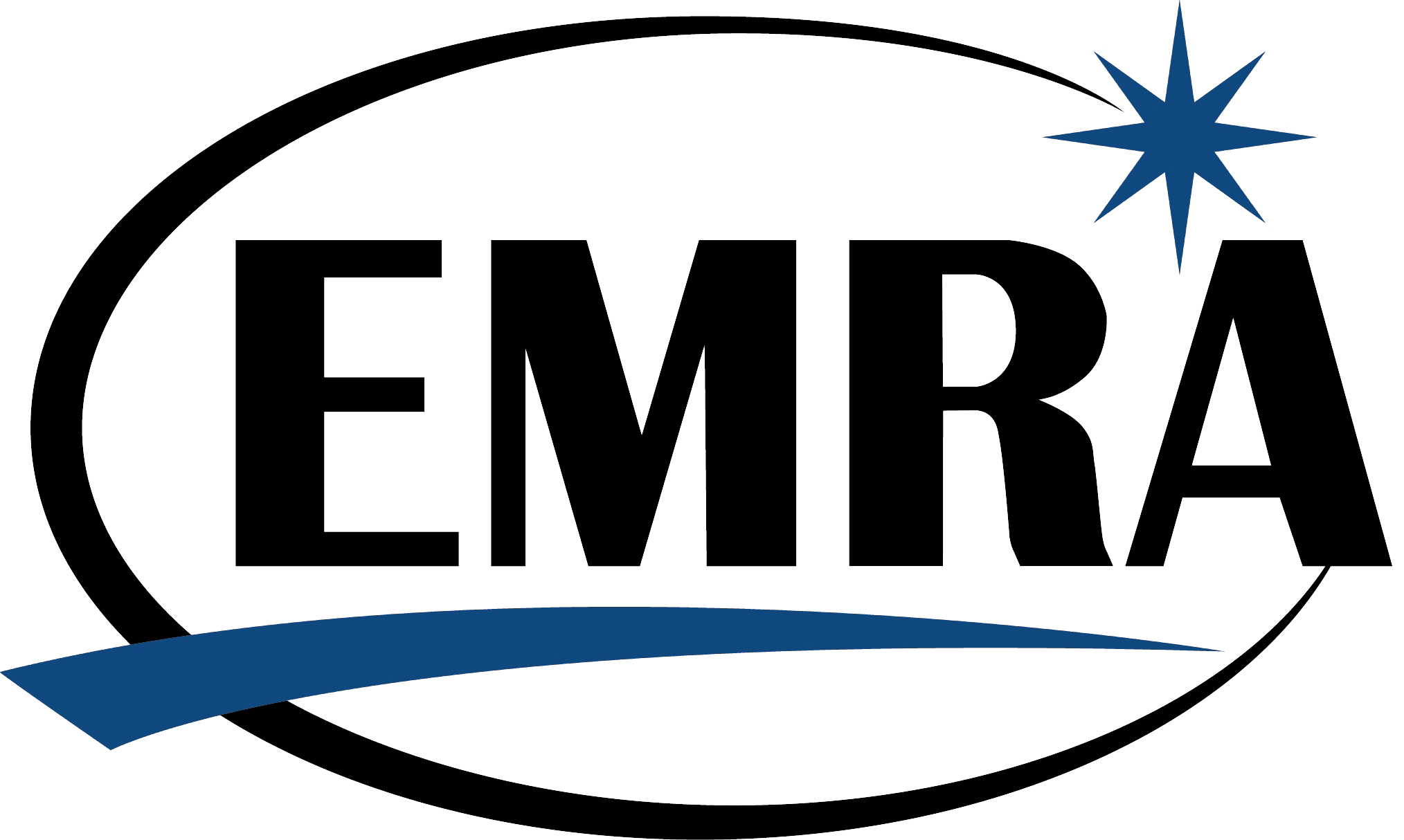
- Abbreviation: EMRA
- Formation: 1974
- Founder: Joseph Waeckerle
- Type: professional association
- Purpose: To represent emergency medicine physicians-in-training
- Headquarters: Irving, Texas
- Location: United States
- Members: 11,888 as of June 2013
- Website: www.emra.org

The Emergency Medicine Residents' Association (EMRA) is a professional organization that represents over 90% of resident physicians training in emergency medicine in the United States. EMRA is both the largest and the oldest independent medical resident group in the world. Its members include medical students, interns, residents, fellows, and alumni who are training in emergency medicine residencies in the United States and abroad. In 2023, approximately 20,400 physicians and medical students were members, including about 11,000 resident physician members. Generally, members are required to be residents or fellows in good standing with an accredited emergency medicine residency training program, medical students planning to apply to emergency medicine residency, or alumni physician members who have completed their training.

EMRA's mission is to “help emergency medicine physicians-in-training become the best doctors and leaders they can be and shape emergency medicine into the best specialty it can be.” It was founded in 1974, and holds its administrative headquarters in Dallas, Texas.
