= Charged-particle equilibrium =

In radiological physics, charged-particle equilibrium (CPE) occurs when the number of charged particles leaving a volume is equal to the number entering, for each energy and type of particle. When CPE exists in an irradiated medium, the absorbed dose in the volume is equal to the collision kerma.

In order for this to occur, energy is needed.
