= Association of Diabetes Care and Education Specialists =

Multidisciplinary membership organization

The Association of Diabetes Care & Education Specialists (formerly American Association of Diabetes Educators, or AADE) is a multidisciplinary membership organization for healthcare professionals who specialize in teaching patients about diabetes and how to self-manage the disease.

ADCES was founded in 1973 as the American Association of Diabetes Educators. In January 2020, the organization rebranded to its current name, Association of Diabetes Care and Education Specialists.

ADCES represents and supports diabetes educators by providing members with the resources to stay abreast of the current research, methods and trends in the field and by offering opportunities to network and collaborate with other healthcare professionals.

== Publications ==
- The Science of Diabetes Self-Management and Care (ISSN 2635-0106), formerly The Diabetes Educator
- ADCES in Practice (ISSN 2633-559X), formerly AADE in Practice

== See also ==
- Certified diabetes educator
- Advanced Diabetes Management Certification
