= Tina Levitan =

American writer

- Born: December 19, 1922; Boston, Massachusetts, U.S.
- Died: June 9, 2014 (aged 91); New York, New York, U.S.
- Education: Hunter College, Herzliah Hebrew Teachers Seminary
- Occupation: Writer
- Writing career
- Language: English, Hebrew
- Years active: 1952–1996
- Subject: Jewish history
- Notable awards: Jane Fischel Memorial Prize for the Best Essay on the "Philosophy of Traditional Judaism"

Tina Nellie Levitan (December 19, 1922 – June 9, 2014) was an American writer, who wrote mainly about topics related to Jewish history.

== Early life ==
Levitan was born in Boston, Massachusetts, and attended the Boston Hebrew College Prozdor (High School). At age 17, she moved to Brooklyn, New York. with her parents. She earned a Bachelor of Arts degree from Hunter College of the City University of New York in 1944, winning the Jane Fischel Memorial Prize for the Best Essay on the "Philosophy of Traditional Judaism". She also received a Bachelor of Education degree from the Herzliah Hebrew Teachers Seminary in New York.

== Writer and columnist ==
Levitan’s books consistently explored the intersection of some aspect of history, usually American history, with Judaism.

In 1967, when preparing The Laureates: Jewish Winners of the Nobel Prize, Levitan wrote to Richard Feynman, who had been awarded the Nobel Prize in Physics in 1965, requesting a biographical sketch and a black and white photograph, as he was listed as a Jewish Nobel Prize winner. Feynman wrote back saying that his inclusion in the book would be inappropriate because at the age of 13, he had converted to non-religious views. When she wrote a follow-up letter saying that she intended to include not only professing Jews but also those of Jewish origins because “they usually have inherited their valuable heredity elements and talents from their people,” he replied that “it is evil and dangerous to maintain… that there is a true Jewish race or specific Jewish hereditary character… to select for approbation the peculiar elements that come from some supposedly Jewish heredity is to open the door to all kinds of nonsense on racial theory… such theoretical views were used by Hitler.” Feynman was not included in the book.

Levitan also lectured frequently, and had over 450 articles and reviews on American Jewish history and Jewish life published in both scholarly and popular Jewish journals, including a weekly column on Jewish history in The Jewish Press from 1974 to 1977.

She was elected to the Hunter College Hall of Fame in 1979.

Levitan died in New York City, New York, on June 9, 2014.

== Works ==
- The Firsts of American Jewish History, 1492-1951, Charuth Press (Brooklyn, N.Y.), 1952, 174 pages.
- The Firsts of American Jewish History, Charuth Press (Brooklyn, N.Y.), 1957, 285 pages.
- The Laureates: Jewish Winners of the Nobel prize, Twayne Publishers (New York, N.Y.), 1960, 236 pages.
- Islands of Compassion: A History of the Jewish Hospitals of New York, Twayne Publishers (New York, N.Y.), 1964, 304 pages.
- Beolam Hechadash ("In the New World," in Hebrew), Board of Jewish Education of New York, 1968.
- Jews in American Life – From 1492 to the Space Age, Hebrew Publishing Company (New York, N.Y.), 1969, 253 pages. ISBN 978-0884828914.
- Viewpoints on Science and Judaism, Board of Jewish Education of New York, 1978 (editor, 26 essays)
- First Facts in American Jewish History: From 1492 to the Present, Jason Aronson (Northvale, N.J.) 1996, 418 pages. ISBN 978-1568218953.
