= Pediatric emergency medicine =

Pediatric emergency medicine (PEM) is a medical subspecialty of both pediatrics and emergency medicine. It involves the care of undifferentiated, unscheduled children with acute illnesses or injuries that require immediate medical attention. While not usually providing long-term or continuing care, pediatric emergency doctors undertake the necessary investigations and interventions to diagnose patients in the acute phase, to liaise with physicians from other specialities, and to resuscitate and stabilize children who are seriously ill or injured. Pediatric emergency physicians generally practice in hospital emergency departments.

== Training ==
=== United States ===
Pediatric emergency physicians in the United States take one of two routes of training; one can do a pediatrics residency (3 years) followed by a pediatric emergency fellowship (3 years), or an emergency medicine residency (3–4 years) followed by a pediatric emergency fellowship (2 years). Majority of practicing PEM doctors take the former route. There are currently 50+ PEM fellowship programs with 177 total spots in the United States.

A survey published in 2009 found that PEM physicians report higher career satisfaction than doctors in all other specialties. Per doximity, pediatric emergency physicians in the U.S. make an average of $273,683 yearly. They also work fewer hours than do other subspecialists.

=== Canada ===
In Canada, aspiring paediatric emergency physicians must first complete a Doctor of Medicine (M.D.) and then apply to a paediatrics or emergency medicine residency program, both of which last on average five years. Residents, however, will not complete the entire residency program as they will, upon starting their final year of residency, switch to the other residency program in order to receive training in both specialties. This switch usually extends the length of the residency by a few years. As such, the residency program in its entirety usually has a length of about 6 years and leads to certification by the Royal College of Physicians and Surgeons of Canada.

In the 2010s, many institutions, such as McGill University, Université de Montréal, Université de Sherbrooke, and Université Laval in the province of Quebec, offered this residency program in collaboration with various hospital training centres. Other Canadian universities, such as University of Toronto, University of Ottawa, University of Calgary, University of Saskatchewan, and University of British Columbia, also offer post-graduate medical programs in emergency medicine and paediatrics.

Australia and New Zealand

PEM training in Australia and New Zealand can be approached from either the Royal Australasian College of Physicians or the Australasian College for Emergency Medicine. The overlap in pathways involves core training in general pediatrics, pediatric emergency medicine, adult emergency medicine and pediatric intensive care.
