= American College of Medical Practice Executives =

The American College of Medical Practice Executives (ACMPE), established in 1956, supports and promotes the personal and professional growth of leaders to advance the medical practice management profession and is the certification and standard-setting body of the Medical Group Management Association (MGMA). Both are headquartered in Englewood, Colo. Nearly 6,000 members strong, ACMPE developed the standard-setting Body of Knowledge for Medical Practice Management. It grants nationally recognized certification and fellowship designations to the most accomplished medical practice executives and leaders in the profession.

Members of the ACMPE may obtain recognition for their knowledge and experience by becoming Certified Medical Practice Executives (CMPE) or a Fellow of the American College of Medical Practice Executives (FACMPE). Certification (CMPE) requires candidates who have the requisite two years of relevant experience to demonstrate their proficiency through objective and essay examinations and presentations that include content from the Body of Knowledge for Medical Practice Management. Fellowship (FACMPE) requires the submission of a professional paper or series of case studies by members who have already earned the CMPE designation. Both the CMPE and FACMPE status require the maintenance of continuing education credit hours.

== MGMA ==
The Medical Group Management Association defines and advances the medical practice management profession and advocates on its behalf. Its resources help the American College of Medical Practice Executives support and promote the professional growth of leaders.
