= American Board of Emergency Medicine =

American medical association

The American Board of Emergency Medicine (ABEM) is one of 24 medical specialty certification boards recognized by the American Board of Medical Specialties. ABEM is a physician-led, non-profit independent organization that certifies residency trained emergency medicine physicians who pass both written and certifying examinations and maintain their certification on a five year cycle. It was originally funded by the American College of Emergency Physicians (ACEP) in 1968 and received specialty board approval in 1979 to become the 23rd medical specialty.

== History ==
The development of Emergency Medicine as a nationally recognized medical specialty began in the 1960s when the number of patients requiring emergency care was increasing. In 1960, emergency medicine was not a recognized medical specialty and emergency rooms were run by on-call physicians of varying specialties. With the goal of advancing and advocating for the specialty of Emergency Medicine, eight physicians in Lansing, Michigan founded the American College of Emergency Physicians (ACEP) on August 16, 1968. Their initial goals included attaining specialty board status and in 1976 they funded the creation of the American Board of Emergency Medicine (ABEM).

ABEM applied for primary board status from the American Board of Medical Specialties (ABMS) in 1976; their application was sent to the Liaison Committee for Specialty Boards, which recommended specialty board approval. However, the ABMS rejected this initial application. A series of discussions between representatives of other specialty boards resulted in a recommendation for a second application to be submitted, this time asking for approval of a conjoined board rather than primary board status.

This second application was approved by the AMA Council on Medical Education and the ABMS, leading to Emergency Medicine being recognized as the 23rd medical specialty in the U.S. in 1979. Conjoined board approval meant that ABEM was required to include other specialties on the board, but on September 21, 1989, after a second rejection in May, the ABMS voted unanimously to grant approval for primary board status and ABEM became a member board of ABMS. From this point forward, ABEM was free to develop subspecialty certifications such as pediatric emergency medicine, sports medicine, and medical toxicology.

== Certifications ==
Along with certification of Emergency Medicine physicians, ABEM also offers subspecialty certifications in:

- Anesthesiology Critical Care Medicine
- Emergency Medical Services
- Health Care Administration, Leadership, and Management
- Hospice and Palliative Medicine
- Internal Medicine – Critical Care Medicine
- Medical Toxicology
- Neurocritical Care
- Pain Medicine
- Pediatric Emergency Medicine
- Sports Medicine
- Undersea and Hyperbaric Medicine

ABEM further offers a Focused Practice Designation in Advanced Emergency Medicine Ultrasonography (AEMUS).

== Certification Process ==
In 1980 the American Board of Emergency Medicine conducted the first certification examinations in Emergency Medicine. The initial format for the certification process was a written examination (qualifying examination (QE)) followed by an oral certifying exam (OCE). This format was decided after a pilot examination determined that multiple choice exams and oral simulated cases were able to distinguish between levels of practice and could be used to measure competency. The Qualifying exam consists of approximately 305 multiple choice questions and the oral certifying exam consists of five single-patient cases and two structured interviews. This format remained unchanged until January 2024 when ABEM announced the development of a new certifying exam, with a plan to implement it in 2026. The new certifying exam will take place at the AIME center in Raleigh, NC and will consist of two types of simulated cases: Clinical care cases and Objective Structured Clinical Examination (OSCE) cases. The Qualifying Exam will remain the same.

In order to be eligible to sit for the Qualifying Exam and Oral Certifying Exam or new Certifying Exam applicants must have graduated from an Accreditation Council for Graduate Medical Education (ACGME) or Royal College of Physicians and Surgeons of Canada (RCPSC) accredited Emergency Medicine Program or an ABEM-approved combined training program. ABEM Board certification indicates that a physician has attained the skills required to meet the highest standards and credentials in Emergency Medicine and is separate from Medical Licensure. Physicians will remain board eligible for up to five years after their graduation date.

== Continuing Certification ==
In 2000 the AMBS launched a Maintenance of Certification program requiring the Member Boards to follow a set of standards to maintain the knowledge and skills consistent with their specialty. In 2004 ABEM implemented its version of the Maintenance of Certification Program known as Emergency Medicine Continuous Certification (EMCC), which was later renamed to ABEM Maintenance of Certification. At the time of its inception, the ABEM Maintenance of Certification was based on the four core principles set by ABMS: Part I: Professional Standing; Part II: Lifelong Learning and Self Assessment (LLSA); Part III: Assessment of Cognitive Expertise (ConCert examination); and Part IV: Assessment of Practice Performance. The ConCert examination was a 205 multiple-choice question standardized exam that board certified Emergency Medicine Physicians were required to pass every 10 years to maintain certification. In November 2021, the ABMS announced changes to its standards for Continuing Certification that moved away from exams taken once every 10 year cycle, to online testing with increased flexibility. In response, ABEM launched a new continued certification process known as MyEMCert, which is composed of four online modules, and phased out the ConCert Examination in October 2022. To remain certified, the four MyEMCert modules and an improvement in medical practice activity must be completed every 5 years.

== See also ==
- American Board of Medical Specialties
- American Osteopathic Board of Emergency Medicine
- Board of Certification in Emergency Medicine
