= Group medical practice in the United States =

Group medical practices practice medicine by physicians who share resources.

There are approximately 230,187 physician practices in the United States. Among the physician practices, 16.5% had only one office-based physician in 2016. Physician group practices with 2-4 physicians make up 22.3% of physician offices in the United States, 19.8% have 5-10 physicians, 12.1% have 11-24 physicians, 6.3% have 25–49, and the remaining 13.5% have 50 or more physicians.

In recent years, many small or solo practitioners have come together to form larger specialty groups because of managed care.

== Formal definition ==
The Centers for Medicare and Medicaid Services (CMS) changed the definition of "group practice" in its 2012 physician fee schedule to mean 25 or more eligible professionals in the same practice.
