= American Association for Emergency Psychiatry =

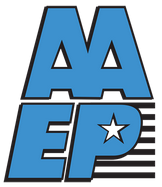
- Abbreviation: AAEP
- Purpose: emergency psychiatry
- Region served: United States
- Website: https://www.emergencypsychiatry.org/

The American Association for Emergency Psychiatry (AAEP) is a professional association for emergency psychiatry healthcare professionals in the United States. AAEP hosts national conferences in the field of emergency psychiatry, offering continuing education credit for its membership. AAEP publishes the journal, Emergency Psychiatry, which publishes scientific manuscripts and book reviews. AAEP maintains a members-only discussion board, which Psychiatric Times described as having "lively debates about best practices and ethical issues." AAEP hosts a job-search service for open job postings for healthcare positions in psychiatry. AAEP has published consensus guidelines for the field of emergency psychiatry.

== Clinical practice guidelines ==
AAEP's Project BETA (Best practices in Evaluation and Treatment of Agitation) is a set of clinical practice guidelines designed to address the treatment of agitation in the acute, emergency psychiatric setting. Published in February 2012, the guidelines have been described by Dr. Scott L. Zeller, MD, AAEP Past President, as being "more humane, patient-centered interventions." The guidelines rely less upon restraint techniques, and more upon de-escalation techniques that encourage patient buy-in to the management of their agitation.
