= American College of Osteopathic Emergency Physicians =

US professional organization

- Abbreviation: ACOEP
- Formation: 1975
- Type: Professional
- Headquarters: Chicago, IL
- President: Christine F. Giesa, D.O., ACOEP-D
- President-elect: Robert E. Suter, D.O., M.H.A, FACOEP-D
- Secretary: G. Joseph Beirne, D.O., FACOEP
- Treasurer: Timothy Cheslock, D.O., FACOEP
- Website: acoep.org

The American College of Osteopathic Emergency Physicians (ACOEP) is a professional organization of emergency medicine physicians. It was founded in 1975. Active membership is open only to osteopathic (D.O.) medical physicians who have practiced emergency medicine for the past three years and/or have completed an emergency medicine residency approved by the American Osteopathic Association (AOA) or Accreditation Council for Graduate Medical Education (ACGME). Fellows use the designation FACOEP. As of November 2017, ACOEP had over 5,000 members.

== See also ==
- American Osteopathic Board of Emergency Medicine
