= American College of Emergency Physicians =

American professional organization of emergency medical physicians

- Abbreviation: ACEP
- Formation: 1968
- Headquarters: Irving, Texas
- Region served: United States of America
- Members: >38,000 members (2020)
- President: L. Anthony Cirillo
- Publication: Annals of Emergency Medicine
- Website: www.acep.org

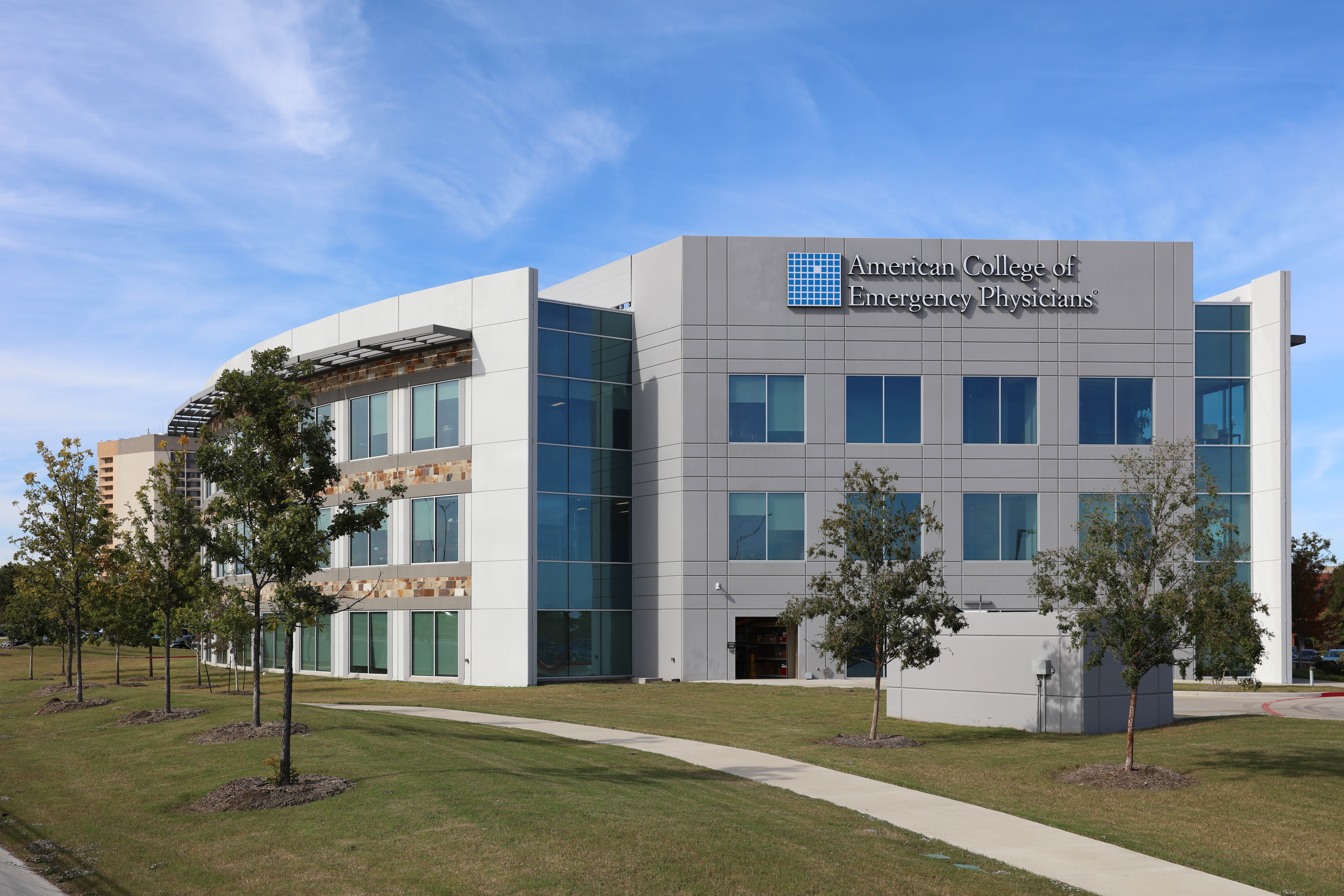
American College of Emergency Physicians

The American College of Emergency Physicians (ACEP) is a professional organization of emergency medicine physicians in the United States. ACEP publishes the Annals of Emergency Medicine and the Journal of the American College of Emergency Physicians Open (JACEP Open).

ACEP is a partner of the National Foundation for Infectious Diseases (NFID).

== History ==
The organization was founded August 16, 1968, by eight physicians in Lansing, Michigan. ACEP established the American Board of Emergency Medicine (ABEM) in 1976.

=== COVID-19 ===
During the COVID-19 pandemic, ACEP participated in a number of efforts to promote the uptake and acceptance of COVID-19 vaccines, including as a participant in the COVID-19 Vaccine Education and Equity Project led by the Alliance for Aging Research, HealthyWomen and the National Caucus and Center on Black Aging.

In early 2021, ACEP received an $8,000 grant from Pfizer to fund a public service announcement on vaccine confidence. On March 19, 2021, ACEP published a joint statement in support of COVID-19 vaccines alongside the American College of Medical Toxicology and the American Academy of Emergency Medicine.

== See also ==
- American College of Osteopathic Emergency Physicians
- Academic Emergency Medicine
- Society for Academic Emergency Medicine
