= Emergency medicine =

Medical specialty

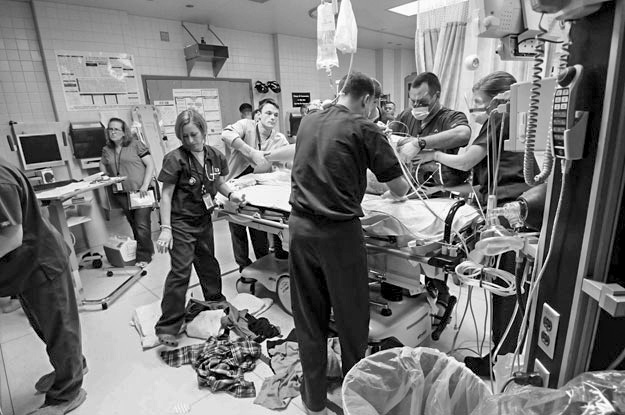
- Emergency physicians and registered nurses conducting a trauma evaluation.
- Focus: Acute illness and injury
- Subdivisions: Pediatric; Pre-hospital
- Significant diseases: Trauma; Sepsis; Burn; Acute coronary syndrome; Poisoning; Stroke; Cardiac arrest; Psychosis; Suicidal ideation and attempt; Altered mental status; Seizure
- Significant tests: Blood test; Blood gas; ECG; Ultrasound; Projection radiography; CT scan
- Specialist: Emergency physician
- Glossary: Glossary of medicine

Emergency medicine physician
Occupation
- Names: Physician
- Occupation type: Specialty
- Activity sectors: Medicine

Description
- Education required: Doctor of Medicine (M.D.); Doctor of Osteopathic medicine (D.O.); Bachelor of Medicine, Bachelor of Surgery (M.B.B.S.); Bachelor of Medicine, Bachelor of Surgery (MBChB)
- Fields of employment: Hospitals, clinics

SÖHNGEN aluminum emergency case

Emergency medicine is the medical specialty concerned with the care of illnesses or injuries requiring immediate medical attention. Emergency physicians (or "ER doctors") specialize in providing care for unscheduled and undifferentiated patients of all ages. As frontline providers, in coordination with emergency medical services, they are responsible for initiating resuscitation, stabilization, and early interventions during the acute phase of a medical condition. Emergency physicians generally practice in hospital emergency departments, pre-hospital settings via emergency medical services, and intensive care units. Still, they may also work in primary care settings such as urgent care clinics.

Sub-specialties of emergency medicine include disaster medicine, medical toxicology, point-of-care ultrasonography, critical care medicine, emergency medical services, hyperbaric medicine, sports medicine, palliative care, or aerospace medicine.

Various models for emergency medicine exist internationally. In countries following the Anglo-American model, emergency medicine initially consisted of surgeons, general practitioners, and other physicians. However, in recent decades, it has become recognized as a specialty in its own right with its training programs and academic posts, and the specialty is now a popular choice among medical students and newly qualified medical practitioners.

By contrast, in countries following the Franco-German model, the specialty does not exist, and emergency medical care is instead provided directly by anesthesiologists (for critical resuscitation), surgeons, specialists in internal medicine, pediatricians, cardiologists, or neurologists as appropriate. Emergency medicine is still evolving in developing countries, and international emergency medicine programs offer hope of improving primary emergency care where resources are limited.

== Scope ==
Emergency medicine is a medical specialty—a field of practice based on the knowledge and skills required to prevent, diagnose, and manage acute and urgent aspects of illness and injury affecting patients of all age groups with a full spectrum of undifferentiated physical and behavioural disorders. It further encompasses an understanding of the development of pre-hospital and in-hospital emergency medical systems and the skills necessary for this development.

The field of emergency medicine encompasses care involving the acute care of internal medical and surgical conditions. In many modern emergency departments, emergency physicians see many patients, treating their illnesses and arranging for disposition—either admitting them to the hospital or releasing them after treatment as necessary. They also provide episodic primary care to patients during off-hours and those who do not have primary care providers. Most patients present to emergency departments with low-acuity conditions (such as minor injuries or exacerbations of chronic disease), but a small proportion will be critically ill or injured. Therefore, the emergency physician requires broad knowledge and procedural skills, often including surgical procedures, trauma resuscitation, advanced cardiac life support and advanced airway management. They must have some of the core skills from many medical specialities—the ability to resuscitate a patient (intensive care medicine), manage a difficult airway (anesthesiology), suture a complex laceration (plastic surgery), set a fractured bone or dislocated joint (orthopaedic surgery), treat a heart attack (cardiology), manage strokes (neurology), work-up a pregnant patient with vaginal bleeding (obstetrics and gynaecology), control a patient with mania (psychiatry), stop a severe nosebleed (otolaryngology), place a chest tube (cardiothoracic surgery), and conduct and interpret x-rays and ultrasounds (radiology). This generalist approach can obviate barrier-to-care issues seen in systems without specialists in emergency medicine, where patients requiring immediate attention are instead managed from the outset by specialty doctors such as surgeons or internal physicians. However, this may lead to barriers through acute and critical care specialities disconnecting from emergency care.

Emergency medicine may separate from urgent care, which refers to primary healthcare for less emergent medical issues, but there is obvious overlap, and many emergency physicians work in urgent care settings. Emergency medicine also includes many aspects of acute primary care and shares with family medicine the uniqueness of seeing all patients regardless of age, gender or organ system. The emergency physician workforce also includes many competent physicians who have medical skills from other specialities.

Physicians specializing in emergency medicine can enter fellowships to receive credentials in subspecialties such as palliative care, critical care medicine, medical toxicology, wilderness medicine, pediatric emergency medicine, sports medicine, disaster medicine, tactical medicine, ultrasound, pain medicine, pre-hospital emergency medicine, or undersea and hyperbaric medicine.

The practice of emergency medicine is often quite different in rural areas where there are far fewer other specialities and healthcare resources. In these areas, family physicians with additional skills in emergency medicine often staff emergency departments. Rural emergency physicians may be the only health care providers in the community and require skills that include primary care and obstetrics.

=== Work patterns ===
Patterns vary by country and region. In the United States, the employment arrangement of emergency physician practices are either private (with a co-operative group of doctors staffing an emergency department under contract), institutional (physicians with or without an independent contractor relationship with the hospital), corporate (physicians with an independent contractor relationship with a third-party staffing company that services multiple emergency departments), or governmental (for example, when working within personal service military services, public health services, veterans' benefit systems or other government agencies).

In the United Kingdom, all consultants in emergency medicine work in the National Health Service, and there is little scope for private emergency practice. In other countries like Australia, New Zealand, or Turkey, emergency medicine specialists are almost always salaried employees of government health departments and work in public hospitals, with pockets of employment in private or non-government aeromedical rescue or transport services, as well as some private hospitals with emergency departments; they may be supplemented or backed by non-specialist medical officers, and visiting general practitioners. Rural emergency departments are sometimes run by general practitioners alone, sometimes with non-specialist qualifications in emergency medicine.

== History ==
During the French Revolution, after seeing the speed with which the carriages of the French flying artillery maneuvered across the battlefields, French military surgeon Dominique Jean Larrey applied the idea of ambulances, or "flying carriages", for rapid transport of wounded soldiers to a central place where medical care was more accessible and practical. Larrey operated ambulances with trained crews of drivers, corpsmen and litter-bearers and had them bring the wounded to centralized field hospitals, effectively creating a forerunner of the modern MASH units. Dominique Jean Larrey is sometimes called the Father of Emergency Medicine for his strategies during the French wars.

Emergency medicine as an independent medical specialty is relatively young. Before the 1960s and 1970s, hospital emergency departments (EDs) were generally staffed by physicians on staff at the hospital on a rotating basis, among them family physicians, general surgeons, internists, and a variety of other specialists. In many smaller emergency departments, nurses would triage patients, and physicians would be called in based on the type of injury or illness. Family physicians were often on call for the emergency department and recognized the need for dedicated emergency department coverage. Many of the pioneers of emergency medicine were family physicians and other specialists who saw a need for additional training in emergency care.

During this period, physicians began to emerge who had left their respective practices to devote their work entirely to the ED. In the UK in 1952, Maurice Ellis was appointed as the first "casualty consultant" at Leeds General Infirmary. In 1967, the Casualty Surgeons Association was co-established with Maurice Ellis as its first president. In the US, the first of such groups managed by Dr James DeWitt Mills in 1961, along with four associate physicians; Dr Chalmers A. Loughridge, Dr William Weaver, Dr John McDade, and Dr Steven Bednar, at Alexandria Hospital in Alexandria, Virginia, established 24/7 year-round emergency care, which became known as the "Alexandria Plan".

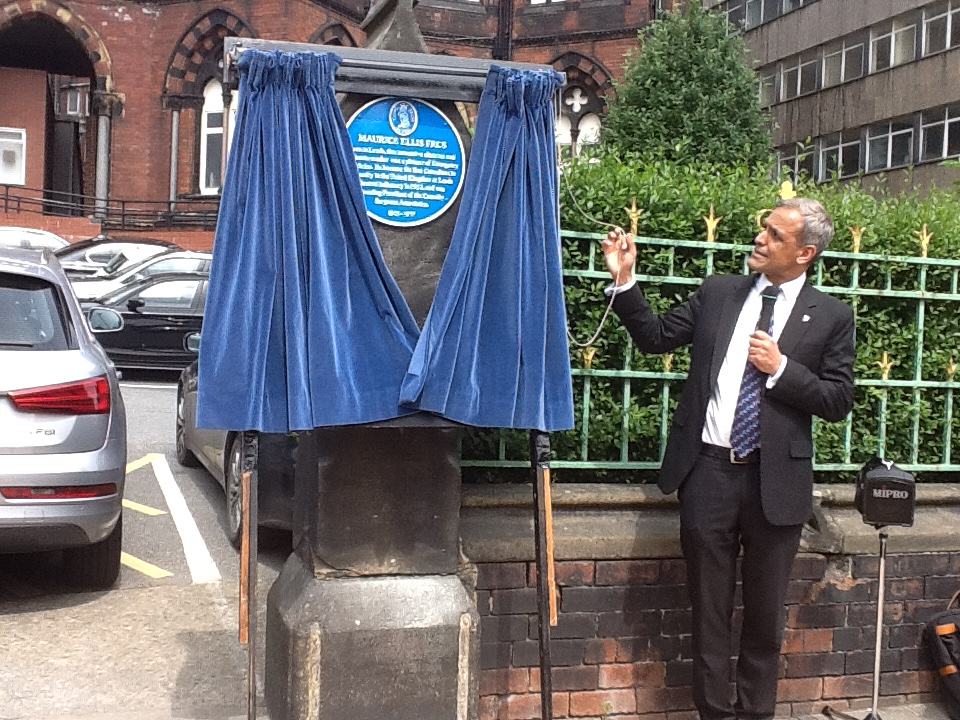
Maurice Ellis Blue Plaque Unveiling

It was not until Dr. John Wiegenstein founded the American College of Emergency Physicians (ACEP) the recognition of emergency medicine training programs by the AMA and the AOA, and in 1979 a historic vote by the American Board of Medical Specialties that emergency medicine became a recognized medical specialty in the US. The first emergency medicine residency program in the world began in 1970 at the University of Cincinnati. Furthermore, the first department of emergency medicine at a US medical school occurred in 1971 at the University of Southern California. The second residency program in the United States soon followed at what was then called Hennepin County General Hospital in Minneapolis, with two residents entering the program in 1971.

In 1990 the UK's Casualty Surgeons Association changed its name to the British Association for Accident and Emergency Medicine and subsequently became the British Association for Emergency Medicine (BAEM) in 2004. In 1993, an intercollegiate Faculty of Accident and Emergency Medicine (FAEM) became a "daughter college" of six royal medical colleges in England and Scotland to arrange professional examinations and training. In 2005, the BAEM and the FAEM became a single unit to form the College of Emergency Medicine, now the Royal College of Emergency Medicine, which conducts membership and fellowship examinations and publishes guidelines and standards for the practice of emergency medicine.

== Financing and practice organization ==
=== Reimbursement ===
Many hospitals and care centres feature departments of emergency medicine, where patients can receive acute care without an appointment. While many patients get treated for life-threatening injuries, others utilize the emergency department (ED) for non-urgent reasons such as headaches or a cold. (defined as "visits for conditions for which a delay of several hours would not increase the likelihood of an adverse outcome"). As such, EDs can adjust staffing ratios and designate an area of the department for faster patient turnover to accommodate various patient needs and volumes. Policies have improved to assist better ED staff (such as emergency medical technicians, paramedics). The emergency department, welfare programs, and healthcare clinics serve as a critical part of the healthcare safety net for uninsured patients who cannot afford medical treatment or adequately utilize their coverage.

In emergency departments in Australia, the government utilises an "Activity based funding and management", meaning that the amount of funding to emergency departments are allocated money based on the number of patients and the complexity of their cases or illnesses. However, rural emergency departments of Australia are funded under the principle of providing the necessary equipment and staffing levels required to provide safe and adequate care, not necessarily on the number of patients.

==== Compensation ====
In the United States, Emergency Physicians are compensated at a higher rate than some other specialities, ranking 10th out of 26 physician specialities in 2015, at an average salary of $306,000 annually. They are compensated in the mid-range (averaging $13,000 annually) for non-patient activities, such as speaking engagements or acting as an expert witness; they also saw a 12% increase in salary from 2014 – 2015 (which was not out of line with many other physician specialities that year). While emergency physicians work 8–12 hour shifts and do not tend to work on-call, the high level of stress and need for solid diagnostic and triage capabilities for the undifferentiated, acute patient contributes to arguments justifying higher salaries for these physicians. Emergency care must be available every hour of every day and requires a doctor to be available on-site 24/7, unlike an outpatient clinic or other hospital departments with more limited hours and may only call a physician in when needed. The necessity to have a physician on staff and all other diagnostic services available every hour of every day is thus a costly arrangement for hospitals.

==== Payment systems ====
American health payment systems are undergoing significant reform efforts, Which include compensating emergency physicians through "pay for performance" incentives and penalty measures under commercial and public health programs, including Medicare and Medicaid. This payment reform aims to improve the quality of care and control costs, despite the differing opinions on the existing evidence to show that this payment approach is effective in emergency medicine. Initially, these incentives would only target primary care providers (PCPs), but some would argue that emergency medicine is primary care, as no one refers patients to the ED. In one such program, two specific conditions listed were directly tied to patients frequently seen by emergency medical providers: acute myocardial infarction and pneumonia. (See: Hospital Quality Incentive Demonstration.)

There are some challenges with implementing these quality-based incentives in emergency medicine in that patients are often not given a definitive diagnosis in the ED, making it challenging to allocate payments through coding. Additionally, adjustments based on patient risk-level and multiple co-morbidities for complex patients further complicate attribution of positive or negative health outcomes. It is not easy to assess whether much of the costs directly result from the emergent condition treated in acutely care settings. It is also difficult to quantify the savings due to preventive care during emergency treatment (i.e. workup, stabilizing treatments, coordination of care and discharge, rather than a hospital admission). Thus, ED providers tend to support a modified fee-for-service model over other payment systems.

==== Overutilization ====
Some patients without health insurance utilize EDs as their primary form of medical care, as their financial status limits their access to consistent care. Because these patients cannot utilize insurance or primary care systems, emergency medical providers often increased volumes of lower acuity patients and risk of financial loss, especially since many patients cannot pay for their care (see below). ED overuse produces $38 billion in spending each year (i.e. care delivery and coordination failures, over-treatment, administrative complexity, pricing failures, and fraud), Moreover, it unnecessarily drains departmental resources, reducing the quality of care across all patients. While overuse is not limited to the uninsured, the uninsured constitute a growing proportion of non-urgent ED visits. Insurance coverage can help mitigate overutilization by improving access to alternative forms of care and lowering the need for emergency visits.

A common misconception identifies frequent ED visitors as a significant factor in excess spending. However, frequent ED users make up a small portion of those contributing to overutilization and are often insured.

=== Uncompensated care ===
Injury and illness are often unforeseen, and patients of lower socioeconomic status are especially susceptible to being suddenly burdened with the cost of a necessary ED visit. For example, in the event that a patient is unable to pay for medical care received, the hospital, under the Emergency Medical Treatment and Active Labor Act (EMTALA), is obligated to treat emergency conditions regardless of a patient's ability to pay and therefore faces an economic loss for this uncompensated care. Estimates suggest that over half (approximately 55%) of all quantifiable emergency care is uncompensated and inadequate reimbursement has led to the closure of many EDs. Policy changes (such as the Affordable Care Act) are expected to decrease the number of uninsured people and thereby reduce uncompensated care.

In addition to decreasing the uninsured rate, ED overutilization might reduce by improving patient access to primary care and increasing patient flow to alternative care centres for non-life-threatening injuries. Financial disincentives, patient education, and improved management for patients with chronic diseases can also reduce overutilization and help manage costs of care. Moreover, physician knowledge of prices for treatment and analyses, discussions on costs with their patients, and a changing culture away from defensive medicine can improve cost-effective use. A transition towards more value-based care in the ED is an avenue by which providers can contain costs.

=== Emergency Medicine Becoming Primary Provider of Healthcare. ===
The emergency department is commonly used only in emergencies. However, some individuals use the emergency department as their primary form of healthcare. The emergency room is characterized by high wait times, and it's mainly due to the misuse of the emergency department for non-emergencies. Individuals experiencing homelessness can't afford to see a primary care provider, and most homeless individuals don't have health insurance. Homeless individuals do not have access to preventative healthcare, which causes them to be at risk for health problems and have higher mortality rates. These contributions make homeless individuals use hospitals frequently, especially the emergency department. A survey conducted in 2017 by the National Hospital Ambulatory Medical Care found that there were an estimated 990,000 emergency department visits by homeless individuals.

Although patients who experience homelessness are the ones most frequently seen in the emergency department, they have the worst clinical outcomes among other patients. The care provided to these homeless individuals is influenced by how the physician was trained. Caring for the homeless population is complex, challenging, and resource-intensive. Emergency medicine education is lacking in formal curricula on the topic of homelessness, despite the benefits for resident morale and patient care. Informal teaching methods in residents and personal experiences with homeless patients have left physicians with misinterpretations and biased opinions about this population of patients. Residents often described feeling burned out when working with patients experiencing homelessness. This means that they are a need for improvement in training emergency providers on how to deal with this population in an empathetic and non-biased way. If physicians were trained to treat these individuals in a non-biased manner, clinical outcomes could be better in homeless patients.

==== EMTALA ====
Doctors that work in the EDs of hospitals receiving Medicare funding are subject to the provisions of EMTALA. The US Congress enacted EMTALA in 1986 to curtail "patient dumping", a practice whereby patients were refused medical care for economic or other non-medical reasons. Since its enactment, ED visits have substantially increased, with one study showing a rise in visits of 26% (which is more than double the increase in population over the same period). While more individuals are receiving care, a lack of funding and ED overcrowding may be affecting quality. To comply with the provisions of EMTALA, hospitals, through their ED physicians, must provide medical screening and stabilize the emergency medical conditions of anyone that presents themselves at a hospital ED with patient capacity. EMTALA holds both the hospital and the responsible ED physician liable for civil penalties of up to $50,000 if there is no help for those in need. While both the Office of Inspector General, U.S. Department of Health and Human Services (OIG) and private citizens can bring an action under EMTALA, courts have uniformly held that ED physicians can only be held liable if the case is prosecuted by OIG (whereas hospitals are subject to penalties regardless of who brings the suit). Additionally, the Centres for Medicare and Medicaid Services (CMS) can discontinue provider status under Medicare for physicians that do not comply with EMTALA. Liability also extends to on-call physicians that fail to respond to an ED request to come to the hospital to provide service. While the goals of EMTALA are laudable, commentators have noted that it appears to have created a substantial unfunded burden on the resources of hospitals and emergency physicians. As a result of financial difficulty, between the period of 1991–2011, 12.6% of EDs in the US closed.

=== Care delivery in different ED settings ===
==== Rural ====
Despite the practice emerging over the past few decades, the delivery of emergency medicine has significantly increased and evolved across diverse settings related to cost, provider availability and overall usage. Before the Affordable Care Act (ACA), low-acuity emergency medicine visits were leveraged primarily by "uninsured or underinsured patients, women, children, and minorities, all of whom frequently face barriers to accessing primary care". While this still exists today, as mentioned above, it is critical to consider the location in which care is delivered to understand the population and system challenges related to overutilization and high cost. In rural communities where provider and ambulatory facility shortages exist, a primary care physician (PCP) in the ED with general knowledge is likely to be the only source of health care for a population, as specialists and other health resources are generally unavailable due to lack of funding and desire to serve in these areas. As a result, the incidence of complex co-morbidities not managed by the appropriate provider results in worse health outcomes and eventually costlier care that extends beyond rural communities. Though typically quite separated, PCPs in rural areas must partner with larger health systems to comprehensively address the complex needs of their community, improve population health, and implement strategies such as telemedicine to improve health outcomes and reduce ED utilization for preventable illnesses. (See: Rural health.)

Rural care has benefitted in the post-pandemic (2020) era by the rapid expansion of telemedicine programs, including those that assist with Emergency Medical care. This has enhanced the ability of non-Emergency Medicine boarded physicians, physician assistants and nurse practitioners to provide a higher level of care by partnering with Emergency Physicians at larger centers, via telehealth.

==== Urban ====
Alternatively, emergency medicine in urban areas consists of diverse provider groups, including physicians, physician assistants, nurse practitioners and registered nurses who coordinate with specialists in both inpatient and outpatient facilities to address patients' needs, more specifically in the ED. For all systems, regardless of funding source, EMTALA mandates EDs to conduct a medical examination for anyone that presents at the department, irrespective of paying ability. Non-profit hospitals and health systems – as required by the ACA – must provide a certain threshold of charity care "by actively ensuring that those who qualify for financial assistance get it, by charging reasonable rates to uninsured patients and by avoiding extraordinary collection practices." While there are limitations, this mandate provides support to many in need. That said, despite policy efforts and increased funding and federal reimbursement in urban areas, the triple aim (of improving patient experience, enhancing population health, and reducing the per-capita cost of care) remains a challenge without providers' and payers' collaboration to increase access to preventive care and decrease in ED usage. As a result, many experts support the notion that emergency medical services should only serve immediate risks in urban and rural areas.

==== Patient–provider relationships ====
As stated above, EMTALA includes provisions that protect patients from being turned away or transferred before adequate stabilisation. Upon making contact with a patient, EMS providers are responsible for diagnosing and stabilising a patient's condition without regard for the ability to pay. In the pre-hospital setting, providers must exercise appropriate judgement in choosing a suitable hospital for transport. Hospitals can only turn away incoming ambulances if they are on diversion and incapable of providing adequate care. However, once a patient has arrived on hospital property, care must be provided. At the hospital, a triage nurse first contacts the patient, who determines the appropriate level of care needed.

According to Mead v. Legacy Health System, a patient-physician relationship is established when "the physician takes an affirmative action with regard to the care of the patient". Initiating such a relationship forms a legal contract in which the physician must continue to provide treatment or adequately terminate the relationship. This legal responsibility can extend to physician consultations and on-call physicians even without direct patient contact. In emergency medicine, termination of the patient–provider relationship prior to stabilization or without handoff to another qualified provider is considered abandonment. In order to initiate an outside transfer, a physician must verify that the next hospital can provide a similar or higher level of care. Hospitals and physicians must also ensure that the patient's condition will not be further aggravated by the transfer process.

The setting of emergency medicine presents a challenge for delivering high quality, patient-centered care. Clear, effective communication can be particularly difficult due to noise, frequent interruptions, and high patient turnover. The Society for Academic Emergency Medicine has identified five essential tasks for patient-physician communication: establishing rapport, gathering information, giving information, providing comfort, and collaboration. The miscommunication of patient information is a crucial source of medical error; minimising shortcoming in communication remains a topic of current and future research.

==== Medical error ====
Many circumstances, including the regular transfer of patients in emergency treatment and crowded, noisy and chaotic ED environments, make emergency medicine particularly susceptible to medical error and near misses. One study identified an error rate of 18 per 100 registered patients in one particular academic ED. Another study found that where a lack of teamwork (i.e. poor communication, lack of team structure, lack of cross-monitoring) was implicated in a particular incident of ED medical error, "an average of 8.8 teamwork failures occurred per case [and] more than half of the deaths and permanent disabilities that occurred were judged avoidable." Particular cultural (i.e. "a focus on the errors of others and a 'blame-and-shame' culture") and structural (i.e. lack of standardisation and equipment incompatibilities) aspects of emergency medicine often result in a lack of disclosure of medical error and near misses to patients and other caregivers. While concerns about malpractice liability are one reason why disclosure of medical errors is not made, some have noted that disclosing the error and providing an apology can mitigate malpractice risk. Ethicists uniformly agree that the disclosure of a medical error that causes harm is a care provider's duty. The critical components of the disclosure include "honesty, explanation, empathy, apology, and the chance to lessen the chance of future errors" (represented by the mnemonic HEEAL). The nature of emergency medicine is such that error will likely always be a substantial risk of emergency care. However, maintaining public trust through open communication regarding a harmful error can help patients and physicians constructively address problems when they occur.

== Treatments ==
Emergency medicine is a primary or first-contact point of care for patients requiring the use of the health care system. Specialists in emergency medicine are required to possess specialist skills in acute illness diagnosis and resuscitation. Emergency physicians are responsible for providing immediate recognition, evaluation, care, and stabilisation to adult and pediatric patients in response to acute illness and injury.

Emergency medical physicians provide treatments to a range of cases requiring vast knowledge. They deal with patients from mental illnesses to physical and anything in-between. An average treatment process would likely involve investigation, then diagnosis, then either treatment or the patient being admitted. In terms of procedures, they cover a wide and broad range, including treatment to GSW's (Gun Shot Wounds), Head and body traumas, stomach bugs, mental episodes, seizures and much more. They are some of the most highly trained physicians in the world and are responsible for providing immediate recognition, evaluation, care, and stabilisation to adult and paediatric patients in response to acute illness and injury.

== Training ==
There are a variety of international models for emergency medicine training. There are two different models among those with well-developed training programs: a "specialist" model or "a multidisciplinary model". Additionally, in some countries, the emergency medicine specialist rides in the ambulance. For example, in France and Germany, the physician, often an anesthesiologist, rides in the ambulance and provides stabilising care at the scene. The patient is directed to the appropriate hospital department, so emergency care is much more multidisciplinary than the Anglo-American model.

In countries such as the US, the United Kingdom, Canada and Australia, ambulances crewed by paramedics and emergency medical technicians respond to out-of-hospital emergencies and transport patients to emergency departments, meaning there is more dependence on these healthcare providers and there is more dependence on paramedics and EMTs for on-scene care. Emergency physicians are therefore more "specialists" since all patients are taken to the emergency department. Most developing countries follow the Anglo-American model: the gold standard is three or four-year independent residency training programs in emergency medicine. Some countries develop training programs based on a primary care foundation with additional emergency medicine training. In developing countries, there is an awareness that Western models may not be applicable and may not be the best use of limited health care resources. For example, specialty training and pre-hospital care in developed countries are too expensive and impractical for use in many developing countries with limited health care resources. International emergency medicine provides a critical global perspective and hope for improvement in these areas.

A brief review of some of these programs follows:

=== Argentina ===
In Argentina, the SAE (Sociedad Argentina de Emergencias) is the leading organisation of emergency medicine. There are many residency programs. Also, it is possible to reach the certification with a two-year postgraduate university course after a few years of ED background.

=== Australia and New Zealand ===
The specialist medical college responsible for emergency medicine in Australia and New Zealand is the Australasian College for Emergency Medicine (ACEM). The training program is nominally seven years in duration, after which the trainee is awarded a Fellowship of ACEM, conditional upon passing all necessary assessments.

Dual fellowship programs also exist for paediatric medicine (in conjunction with the Royal Australasian College of Physicians) and intensive care medicine (in conjunction with the College of Intensive Care Medicine). These programs nominally add one or more years to the ACEM training program.

For medical doctors not (and not wishing to be) specialists in emergency medicine but have a significant interest or workload in emergency departments, the ACEM provides non-specialist certificates and diplomas.

The Australian College of Rural and Remote Medicine (ACRRM) is the responsible body for the training and upholding of standards for practice and provision of rural and remote medical care. Prospective rural generalists undertaking this four-year fellowship program have an opportunity to complete Advanced Specialised Training (AST) in emergency medicine.

New Zealand chose to recognise urgent care as a separate vocational scope of practice, independent from hospitals. The Royal New Zealand College of Urgent Care (RNZCUC) was established to provide training and certification for doctors specialising in Urgent Care outside major hospital emergency departments.

=== Belgium ===
In Belgium there are three recognised ways to practice emergency medicine. Until 2005 there was no accredited emergency medicine program; emergency medicine was performed by general practitioners (having followed a 240-hour course, Acute Medicine) or by specialists (surgeon, internal medicine, neurologist, anesthesiologist) with or without supra-specialty training in emergency medicine.

Since 2005, residency training has existed for acute medicine (3 years) or emergency medicine (6 years), governed by the Belgian ministerial decree of 14 February 2005 setting the special accreditation criteria for specialists in emergency medicine and acute medicine. At least 50% of the training takes place in the emergency department, with the remainder rotating through disciplines such as pediatrics, surgery, orthopedic surgery, anesthesiology and critical care medicine.

Alternatively, an attending physician in one of the following specialties — anesthesiology, internal medicine, cardiology, gastroenterology, pneumology, rheumatology, urology, general surgery, plastic and reconstructive surgery, orthopedic surgery, neurology, neurosurgery, or pediatrics — can complete a two-year supra-specialty program to become an emergency medicine specialist.

=== Brazil ===
In Brazil, the first emergency medicine residency program was created at Hospital Pronto Socorro de Porto Alegre in 1996. In 2002, the emergency medical services were standardized nationally with the creation of SAMU (Serviço de atendimento móvel de urgência), inspired by French EMS, which also provides training to its employees. The nacional emergency medicina association (ABRAMEDE – Associação Brasileira de Medicina de Emergência) was created in 2007. In 2008 the second residency program was started at Messejana Hospital in Fortaleza. Then, in 2015, emergency medicine was formally recognized as a medical specialty by the Brazilian Medical Association. After formal recognition, multiple residency programs were created nationwide (e.g. Universidade Federal de Minas Gerais in 2016 and Universidade de São Paulo in 2017). The residency consists of a three-year program with training in all emergency department specialties (i.e. internal medicine, surgery, pediatrics, orthopedics, OB/GYN), EMS and intensive care.

=== Chile ===
In Chile, emergency medicine begins its journey in Chile with the first specialty program at the beginning of the 1990s, at the University of Chile and the University of Santiago of Chile. Currently, it is a primary specialty legally recognised by the Ministry of Health since 2013. It has multiple training programs for specialists, notably the University of Chile, Pontifical Catholic University of Chile, Clínica Alemana – Universidad del Desarrollo, San Sebastian University – MUE and University of Santiago of Chile (USACH). Currently, and intending to strengthen the specialty at the country level, FOAMed initiatives have emerged (free open access medical education in emergency medicine) and the #ChileEM initiative that brings together the programs of the Universidad San Sebastián / MUE, Universidad Católica de Chile and Universidad de Chile, intend to hold joint clinical meetings between the leading training programs, regularly and open to all the health team working in the field of urgency. The specialists already trained are grouped in the Chilean Society of Emergency Medicine (SOCHIMU).

=== Canada ===
The two routes to emergency medicine certification can be summarized as follows:

1. A five-year residency leads to the designation of FRCP(EM) through the Royal College of Physicians and Surgeons of Canada (Emergency Medicine Board Certification – emergency medicine consultant).
2. A one-year emergency medicine enhanced skills program following a two-year family medicine residency leading to the designation of CCFP(EM) through the College of Family Physicians of Canada (Advanced Competency Certification). The CFPC also allows those are having worked a minimum of four years at a minimum of 400 hours per year in emergency medicine to challenge the examination of special competence in emergency medicine and thus become specialized.

CCFP(EM) emergency physicians outnumber FRCP(EM) physicians by a ratio of about 3 to 1, and they tend to work primarily as clinicians with a minor focus on academic activities such as teaching and research. FRCP(EM) Emergency Medicine Board specialists tend to congregate in academic centres and have more academically oriented careers, which emphasize administration, research, critical care, disaster medicine, and teaching. They also tend to sub-specialize in toxicology, critical care, pediatric emergency medicine, and sports medicine. Furthermore, the FRCP(EM) residency length allows more time for formal training in these areas.

Physician assistants are currently practising in the field of emergency medicine in Canada.

=== China ===
The current post-graduate emergency medicine training process is highly complex in China. The first EM post-graduate training took place in 1984 at the Peking Union Medical College Hospital. Because specialty certification in EM has not been established, formal training is not required to practice emergency medicine in China.

About a decade ago, emergency medicine residency training was centralized at the municipal levels, following the Ministry of Public Health guidelines. Residency programs in all hospitals are called residency training bases, which have to be approved by local health governments. These bases are hospital-based, but the residents are selected and managed by the municipal associations of medical education. These associations are also the authoritative body of setting up their residents' training curriculum. All medical school graduates who want to practice medicine have to undergo five years of residency training at designated training bases, the first three years of general rotation followed by two more years of specialty-centred training.

=== Germany ===
In Germany, emergency medicine is not handled as a specialization (Facharztrichtung), but any licensed physician can acquire an additional qualification in emergency medicine through an 80-hour course monitored by the respective "Ärztekammer" (medical association, responsible for licensing of physicians). This qualifies the emergency physician to work in the pre-hospital field. These physicians usually work on a volunteering basis and are often anesthesiologists but may be specialists of any kind. If a hospital has an emergency department, which is not generally required, it is usually staffed by residents without specialty training in emergency medicine.

=== India ===
India is an example of how family medicine can be a foundation for emergency medicine training. Many private hospitals and institutes have been providing emergency medicine training for doctors, nurses and paramedics since 1994, with certification programs varying from six months to three years. However, emergency medicine was only recognized as a separate specialty by the Medical Council of India in July 2009.

=== Malaysia ===
There are three universities (Universiti Sains Malaysia, Universiti Kebangsaan Malaysia, and Universiti Malaya) that offer master's degrees in emergency medicine – postgraduate training programs of four years in duration with clinical rotations, examinations and a dissertation. The first cohort of locally trained emergency physicians graduated in 2002.

=== Saudi Arabia ===
In Saudi Arabia, the Certification of Emergency Medicine takes the four-year Saudi Board of Emergency Medicine (SBEM), which the Saudi Council accredits for Health Specialties (SCFHS). It requires passing the two-part exam: first and final part (written and oral) to obtain the SBEM certificate, equivalent to a doctorate.

=== United States ===
Most programs are three years in duration, but some programs are four years long. There are several combined residencies offered with other programs, including family medicine, internal medicine and paediatrics. The US is well known for its excellence in emergency medicine residency programs, leading to some controversy about specialty certification.

There are three ways to become board-certified in emergency medicine:

- The American Board of Emergency Medicine (ABEM) is for those with either Doctor of Medicine (MD) or Doctor of Osteopathic Medicine (DO) degrees. The ABEM is under the authority of the American Board of Medical Specialties.
- The American Osteopathic Board of Emergency Medicine (AOBEM) certifies only emergency physicians with a DO degree. It is under the authority of the American Osteopathic Association Bureau of Osteopathic Specialists.
- The Board of Certification in Emergency Medicine (BCEM) grants board certification in emergency medicine to physicians who have not completed an emergency medicine residency but have completed a residency in other fields (internists, family practitioners, paediatricians, general surgeons, and anesthesiologists). The BCEM is under the authority of the American Board of Physician Specialties.

Several ABMS fellowships are available for emergency medicine graduates, including pre-hospital medicine (emergency medical services), international medicine, advanced resuscitation, hospice and palliative care, research, undersea and hyperbaric medicine, sports medicine, pain medicine, ultrasound, pediatric emergency medicine, disaster medicine, wilderness medicine, toxicology, and critical care medicine.

In recent years, workforce data has led to a recognition of the need for additional training for primary care physicians who provide emergency care. It has led to several supplemental training programs in first-hour emergency care and a few fellowships for family physicians in emergency medicine.

==== Funding for training ====
"In 2010, there were 157 allopathic and 37 osteopathic emergency medicine residency programs, which collectively accept about 2,000 new residents each year. Studies have shown that attending emergency physician supervision of residents correlates to higher quality and more cost-effective practice, primarily when an emergency medicine residency exists." Medical education is primarily funded through the Medicare program; payments are given to hospitals for each resident. "Fifty-five per cent of ED payments come from Medicare, fifteen per cent from Medicaid, five per cent from private payment and twenty-five per cent from commercially insured patients." However, choices of physician specialties are not mandated by any agency or program, so even though emergency departments see many Medicare/Medicaid patients and thus receive much funding for training from these programs, there is still concern over a shortage of specialty-trained emergency medicine providers.

=== United Kingdom ===
In the United Kingdom, the Royal College of Emergency Medicine has a role in setting professional standards and assessing trainees. Emergency medical trainees enter specialty training after five or six years of Medical school followed by two years of foundation training. Specialty training takes six years to complete, and success in the assessments and a set of five examinations results in the award of Fellowship of the Royal College of Emergency Medicine (FRCEM).

Historically, emergency specialists were drawn from anaesthesia, medicine, and surgery. Many established EM consultants were surgically trained; some hold the fellowship of Royal College of Surgeons of Edinburgh in accident and emergency – FRCSEd (A&E). trainees in emergency medicine may dual accredit in intensive care medicine or seek sub-specialisation in paediatric emergency medicine.

=== Turkey ===
Emergency medicine residencies last four years in Turkey. These physicians have a two-year obligatory service in Turkey to be qualified to have their diploma. After this period, EM specialists can choose to work in private or governmental emergency departments.

=== Pakistan ===
The College of Physicians and Surgeons Pakistan accredited the training in emergency medicine in 2010. Emergency medicine training in Pakistan lasts for five years. The initial two years involve trainees being sent to three major areas: medicine and allied, surgery, and allied and critical care. It is divided into six months each, and the rest six months out of the first two years are spent in the emergency department. In the last three years, trainee residents spend most of their time in the emergency room as senior residents. Certificate courses include ACLS, PALS, ATLS, and research and dissertations are required to complete the training successfully. At the end of five years, candidates become eligible to sit for the FCPS part II exam. After fulfilling the requirement, they become fellows of the College of Physicians and Surgeons Pakistan in emergency medicine ().

Institutions providing this training include Shifa International Hospitals Islamabad, Aga Khan University Hospital Karachi, POF Hospital Wah, Lady Reading Hospital Peshawar, Indus Hospital Karachi and Jinnah Post Graduate Medical Center Karachi, and Mayo Hospital, Lahore.

=== Iran ===
The first residency program in Iran started in 2002 at Iran University of Medical Sciences, and there are now three-year standard residency programs running in Tehran, Tabriz, Mashhad, Isfahan, and some other universities. All these programs work under the supervision of the emergency medicine specialty board committee. There are now more than 200 (and increasing) board-certified Emergency Physicians in Iran.

== Ethical and medicolegal issues ==
Ethical and medico-legal issues are embedded within the nature of emergency medicine. Issues surrounding competence, end of life care, and the right to refuse care are encountered daily within the emergency department. Of growing significance are the ethical issues and legal obligations that surround the Mental Health Act, as increasing numbers of suicide attempts and self-harm are seen in the emergency department. The Wooltorton case of 2007, in which a patient arrived at the emergency department post overdose with a note specifying her request for no interventions, highlights the dichotomy that often exists between a physician's ethical obligation to "do no harm" and the legality of a patient's right to refuse.

== See also ==
- Emergency medical services
- Emergency medical technician
- First aid
- Golden hour
- International emergency medicine
- Medical emergency
- Paramedic
- Pediatric emergency medicine
- Physician assistant
- Physician
- Pre-hospital emergency medicine
- Prehospital and Disaster Medicine
- Rescue squad
- Royal College of Emergency Medicine
- Traumatology
