= Outline of emergency medicine =

Medical specialty that treats patients who require immediate medical attention

The following outline is provided as an overview of and topical guide to emergency medicine:

Emergency medicine – medical specialty involving care for undifferentiated, unscheduled patients with acute illnesses or injuries that require immediate medical attention. While not usually providing long-term or continuing care, emergency physicians undertake acute investigations and interventions to resuscitate and stabilize patients. Emergency physicians generally practice in hospital emergency departments, pre-hospital settings via emergency medical services, and intensive care units.

== Presentations ==
- Abdominal pain
- Altered level of consciousness
- Back pain
- Chest pain
- Coma
- Confusion
- Constipation
- Cyanosis
- Diarrhea
- Dizziness
- Dyspnea
- Fever
- Gastrointestinal bleeding
- Headache
- Hemoptysis
- Jaundice
- Nausea and vomiting
- Pelvic pain
- Seizure
- Sore throat
- Syncope
- Testicular pain
- Vaginal bleeding
- Vertigo
- Weakness

== Types of emergencies ==
Listed below are conditions that constitute a possible medical emergency and may require immediate first aid, emergency room care, surgery, or care by a physician or nurse. Not all medical emergencies are life-threatening; some conditions require medical attention in order to prevent significant and long-lasting effects on physical or mental health.

=== Blood ===
- Anemia
- Polycythemia
- Acute promyelocytic leukemia
- Disseminated intravascular coagulation

=== Children ===
- Croup
- Limp

=== Endocrine ===
- Acid base disorder
- Diabetes mellitus
- Rhabdomyolysis
- Thyroid storm
- Adrenal crisis
- Addisonian crisis
- Dehydration
- Diabetic coma
  - Diabetic ketoacidosis
  - Hyperosmolar hyperglycemic state
  - Hypoglycemic coma
- Electrolyte disturbance
- Hepatic encephalopathy
- Hypercalcemic crisis
- Lactic acidosis
- Malnutrition and starvation
- Pheochromocytoma

=== Environmental ===
- Accidental hypothermia
- Drowning
- Electric shock and lightning injuries
- Frostbite
- Heat illness
- Radiation injuries
- Scuba diving hazards and dysbarism

=== Eyes ===
- Acute angle-closure glaucoma
- Giant-cell arteritis
- Orbital perforation or penetration
- Retinal detachment

=== Gastrointestinal ===
- Appendicitis
- Biliary colic
- Cholecystitis
- Gastroenteritis
- Small bowel obstruction
- Crohn's disease
- Peritonitis

=== Genitourinary ===
- Acute prostatitis
- Paraphimosis
- Priapism
- Testicular torsion
- Ovarian torsion
- Urinary retention
- Kidney failure
- Sexually transmitted infection

=== Heart and blood vessels ===
- Acute coronary syndrome
- Air embolism (arterial)
- Aortic aneurysm (ruptured)
  - Abdominal aortic aneurysm
- Aortic dissection
- Bleeding
  - Internal bleeding
- Hypovolemia
- Cardiac arrest
- Cardiac arrhythmia
  - Ventricular fibrillation
  - Supraventricular tachycardia
- Cardiac tamponade
- Deep vein thrombosis
- Heart block
- Heart failure
- Hypertensive emergency
- Infectious endocarditis
- Myocardial infarction (heart attack)
- Myocarditis
- Pericarditis
- Peripheral vascular disease
- Pulmonary embolism
- Valvular heart disease

=== Infectious disease ===
- HIV/AIDS
- Cellulitis
- Necrotizing fasciitis
- Osteomyelitis
- Rabies
- Sepsis
- Overwhelming post-splenectomy infection
- Septic arthritis
- Tuberculosis
- Meningitis
- Cholera
- Ear infection
- Gas gangrene
- Lyme disease
- Malaria
- Neutropenic sepsis
- Salmonella poisoning

=== Inflammatory ===
- Allergy
- Anaphylaxis
- Arthritis
- Bursitis
- Systemic lupus erythematosus
- Vasculitis

=== Injury ===
- Abdominal trauma
- Nose bleed
- Appendicitis
- Ballistic trauma (gunshot wound)
- Bite
- Blunt trauma
- Bone fracture
- Burns
- Chest trauma
- Child abuse
- Domestic abuse
- Facial trauma
- Flail chest
- Foreign body
- Fulminant colitis
- Head injury
- Hyperthermia (including heat stroke or sunstroke)
  - Malignant hyperthermia
- Hypothermia or frostbite
- Intestinal obstruction
- Pancreatitis
- Peritonitis
- Polytrauma
- Ruptured spleen
- Sexual assault
- Spinal disc herniation
- Spinal injury
- Sensorineural hearing loss
- Traumatic brain injury
- Wound

=== Lungs and airway ===
- Agonal breathing
- Asphyxia
  - Angioedema
  - Choking
  - Drowning
  - Smoke inhalation
- Asthma
- Chronic obstructive pulmonary disease
- Epiglottitis
- Pleurisy
- Pneumonia
- Pneumothorax
- Pulmonary embolism
- Respiratory failure
- Upper respiratory infection

=== Nephrology ===
- Acute kidney injury

=== Nervous system ===
- Spinal-cord injury
- Cerebrovascular accident (stroke)
- Delirium
- Neuroleptic malignant syndrome
- Seizures
  - Status epilepticus
  - Epilepsy
- Serotonin syndrome
- Status migrainosus
- Subarachnoid hemorrhage
- Subdural hematoma

=== Pregnancy ===
- Ectopic pregnancy
- Eclampsia
- Pre-eclampsia
  - HELLP syndrome
- Fetal distress
- Obstetrical bleeding
- Placental abruption
- Prolapsed cord
- Puerperal sepsis
- Shoulder dystocia
- Uterine rupture

=== Psychiatric ===
- Anxiety
- Attempted suicide
- Excited delirium
- Homicidal ideation
- Mood disorder
- Psychomotor agitation
- Psychotic episode
- Somatoform disorder
- Suicidal ideation
- Thought disorder

=== Skin ===
- Acute urticaria
- Angioedema
- Erythema multiforme major
- Kasabach–Merritt syndrome
- Toxic epidermal necrolysis

=== Toxicological ===
- Overdose
  - Acetaminophen overdose
  - Aspirin overdose and other NSAIDs
- Poisoning
- Beta blocker toxicity
- Calcium channel blocker toxicity
- Ethylene glycol poisoning
- Food poisoning

=== Gynecologic ===
- Gynecologic hemorrhage
- Ovarian torsion
- Sexual assault (rape)

== Emergency medical care ==
- First aid
- Golden hour
- Triage

=== Critical care ===
- Acute Care of at-Risk Newborns (ACoRN)
- Airway management
- Care of the Critically Ill Surgical Patient (CCrISP)
- Mechanical ventilation
- Shock
- Resuscitation
  - Cardiopulmonary resuscitation (CPR)
  - Neonatal Resuscitation Program (NRP)
  - Advanced Cardiac Life Support (ACLS)
  - Pediatric Advanced Life Support (PALS)
  - Advanced Trauma Life Support(ATLS)

==== Life support ====
- Basic life support (BLS)
- Advanced life support
  - Advanced cardiac life support (ACLS)
  - Advanced trauma life support (ATLS)
    - ABC (medicine)
    - Pneumothorax
    - Pericardial tamponade
  - Pediatric Advanced Life Support (PALS)

=== Environmental medicine ===
Environmental medicine

- High altitude medicine
- Travel medicine
- Mass-gathering medicine

== Branches of emergency medicine ==
- Emergency medical services
- Emergency nursing
- Emergency psychiatry
- International emergency medicine
- Pediatric emergency medicine
- Pre-hospital emergency medicine
- Social emergency medicine

=== Contributory fields ===
Emergency medicine is multidisciplinary – due to the diversity of medical emergencies encountered, emergency medicine relies heavily upon the knowledge and procedures of many medical specialties, including:

- Critical care medicine
- Disaster medicine
- Hospice care
- Hyperbaric medicine
- Pain management
- Palliative care
- Sports medicine
- Ultrasound
- Wilderness medicine

== Emergency medical system ==
- Emergency telephone number

=== Emergency medical services ===
Emergency medical services

- Ambulance
- Emergency medical dispatch
  - Medical Priority Dispatch System (US)
  - Computer-aided call handling (US)
  - Advanced Medical Priority Dispatch System (UK)
- Emergency medical technician
- Paramedic

=== Emergency medical facilities ===
- Emergency department
- Poison control center
- Trauma center

=== Emergency medical professionals ===
- Emergency physician
- Emergency nurse
- Emergency medical technician
- Paramedic

== Tools and equipment ==
Emergency medical equipment

- Bag valve mask (BVM)
- Chest tube
- Defibrillation (AED, ICD)
- Electrocardiogram (ECG/EKG)
- Intraosseous infusion (IO)
- Intravenous therapy (IV)
- Tracheal intubation
- Laryngeal tube
- Combitube
- Nasopharyngeal airway (NPA)
- Oropharyngeal airway (OPA)
- Pocket mask

=== Drugs ===
- Atropine
- Amiodarone
- Dopamine
- Epinephrine / Adrenaline
- Magnesium sulfate
- Hydralazine

== History ==
- History of the ambulance
- History of emergency medical services

== Journals ==
- Critical Care Medicine
- Intensive Care Medicine
- Military Medicine
- Shock
- Trauma
- Academic Emergency Medicine
- American Journal of Emergency Medicine
- Annals of Emergency Medicine
- Annals of Intensive Care
- Critical Care Clinics
- Emergency Medicine Australasia
- Emergency Medicine Journal
- Indian Journal of Critical Care Medicine
- Injury Prevention
- Journal of Critical Care
- Journal of Emergencies, Trauma, and Shock
- Journal of Emergency Nursing
- Journal of Injury and Violence Research
- Journal of Intensive Care Medicine
- Pediatric Critical Care Medicine
- Prehospital Emergency Care
- The Journal of Emergency Medicine

== Organizations ==
- American Board of Emergency Medicine
- American College of Emergency Physicians
- American Osteopathic Board of Emergency Medicine
- Asian Society for Emergency Medicine
- Australasian College for Emergency Medicine
- British Association for Immediate Care
- Canadian Association of Emergency Physicians
- Emergency Nurses Association
- European Resuscitation Council
- European Society of Emergency Medicine
- International Federation for Emergency Medicine
- International Liaison Committee on Resuscitation
- Resuscitation Council
- Royal College of Emergency Medicine

== See also ==
- Outline of medicine
