= Jean-Louis Vincent =

Physician

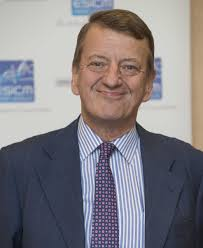
Prof. Jean-Louis Vincent

Baron Jean-Louis Vincent is a Belgian physician and Professor of intensive care medicine at the Université libre de Bruxelles.

== Biography ==
Jean-Louis Vincent studied at the Université libre de Bruxelles where he obtained an MD degree in 1973. He trained in Internal Medicine and Critical Care at the Hôpital d'Ixelles and the Hôpital Universitaire St-Pierre in Brussels. Vincent then spent two years training at the University of Southern California with Prof. Max Harry Weil. He earned a PhD degree in 1982 at the Université libre de Bruxelles studying electro-mechanical dissociation during cardiac arrest. Vincent joined the Department of Intensive Care of Erasmus Hospital in Brussels (Université libre de Bruxelles) in 1979, serving as Head of Department from 1996 to 2014, and is currently as a consultant intensivist.

Vincent has published more than 1,300 original scientific manuscripts, 1,000 review articles and editorials, and 400 book chapters, and has edited 123 books. His name appears more than 1,300 times in PubMed, and his work has been cited more than 230,000 times with an H-index of 170. He is the editor-in-chief of Critical Care, Current Opinion in Critical Care, and ICU Management and Practice". Vincent is past-President of the World Federation of Societies of Intensive and Critical Care Medicine, the European Society of Intensive Care Medicine, the European Shock Society, the Belgian Society of Intensive Care Medicine and the International Sepsis Forum. He was a Council member of the Society of Critical Care Medicine from 2011 to 2013. He is a member of the Belgian Royal Academy of Medicine.

Since 1980, he has organised an International Symposium on Intensive Care and Emergency Medicine (ISICEM), which is held every March in Brussels.

Vincent has received several awards for his work with the critically ill: the Distinguished Investigator Award of the Society of Critical Care Medicine, the College Medalist Award of the American College of Chest Physicians, the "Society Medal” (lifetime award) of the European Society of Intensive Care Medicine, and the prestigious Belgian scientific award of the FRS-FNRS (Prix Scientifique Joseph Maisin-Sciences biomédicales cliniques).

== Editorial boards (non-exhaustive list) ==
- Critical Care Medicine (since 1990) – (Senior editor since 1997)
- American Journal of Respiratory and Critical Care Medicine
- Intensive Care Medicine
- Journal of Critical Care (since 1990)
- Annals of Intensive Care
- Seminars in Respiratory and Critical Care Medicine (since 2008)
- Shock (since 1994)
- Journal of Intensive Care (since 2013)
- The Lancet Infectious Diseases (since 2000)
- PLoS Medicine (since 2005)
- EBioMedicine (since 2014)
- BMC Medicine (since 2006)
- BMC Infection Control (Senior Editor since 2011)
- Journal of Postgraduate Medicine (since 2004)
- Postgraduate Medical Journal (since 2007)
- Journal of Thoracic Disease (since 2016)
- Antimicrobial Resistance and Infection Control (Senior Editor since 2011)
- Indian Journal of Anaesthesia (since 2016)
- Indian Journal of Critical Care Medicine (since 1997)
- Spanish journal of Intensive Care Medicine (since 2016)
- The Netherlands Journal of Medicine (since 2009)

== Editor (non-exhaustive list) ==
- Update in Intensive Care and Emergency Medicine
- Yearbook of Intensive Care and Emergency Medicine
- Annual Update in Intensive Care and Emergency Medicine
- Sepsis Grave et Choc Septique...
- Insuffisance Circulatoire Aiguë
- Controversies in Acute Kidney Injury
- Textbook of Critical Care
- Encyclopedia of Intensive Care Medicine
- Terapia Intensiva

== Selected bibliography ==
1. Dellinger, R P (2013). "Surviving Sepsis Campaign: International Guidelines for Management of Severe Sepsis and Septic Shock, 2012". Intensive Care Medicine. 39 (2): 165–228. doi:10.1007/s00134-012-2769-8. PMC 7095153. PMID 23361625.
2. Singer, M (2016). "The third international consensus definitions for sepsis and septic shock (Sepsis-3)". JAMA. 315 (8): 801–810. doi:10.1001/jama.2016.0287. PMC 4968574. PMID 26903338.
3. Vincent, J-L (1996). "The SOFA (Sepsis-related Organ Failure Assessment) score to describe organ dysfunction/failure". Intensive Care Medicine. 92 (7): 707–710. doi:10.1007/BF01709751. PMID 8844239. S2CID 40396839.
