= Care of the Critically Ill Surgical Patient =

Training programme for surgical doctors

Care of the Critically Ill Surgical Patient (CCrISP) is a training programme for surgical doctors. The course covers the theoretical basis and practical skills required to manage critically ill surgical patients. It is managed by the Royal College of Surgeons of England. The 4th edition, which reduced the duration to 2 days, was released in February 2017.

== Background ==
CCrISP was designed by Mr. Iain Anderson, Senior Lecturer in Surgery, Manchester University, for the Royal College of Surgeons of England, as a result of the Hillsborough disaster. The first course was run in 1998 by the Hillsborough Trust. The 2nd edition was published in 2003, the 3rd in 2010 and the current (4th edition) in 2017.

== Training bodies ==
In addition to the RCS England, CCrISP courses are run by the following surgical training bodies:

- Academy of Medicine of Malaysia
- Royal Australasian College of Surgeons
- Royal College of Surgeons in Ireland (RCSI)
- Royal College of Surgeons of Edinburgh

== Eligibility ==
=== United Kingdom ===
Courses are open to doctors who have completed the Foundation Programme and is usually taken during ST1-3 or CT1-2 training. Courses run throughout the year in regional centres across the UK, and until late 2020 at RCS Partner centres in London and Manchester.

=== Australia and New Zealand ===
The Royal Australasian College of Surgeons requires surgical trainees to complete CCrISP within the first 2 years of training (SET 1-2). The course is also mandatory for trainees in oral and maxillofacial surgery.

=== Ireland ===
The Royal College of Surgeons in Ireland recommends at least 6 months of general surgery training before taking the course. Irish courses are aimed at surgical trainees in the second year of Basic Surgical Training (ST2). Candidates must be registered with the Medical Council (Ireland) or the General Medical Council.

== Content ==
The course runs with a maximum of 16 students and 9 faculty, one of whom will be a Course Director. Ideally, the ratio of Surgeon to Anaesthetist faculty will be 50/50. Candidates receive a course manual and must pass a pre-course online multiple choice question assessment. Successful participants receive a certificate from the Royal College of Surgeons of England.

The main course elements include:

- Presentation of the critically ill patient
- Assessment and detection of illness
- Formulation of a plan of action
- Seeking assistance and support
- Prevention of complications
- Recognition of complications
- Interaction with colleagues
- Requirements of patients and relatives during critical illness
- Legal, ethical, and communication issues

Theory stations include:

- Cardiac disorders
- Communication skills
- Conducting a surgical ward round
- Pain
- Renal dysfunction
- Respiratory failure
- The multiply injured patient

Practical skills stations include:

- Advanced shock
- Airway management
- Arterial line insertion
- Central venous pressure line insertion
- Chest x-ray interpretation
- Dysrhythmias
- Pressure monitoring
- Stoma care
- Tracheostomy
- Wound assessment

== Assessment ==
CCrISP uses a mix of formative and summative assessment. The pre course online MCQ is summative assessed, whilst the bulk of the two days is formatively assessed. The end of course moulage is summatively assessed, and the students are given a pass / fail mark. Those who fail, either through missing a session, or not passing the moulage, can resit the failed element, but this resit must take place within 6 months of the course. If outside that date the whole course must be repeated.

== Instructor training ==
Surgeons, Anaesthetists or Intensivists wishing to become CCrISP faculty need to be at least Post Graduate year 7 (ST5 in the UK) before they are eligible. There are two route to becoming an instructor, the CCrISP Instructor course and Instructor Candidate. To enrol on the Instructor course participants need to have observed or been a successful student on a CCrISP course. The Instructor course last two days and includes educational theory and practical sessions during which participants simulate a cross section of CCrISP course stations. The Instructor Candidate route requires participants to have completed basic educational training (a two-day intro to training is usually sufficient) or have done another Instructor course with educational content, such as ATLS Instructor. They also need to have seen a CCrISP course or passed one. Once these requirements have been met they act as an instructor on a course and are assessed by the Course Director. If successful they become a CCrISP faculty member.

== See also ==
- ABC (medicine)
- Advanced Cardiac Life Support
- Advanced Life Support
- Advanced trauma life support
- Basic Life Support
- Definitive Surgical Trauma Skills
- Pediatric Advanced Life Support
- Trauma team
- List of emergency medicine courses
