= Critical Care =

Critical Care may refer to:

- Critical care medicine or intensive-care medicine, a branch of medicine concerned with life support for critically ill patients
- "Critical Care" (Star Trek: Voyager), an episode of the TV series
- Critical Care (film), a 1997 film directed by Sidney Lumet
- Critical Care, a novel by Richard Dooling; basis for the film
- Critical Care (journal), an online journal of intensive care medicine published by BioMed Central
- Critical Care Medicine, published by Lippincott Williams & Wilkins for the Society of Critical Care Medicine

== See also ==
- Intensive Care (disambiguation)
