= Peter van der Voort =

Dutch physician and politician (born 1964)

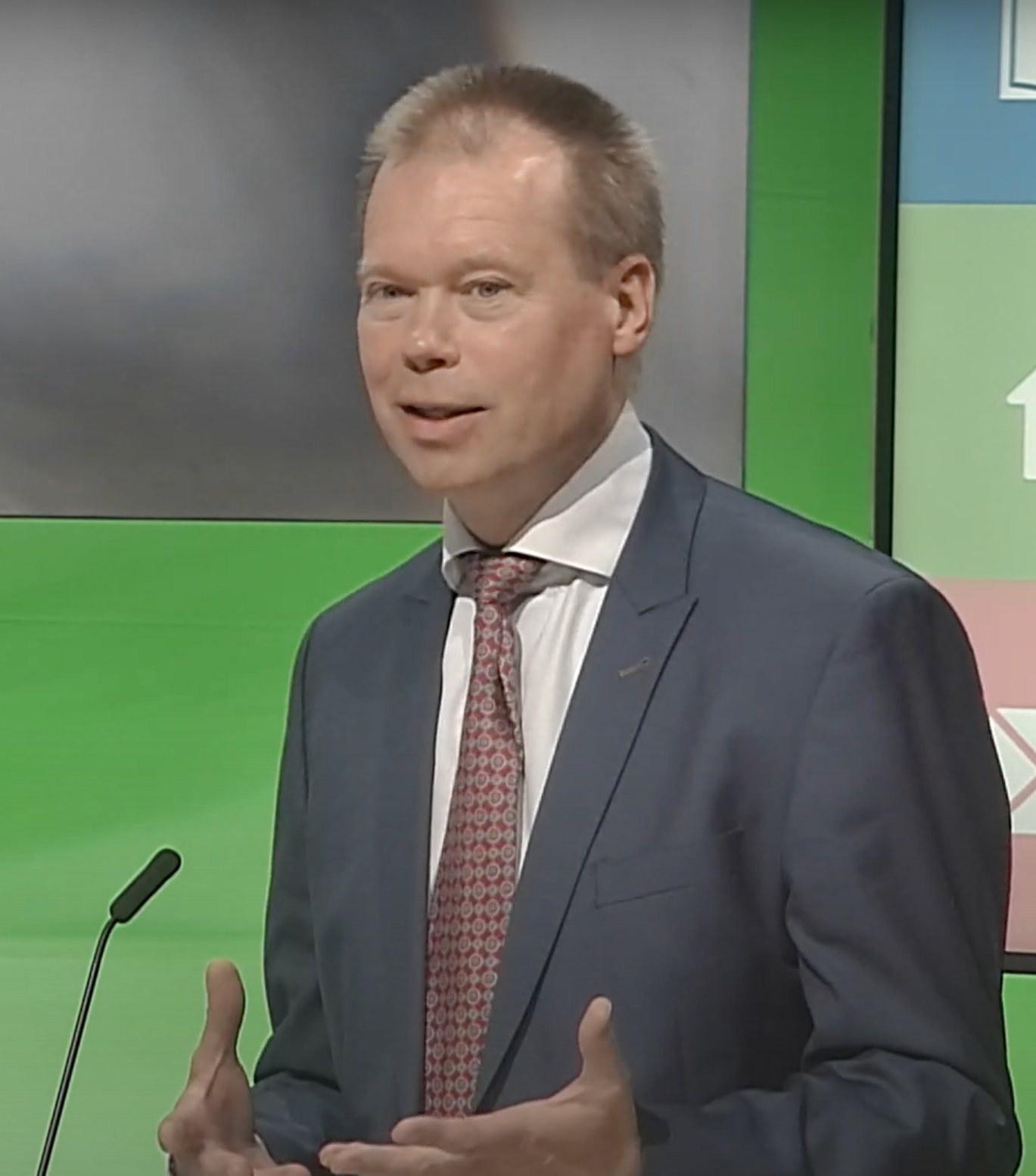

Member of the Senate
- In office 4 February 2020 – 13 June 2023
- Preceded by: Alexandra van Huffelen

Personal details
- Born: Petrus Henricus Johannes van der Voort; 29 September 1964 (age 62) Haarlem, Netherlands
- Party: Democrats 66
- Children: 3
- Education: Vrije Universiteit Amsterdam, University of Amsterdam
- Occupation: Intensivist, professor

Petrus Henricus Johannes "Peter" van der Voort (born 29 September 1964) is a Dutch physician, professor, and politician serving as a member of the Senate between 2020 and 2023. He is a member of the social-liberal party Democrats 66 (D66).

He was trained as an intensivist and has led the intensive care units of three hospitals. He is currently employed by the University Medical Center Groningen. He has also been involved in medical science since he received his doctorate. Van der Voort has been the head of an executive master at TIAS School for Business and Society since 2013. His research has focused on the improvement of intensive care quality and the effect of organizational change on the field.

== Early life and education ==
Van der Voort was born on 29 September 1964 in Haarlem. There, he attended the high school Coornhert Lyceum before studying medicine between 1982 and 1990 at the Vrije Universiteit Amsterdam. Van der Voort started a six-year training in internal medicine the following year at the Academic Medical Center and the Onze Lieve Vrouwe Gasthuis (OLVG), both situated in Amsterdam. Starting in 1996, he also received two years of education in the field of intensive care medicine at the OLVG. He earned a European Diploma in Intensive Care in 1998 and received his doctor's degree from the University of Amsterdam in 1999, after three years of study and finishing his dissertation titled Helicobacter pylori in the critically ill patient.

He studied again at the Vrije Universiteit Amsterdam between 2004 and 2006, receiving a Master of Science degree in epidemiology.

== Career ==
After finishing his intensive care training, Van der Voort started working as an intensivist at the Medical Center Leeuwarden in 1998, serving for some years as head of the division. He returned to the OLVG in 2006, working as medical director and educating co-workers and residents.

In March 2013, Van der Voort became academic director of the executive master Health Administration at the Utrecht campus of TIAS School for Business and Society, which is affiliated with Tilburg University, next to his job at the OLVG. He also became a professor specialized in health care at Tilburg University in July 2014.

He became involved in politics in 2017 when he became a member of the board of D66 in Friesland. As a board member, Van der Voort has served as interim-president of the organization for a few months (2019–2020). He appeared ninth on the D66's party list during the 2019 Dutch Senate election. His party won seven seats, and Van der Voort received two preferential votes out of the 50 votes the party was given – not enough to be elected senator.

Van der Voort left the OLVG to start working at the University Medical Center Groningen (UMCG) in October 2019 in the position of intensivist and head of the adult intensive care division. Besides that job, he also became a professor in the field of intensive care at the start of 2020 at the University of Groningen, to which the UMCG is affiliated.

He was appointed as a member of the Senate in 2020 to succeed Alexandra van Huffelen because of his position on the party list during the previous election. Van Huffelen had vacated her seat because of her new position as State Secretary for Finance after the resignation of Menno Snel. Van der Voort was sworn in on 4 February. He remained in his other positions, namely as intensivist and professor in Groningen and as professor and academic director in Utrecht. In the Senate, Van der Voort is his party's spokesperson for higher education, finances, and health care, and he is a member of the Committees for Finances; for Education, Culture, and Science; and for Public Health, Welfare, and Sport.

=== COVID-19 pandemic ===
The COVID-19 pandemic, that reached the Netherlands in February 2020, hit the northern provinces less severe. Because of that, patients from other provinces were brought in to be treated at UMCG's intensive care unit led by Van der Voort. The capacity was raised from about 35 to 112 within a month starting at the end of March. After the end of the first wave of infections, the number of beds was returned to slightly above the initial level in such a way that it can be scaled up again.

During two discussions on talk show Jinek, Van der Voort drew attention to the fact that around 90% of COVID-19 patients at the UMCG's intensive care unit were overweight or obese. He subsequently co-authored a scientific paper that found that obese COVID-19 patients with respiratory failure had higher levels of leptin in their blood compared to an obese control group. Van der Voort hypothesized that this might be a contributing factor to respiratory failure among people with COVID-19 and that the dietary supplement resveratrol might help prevent this. In August, the UMCG's research he led into the relation between COVID-19 and obesity received €450,000 in funding. When vaccinations had started, Van der Voort unsuccessfully proposed first vaccinating men between the ages of 50 and 75 with overweight and obesity in order to decrease the number of intensive care patients. He continued to warn for a shortage of intensive care beds, signing a declaration in October 2021 with seven colleagues, in which they called on politicians and citizens to do everything in their power to limit the number of COVID-19 infections. However, in a later stage of the pandemic, Van der Voort said that a balance had to be found between the burden of COVID-19 patients on hospitals and the psychological damage to society caused by lockdowns and other measures.

=== Continued political career ===
Van der Voort was picked by the political party SAM as informateur to advise on a new governing coalition in his home municipality of Waadhoeke following local elections held on 16 March 2022. He suggested a coalition consisting of SAM, Gemeentebelangen, and the Frisian National Party (FNP) on 1 April, and an agreement was eventually signed over a month later. Van der Voort sought re-election to the Senate in 2023 and was placed eighth on D66's party list. D66 received five seats, causing Van der Voort's term to end on 13 June.

== Other positions ==
Van der Voort has been involved in a number of organizations related to intensive care next to his job. His first such position was as member of the board of the National Intensive Care Evaluation (NICE), a Dutch organization collecting data from intensive care units, between 1998 and 2010. He was the chairman of Venticare, an education foundation for intensive care, between 2004 and 2017, and he was chair of the Indicator Commission of the Dutch Commission for Intensive Care (NVIC).

Currently, Van der Voort serves as the chair of the task force group Health Economics of the European Society of Intensive Care Medicine (ESICM) (since October 2016) and as secretary of the Joint Intensivist Commission (since September 2017). The latter consults intensive care educators.

== Personal life ==
Van der Voort resides in the village Boksum in the province Friesland. He has a wife and three children.

== Electoral history ==
Electoral history of Peter van der Voort
Year	Body	Party	Pos.	Votes	Result		Ref.
Year	Body	Party	Pos.	Votes	Party seats	Individual	Ref.
2023	House of Representatives	Democrats 66	69	76	9	Lost	

== Selected publications ==
=== Scientific ===
- van den Bemt PM, Fijn R, van der Voort PH, Gossen AA, Egberts TC, Brouwers JR (April 2002). "Frequency and determinants of drug administration errors in the intensive care unit". Critical Care Medicine. 30 (4): 846–850. doi:10.1097/00003246-200204000-00022. PMID 11940757. S2CID 36547061.
- Boerma EC, Mathura KR, van der Voort PH, Spronk PE, Ince C (September 2005). "Quantifying bedside-derived imaging of microcirculatory abnormalities in septic patients: a prospective validation study". Critical Care. 9 (6) R601: R601-6. doi:10.1186/cc3809. PMC 1414044. PMID 16280059.
- de Jonge E, Peelen L, Keijzers PJ, Joore H, de Lange D, van der Voort PH, Bosman RJ, de Waal RA, Wesselink R, de Keizer NF (December 2008). "Association between administered oxygen, arterial partial oxygen pressure and mortality in mechanically ventilated intensive care unit patients". Critical Care. 12 (6) R156. doi:10.1186/cc7150. PMC 2646321. PMID 19077208.
- van der Voort PH, Boerma EC, Koopmans M, Zandberg M, de Ruiter J, Gerritsen RT, Egbers PH, Kingma WP, Kuiper MA (February 2009). "Furosemide does not improve renal recovery after hemofiltration for acute renal failure in critically ill patients: a double blind randomized controlled trial". Critical Care Medicine. 37 (2): 533–538. doi:10.1097/CCM.0b013e318195424d. PMID 19114909. S2CID 205537058.
- Oudemans-van Straaten HM, Bosman RJ, Koopmans M, van der Voort PH, Wester JP, van der Spoel JI, Dijksman LM, Zandstra DF (February 2009). "Citrate anticoagulation for continuous venovenous hemofiltration". Critical Care Medicine. 37 (2): 545–552. doi:10.1097/CCM.0b013e3181953c5e. PMID 19114912. S2CID 5396279.
- van den Boogaard M, Pickkers P, Slooter AJ, Kuiper MA, Spronk PE, van der Voort PH, van der Hoeven JG, Donders R, van Achterberg T, Schoonhoven L (February 2012). "Development and validation of PRE-DELIRIC (PREdiction of DELIRium in ICu patients) delirium prediction model for intensive care patients: observational multicentre study". The BMJ. 344: e420. doi:10.1097/CCM.0b013e3181953c5e. PMC 3276486. PMID 22323509.

=== Books ===
- (2012, Venticare) Nieren en nierfunctievervanging op de IC: Een praktische handleiding (Kidneys and renal function replacement on the ICU: a practical guide; ISBN 978-90-72651-29-7 / ISBN 978-90-72651-36-5 (2018 revised edition))
- (2018, Venticare) Infecties, bacteriën en antibiotica op de IC: Een praktische handleiding (Infections, bacteria and antibiotics on the ICU: a practical guide; ISBN 978-90-72651-37-2)
- With Nardo van der Meer and Mirella Minkman (2023, Boom) Zorg voor transitie: Naar passend leiden, organiseren en waarderen in de gezondheidszorg (Care for the transition: towards appropriate leadership, organization, and valuation of health care; ISBN 978-90-24451-68-5)
