= Surgical emergency =

Medical emergency requiring immediate intervention

Surgical emergency is a medical emergency for which immediate surgical intervention is the only way to solve the problem successfully.

The following conditions are surgical emergencies:

- Acute trauma

== Cardiothoracic ==
- Cardiac tamponade
- Acute airway obstruction
- Pneumothorax

== Gastrointestinal ==
- Acute appendicitis
- Bowel obstruction
- Gastrointestinal perforation
- Intestinal volvulus
- Acute mesenteric ischemia
- Peritonitis
- Stercoral perforation

== Genitourinary ==
- Testicular torsion
- Urinary retention
- Paraphimosis
- Priapism

== Gynaecological ==
- Ovarian torsion
- Bleeding ectopic pregnancy
- Retained abortion

== Neurological/Ophthalmic ==
- Acute subdural hematoma
- Retinal detachment

== Vascular ==
- Ruptured aortic aneurysm
- Aortic dissection
- Internal bleeding
- Limb ischemia

== See also ==
- List of medical emergencies
- Advanced Trauma Life Support
