= Sapna Kudchadkar =

American critical care physician

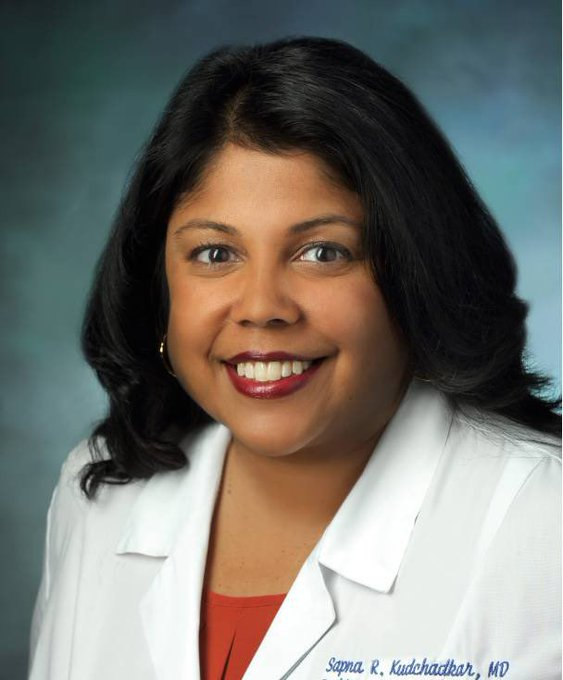
- Born: Georgia, USA
- Occupation: physician
- Spouse: Raj Kudchadkar

Academic background
- Education: B.A, biochemistry and French, 1999, Washington University in St. Louis MD., 2003, Pritzker School of Medicine PhD, clinical investigation, 2018, Johns Hopkins Bloomberg School of Public Health
- Thesis: Healing Environments for Critically Ill Children: Development of a multidisciplinary and integrated approach to sleep, sedation, delirium and early mobilization (2018)

Academic work
- Institutions: Johns Hopkins School of Medicine

Sapna Ravi Kudchadkar is an American critical care physician and anesthesiologist. She is a professor of anesthesiology and critical care medicine, pediatrics and physical medicine and rehabilitation at the Johns Hopkins School of Medicine. In 2022, she was appointed Vice Chair of Pediatric Anesthesiology and Critical Care Medicine at Johns Hopkins as well as Anesthesiologist-in-Chief of the Johns Hopkins Charlotte R. Bloomberg Children's Center.

== Early life and education ==
Kudchadkar was born to parents Shaila and Kananur Ravi and grew up in Illinois with a younger brother. Her parents were originally from Bangalore, India. Kudchadkar enrolled at Washington University in St. Louis for her undergraduate degrees in biochemistry and French before earning her medical degree from the University of Chicago's Pritzker School of Medicine.

Upon earning her medical degree, Kudchadkar completed her residencies in pediatrics and anesthesiology at the Johns Hopkins Children's Center and Johns Hopkins Hospital, followed by clinical fellowships in pediatric critical care and pediatric anesthesiology in the Division of Pediatric Anesthesiology and Critical Care Medicine. While completing her fellowship training, she began to study how children slept in the Intensive care unit (ICU) and the quality of their sleep versus sedation.

== Career ==
After completing her residency and fellowship training, Kudchadkar joined the Department of Anesthesiology & Critical Care Medicine at Johns Hopkins School of Medicine as an assistant professor. She continued to study sleep in the ICU which led to the publication of Sleep of Critically Ill Children in the Pediatric Intensive Care Unit: A Systematic Review and Sedation, Sleep Promotion, and Delirium Screening Practices in the Care of Mechanically Ventilated Children: A Wake-up Call for the Pediatric Critical Care Community. In 2013, Kudchadkar and a team of researchers developed the PICU Up! Early Rehabilitation and Progressive Mobility Program, studying infants and teenagers admitted into their Pediatric Intensive Care Unit (PICU). She found that children who exercised or moved were more likely to get a higher quality of sleep. This led to the development of a program which enabled children in the PICU to move, walk, or play, with the goal of getting better sleep and decreased muscle weakness. Kudchadkar published her findings in the Pediatric Critical Care Medicine and did follow-up testing through a randomized controlled trial. In April 2013, Kudchadkar received the Alfred Sommer Scholar award at the Johns Hopkins Bloomberg School of Public Health to aid in the completion of her PhD. The award is given to those "who exemplify scientific excellence, energy, ambition, political acumen and a determination to change the world."

While serving as director of the Johns Hopkins PICU Clinical Research Program, Kudchadkar teamed up with the Department of Biomedical Engineering to develop a walker to assist critically ill patients in the PICU. The walker was designed to hold multiple medical devices connected to a patient so the patient could participate in PICU Up! In the same year, Kudchadkar was promoted to associate professor and was recognized in Baltimore Magazine's Top Doctors Guide for 2017. Kudchadkar became the lead investigator for the PARK-PICU Study (Prevalence of Acute Rehab for Kids in the PICU), an international point prevalence study including over 200 hospitals in North America, Europe, Brazil, Australia, and New Zealand. The study in America included 82 hospitals and 1800 patients in PICUs across the country and showed that 19% of all critically ill children were completely immobile. The EU PARK-PICU study in 15 European countries had similar findings. Building on this data and the Johns Hopkins PICU Up! program, Kudchadkar founded a pilot multicenter trial of the PICU Up! intervention in children's hospitals in the United States.

During the COVID-19 pandemic in Maryland, Kudchadkar led the curation of pediatric critical care content on Twitter to enable the rapid dissemination of information among healthcare providers. The results of this work was published in the journal Pediatric Critical Care Medicine. She also worked in Johns Hopkins COVID-19 care unit after recovering from the virus herself. Once she began to show symptoms, Kudchadkar self-isolated herself in her bedroom and kept an update on Twitter using the hashtag #SapnasCOVIDDiary. She was one of the first 200 COVID-19 cases to be diagnosed in Maryland.

In 2022, she was appointed Vice Chair of Pediatric Anesthesiology and Critical Care Medicine at Johns Hopkins as well as Anesthesiologist-in-Chief of the Johns Hopkins Children's Center. In 2024, she was promoted to Full Professor of anesthesiology, critical care medicine, and physical medicine and rehabilitation.
