= Code Purple =

Code Purple can mean:

- the US Environmental Protection Agency code for an air quality index between 201 and 300
- a hospital emergency code
- The US codename for the Japanese Type B Cipher Machine
