= Intensive Care (disambiguation) =

Intensive Care may refer to:

- Intensive Care (album), a 2005 album by Robbie Williams
- Intensive Care (1991 film), a Dutch horror film
- Intensive Care (2022 film), a Russian drama film
- "Intensive Care" (Johnny Bravo), a 1997 American animated television series episode

== See also ==
- Critical Care (disambiguation)
- Intensive care medicine
- Intensive Care Medicine (journal)
