= HEICS =

HEICS may refer to:

- Honourable East India Company Service
- Hospital Emergency Incident Command System
