= Slow code =

Deliberately delayed resuscitation attempt

Slow code refers to the practice in a hospital or other medical centre to purposely respond slowly or incompletely to a patient in cardiac arrest, particularly in situations for which cardiopulmonary resuscitation (CPR) is thought to be of no medical benefit by the medical staff. The related term show code refers to the practice of a medical response that is medically futile, but is attempted for the benefit of the patient's family and loved ones. However, the terms are often used interchangeably.

The practices are banned in some jurisdictions.

== Background ==
During a patient cardiac arrest in a hospital or other medical facility, staff may be notified via a code blue alert. A medical response team, based on the institution's practices and policies, attends to the emergency. The team will perform life saving measures, including CPR, in order to re-establish both cardiac and pulmonary function.

Cardiopulmonary resuscitation may be withheld in some circumstances. One is if the patient has a do not resuscitate ("no code") order, such as in a living will. Another is if the patient, family member, individual with power of attorney privileges over the patient, or other surrogate decision maker for the patient, makes such a request of the medical staff. Surrogate decision makers are considered in a hierarchy: legal guardians with health care authority, individual with power of attorney for health decisions, spouse, adult children, parents, and adult siblings.

A third situation is one in which the medical staff deems that CPR will be of no clinical benefit to the patient. This includes, among other cases: a patient in severe septic shock and/or multiple organ dysfunction syndrome whose organ damage cannot be contained and reversed any longer, one who has had an acute stroke that has irreversibly damaged vital brain functions needed for life beyond repair (i.e., in the brain stem), or who has advanced and incurable metastatic cancer, and one with severe pneumonia which is no longer treatable with assisted ventilation methods and medication, which all have very little or no realistic probability of success. There is also a low probability of success for patients with severe hypotension that resulted from shock or severe illness or injury, and has not responded to treatment (and which was not induced), severe cases of acute or chronic kidney failure or end stage kidney disease (where dialysis and other renal replacement therapies either are no longer working or were not adequate, and where a transplant either cannot be found or is not an option), end-stage AIDS and its accompanying severe opportunistic illnesses (which are not responding to antiretroviral and drug therapy and/or the white blood cell count is too low), or those who are older than about 70 and/or homebound (where they and/or their guardians, instead of a DNR order, have authorized such half measures and the law permits it).

A patient may request, in an advance directive, to prohibit certain responses, including intubation, chest compression, electrical defibrillation, or ACLS. This is referred to as a partial code or partial resuscitation and such resuscitation "commonly violates the ethical obligation of nonmalfeasance". It is regarded as medically unsound because partial interventions are "often highly traumatic and consistently inefficacious".

== Ethics ==
The practice is "controversial from an ethical point of view", as it represents a violation of a patient's trust and right "to be involved in inpatient clinical decisions".

In a position paper, the American Nurses Association states that "slow codes are not ethical".

== Policy and legislation ==
Some medical services centres have instituted policy banning the practice.

In 1987, New York became the first state in the United States to effectively end the practice by enacting legislation to require medical staff to honour a patient's refusal of cardiopulmonary resuscitation or a do not resuscitate order, and to grant civil and criminal immunity to those who do so or those who perform CPR without knowledge of the order.
