= Hospital emergency codes =

Phrases used over a public address system

Hospital emergency codes are coded messages often announced over a public address system of a hospital to alert staff to various classes of on-site emergencies. The use of codes is intended to convey essential information quickly and with minimal misunderstanding to staff while preventing stress and panic among visitors to the hospital. Such codes are sometimes posted on placards throughout the hospital or are printed on employee identification badges for ready reference.

Hospital emergency codes have varied widely by location, even between hospitals in the same community. Confusion over these codes has led to the proposal for and sometimes adoption of standardised codes. In many American, Canadian, and Australian hospitals, for example "code blue" indicates a patient has entered cardiac arrest, while "code red" indicates that a fire has broken out somewhere in the hospital.

In order for a code call to be useful in activating the response of specific hospital personnel to a given situation, it is usually accompanied by a specific location description (e.g., "Code red, second floor, corridor three, room two-twelve"). Other codes, however, only signal hospital staff generally to prepare for the consequences of some external event such as a natural disaster.

== Summary ==
This table is a simplified summary of the emergency codes documented in this article. Note that there may be additional nuances to meaning and cause in individual regions, and some uncommon codes or callouts are omitted for brevity. More information is given in other sections.

	Australia	Canada								United States																United Kingdom
	Australia	Alberta	British Columbia	Manitoba	Nova Scotia	Ontario	Quebec	Saskatchewan	Yukon	Arizona	California	Colorado	Florida	Kansas	Kentucky	Hawaii	Louisiana	Maryland	North Carolina	New Hampshire	Ohio	Oregon	Rhode Island	(Washington (state)) Washington	West Virginia	United Kingdom
Code red	Fire																									Rapid response (External disaster or mass casualty event)
Code pink	Pediatric or obstetrical emergency	(unused)	Pediatric or obstetrical emergency	Child abduction	Pediatric or obstetrical emergency			(unused)	(unused)	Child abduction					(unused)	Child abduction				(unused)	Pediatric or obstetrical emergency	(unused)	(unused)	(unused)	(unused)	(unused)
Code orange	Evacuation	External disaster or mass casualty event								Hazardous material										Hazardous material						(unused)
Code amber	(unused)	(unused)	Child abduction	(unused)	(unused)	Child abduction	(unused)	(unused)	(unused)	(unused)	(unused)	(unused)	(unused)	(unused)	(unused)	(unused)	(unused)	(unused)	(unused)	Missing patient	Child abduction					(unused)
Code yellow	Internal emergency	Missing patient								Bomb threat		(unused)	(unused)	(unused)	External disaster or mass casualty event	(unused)	External disaster or mass casualty event		(unused)	(unused)	External disaster or mass casualty event	(unused)	Trauma	(unused)	(unused)	(unused)
Code green	Urgent Caesarean section	Evacuation								(unused)	Missing patient	(unused)	Internal emergency	(unused)	(unused)	Bomb threat	(unused)	Unarmed violence	(unused)	(unused)	(unused)	(unused)	Bomb threat	(unused)	(unused)	(unused)
Code blue	Cardiac, respiratory, or other life-threatening medical emergency																									(unused)
Code purple	Bomb threat	Hostage situation	(unused)	(unused)	(unused)	Hostage situation	Pediatric or obstetrical emergency	Hostage situation	(unused)	Child abduction	(unused)	(unused)	(unused)	(unused)	(unused)	(unused)	(unused)	(unused)	(unused)	External disaster or mass casualty event	(unused)	(unused)	External disaster or mass casualty event	(unused)	(unused)	(unused)
Code brown	External disaster or mass casualty event	Hazardous material								(unused)	(unused)	(unused)	(unused)	(unused)	(unused)	(unused)	(unused)	(unused)	(unused)	(unused)	(unused)	(unused)	(unused)	(unused)	(unused)	(unused)
Code white	(unused)	Unarmed violence								(unused)	(unused)	(unused)	(unused)	(unused)	(unused)	(unused)	(unused)	(unused)	(unused)	(unused)	(unused)	(unused)	(unused)	(unused)	(unused)	(unused)
Code grey	Unarmed violence	Shelter in place	System failure	Shelter in place		System failure / Shelter in place	(unused)	(unused)	Shelter in place	Unarmed violence				(unused)	(unused)	Unarmed violence	Severe weather	Missing patient	(unused)	Unarmed violence	Severe weather	Unarmed violence				(unused)
Code silver	(unused)	(unused)	Armed violence	(unused)	Armed violence				(unused)	Armed violence			(unused)	Armed violence		(unused)	Armed violence		(unused)	Armed violence		(unused)	Armed violence	(unused)	(unused)	(unused)
Code black	Armed violence	Bomb threat								(unused)	(unused)	Bomb threat				Severe weather	Bomb threat	(unused)	(unused)	Bomb threat		(unused)	(unused)	(unused)	(unused)	At capacity
MET call	Non-life-threatening medical emergency	(unused)	(unused)	(unused)	(unused)	(unused)	(unused)	(unused)	(unused)	(unused)	(unused)	(unused)	(unused)	(unused)	(unused)	(unused)	(unused)	(unused)	(unused)	(unused)	(unused)	(unused)	(unused)	(unused)	(unused)	(unused)

== Standardised colour codes ==
=== Australia ===
Australian hospitals and other buildings are covered by Australian Standard 4083 (1997)

- Code black: security needed, someone is armed, and is a threat to themselves or others
- Code grey: security needed, someone is unarmed, and is a threat to themselves or others
- Code blue: life-threatening medical emergency
- Code brown: external emergency (disaster, mass casualties, etc.)
- Code orange: evacuation
- Code purple: bomb threat
- Code red: fire
- Code yellow: internal emergency
- MET call: a medical emergency that is not cardiac or respiratory arrest; not a code blue situation, but one that may escalate to code blue
- Code pink: a mother is going into labour unexpectedly, or there is a newborn medical emergency,
- Code green: in some hospitals, indicates an urgent Caesarean section

=== Canada ===
==== Alberta ====
Codes in Alberta are prescribed by Alberta Health Services.

- Code black: bomb threat/suspicious package
- Code blue: cardiac arrest/medical emergency
- Code brown: chemical spill/hazardous material
- Code green: evacuation
- Code grey: shelter in place/air exclusion
- Code orange: mass casualty incident
- Code purple: hostage situation
- Code red: fire
- Code white: violence/aggression
- Code yellow: missing patient
- Code 66: rapid medical intervention to prevent the patient deteriorating

==== British Columbia ====
Codes used in British Columbia, prescribed by the British Columbia Ministry of Health.

- Code amber: missing or abducted infant or child
- Code black: bomb threat
- Code blue: cardiac or respiratory arrest
- Code brown: hazardous spill
- Code green: evacuation
- Code grey: system failure
- Code orange: disaster or mass casualties
- Code pink: paediatric emergency or obstetrical emergency
- Code red: fire
- Code white: aggression
- Code yellow: missing patient
- Code silver: active shooter
- Code purple: neonatal resuscitation
- Code 77: stroke
- Code 99: incoming trauma

==== Manitoba ====
Codes used in Manitoba as defined in WRHA policy,"Codes: Standardised Emergency"; policy No. 50.00.010

- Code red: fire
- Code blue: cardiopulmonary arrest
- Code orange: disaster (external influx of patients)
- Code green: evacuation
- Code yellow: missing patient/resident
- Code black: bomb threat/search
- Code white: violent incident
- Code brown: internal chemical spill
- Code grey: external air contamination (exclusion)
- Code pink: abduction (infant, child, dependant adult)
- Code 25: medical emergency

==== Nova Scotia ====
The following codes are in use in Nova Scotia.

- Code black: bomb threat
- Code blue: cardio/respiratory arrest, choking, or other life-threatening emergency
- Code brown: hazardous substance spill/release
- Code census: emergency department overcrowding
- Code green precautionary: evacuation (precautionary)
- Code green stat: evacuation (crisis)
- Code grey: external air exclusion/shelter in place
- Code orange: external disaster/reception of mass casualties
- Code pink: paediatric emergency and/or obstetrical emergency
- Code red: fire
- Code silver: person with a weapon
- Code white: violent person/situation
- Code yellow: missing patient/client

==== Ontario ====
In Ontario, a standard emergency colour code system is used, with minor variations for some hospitals. Additional clinical codes may exist in specific hospitals, such as code stroke, code trauma, code 99, etc.

- Code amber: missing child/child abduction
- Code black: bomb threat/suspicious object
- Code blue: cardiac arrest/medical emergency
- Code brown: in-facility hazardous spill
- Code green: evacuation (precautionary)
- Code green stat: evacuation (crisis)
- Code grey: infrastructure loss or failure
- Code grey button-down: external air exclusion
- Code orange: external disaster
- Code orange CBRN: CBRN (chemical, biological, radiological, and nuclear) disaster
- Code pink: cardiac arrest/medical emergency – infant/child
- Code purple: hostage taking
- Code red: fire
- Code silver: active attacker
- Code white: violent/behavioural situation
- Code yellow: missing person

==== Quebec ====
The following codes are in use in Quebec.

- Code black: bomb threat/suspicious object
- Code blue: adult cardiac or respiratory arrest, loss of consciousness
- Code brown: in-facility hazardous spill
- Code green: evacuation
- Code orange: external disaster
- Code pink: paediatric cardiac or respiratory arrest, loss of consciousness
- Code purple/lavender: infant/neonatal cardiac or respiratory arrest
- Code red: fire
- Code white: violent patient
- Code yellow: missing or lost patient
- Code silver: active shooter

==== Saskatchewan ====
Codes used in Saskatchewan, prescribed by the Saskatchewan Health Authority.

- Code red: fire and water
- Code orange: incoming casualties/expanded services
- Code green: evacuation/relocation
- Code black: bomb threat/suspicious package
- Code purple: hostage taking
- Code white: aggressive/hostile/combative person
- Code yellow: missing person
- Code blue: cardiac/respiratory arrest
- Code brown: hazardous material/chemical spill
- Code silver: active assailant/person with a weapon

==== Yukon ====
The following codes are in use in Yukon.

- Code black: bomb threat
- Code blue: cardiac or respiratory arrest
- Code brown: hazardous material
- Code gold: earthquake (Yukon has the highest seismic activity rate in Canada)
- Code green stage 1: partial evacuation to a safe area within the building
- Code green stage 2: complete evacuation of the building
- Code grey: shelter in place/air exclusion
- Code orange: mass casualty
- Code red: fire
- Code white: aggressive behaviour
- Lockdown: violent situation/hostage taking
- Code yellow: missing patient

=== United Kingdom ===
In the UK, hospitals have standardised codes across individual NHS trusts (England and Wales) and health boards (Scotland), but there are not many standardised codes across the entire NHS. This allows for differences in demands on hospitals in different areas, and also for hospitals of different roles to communicate different alerts according to their needs (e.g., a major trauma centre like St. George's Hospital in South London has different priority alert needs to a rural community hospital like West Berkshire Community Hospital). Some more standardised codes are as follows:

- Code black: hospital at capacity – no available beds for new admissions from A&E. A code black is declared by the hospital's general bed manager, who then relays this to the local ambulance service and posts updates for local healthcare services such as GPs and district nursing teams.
- Code red: This is the United Kingdom's rapid response code. This call gets specialist doctors and trauma teams to the location for assistance in things like major traumas and deteriorating patients in situations like choking or airway compromise. This call also can be used to activate a major hemorrhage protocol in the event of a massive bleed. This call is referred to as code red, staff assist, trauma protocol or rapid response. This is the only emergency protocol which has a code. The only other is what is announced as a mass casualty protocol not any codes. This is to show a major incident has taken place like a terrorist attack and the protocol is activated to alert specialists and begin special emergency procedures like mass casualty triage and decontamination.
- Major haemorrhage protocol: activated via the code red system. A peri-arrest call is put out, but the transfusion lab is also alerted. A specified number of units of O-negative packed red blood cells, and sometimes fresh frozen plasma and platelets, are immediately sent to the location of the call. The transfusion lab will cross-match any saved blood samples for the patient, or await an urgent cross-match sample to be sent. Once this is done, units matching the patient's blood type will be continually sent until the major haemorrhage protocol is stood down.

Otherwise, non-colour codes are mostly used across the NHS:

- 2222 (crash call or peri-arrest call): dialling 2222 from any internal phone in nearly all NHS hospitals will connect the caller immediately to the switchboard. The caller can then specify the type of cardiac arrest or peri-arrest call (usually adult, paediatric (or neonatal) or obstetric) and give a location (eg "Adult cardiac arrest, Surgical Admissions Unit, ground floor B block" or "Obstetric peri-arrest, obstetric theatres, 4th floor maternity wing") and the switchboard will bleep the members of the relevant cardiac arrest or peri-arrest team. Some UK hospitals do not have a peri-arrest team, and the cardiac arrest team can be used for urgent medical emergencies where cardiac arrest is imminent.
- 3333 (security alert)
- 4444 (fire alert)
- "Fast bleep" codes: a 2222 call for a specific member of staff. For example, in status epilepticus, it is not necessary to call the crash team (as is done in cardiac arrest) but a fast bleep can be made to the on-call anaesthetist to come urgently.
- Trauma call:
  - adult (trauma centres only): usually called over a PA system across the emergency department, triggering a "trauma call" paging request to all members of the trauma team: including a trauma surgeon and senior members their surgical team, an anaesthetist and ODP, emergency medicine consultant or registrar and members of their team (this will be usually be an FY1 or SHO). Trauma calls are similar to "resus codes" used in the US.
  - paediatric (trauma centres only): triggers a "trauma call" paging request to all members of the paediatric trauma team – including a trauma surgeon and senior members of their surgical team, often additionally a paediatric surgeon, a paediatric anaesthetist, ODP, (paediatric) emergency medicine consultant or registrar and members of their team (this will be usually be an FY1 or SHO).

=== United States ===
In 2000, the Hospital Association of Southern California (HASC) determined that a uniform code system was needed after three people were killed in a shooting incident at a hospital after the wrong emergency code was called. While codes for fire (red) and medical emergency (blue) were similar in 90% of California hospitals queried, 47 different codes were used for infant abduction and 61 for combative person. In light of this, the HASC published a handbook titled Healthcare Facility Emergency Codes: A Guide for Code Standardization listing various codes and has strongly urged hospitals to voluntarily implement the revised codes.

In 2003, Maryland mandated that all acute hospitals in the state have uniform codes.

In 2008, the Oregon Association of Hospitals & Health Systems, Oregon Patient Safety Commission, and Washington State Hospital Association formed a taskforce to standardise emergency code calls. After both states had conducted a survey of all hospital members, the task force found many hospitals used the same code for fire (code red); however, there were tremendous variations for codes representing respiratory and cardiac arrest, infant and child abduction, and combative persons.

Consistent across the thirteen states with uniform codes as of 2020 were code red (fire), code blue (cardiac arrest and/or medical emergency), and code orange (hazardous material spill/release). Some other colour codes used in multiple states are listed in the table below. Of these, only Maryland's code is mandatory as of 2020.

Hospital emergency colours codes
State	Yellow	Grey	Silver	Pink	Black	Purple	Green	Adam/Amber
Arizona	Bomb threat	Combative Person	Weapon/hostage	Infant abduction				
California	Bomb threat	Combative Person	Weapon/hostage	Infant abduction		Child abduction	Patient elopement	
Colorado		Combative Person	Weapon	Infant/child abduction	Bomb threat			
Florida		Security response		Infant/child abduction	Bomb threat		EOP activation	
Kansas			Armed intruder	Infant abduction	Bomb threat			
Kentucky	Disaster Plan Activation		Weapon/hostage		Bomb threat			
Hawaii		Security assistance		Infant abduction	Severe weather		Bomb threat	
Louisiana	Disaster/mass Casualty	Severe weather	Active shooter/ weapon	Infant/child abduction	Bomb threat			
Maryland	Emergency/ Disaster	Elopement	Armed assailant	Infant/child abduction			Combative person	
North Carolina				Missing infant/child				Missing child
New Hampshire		Combative Person	Active shooter		Bomb threat	Surge		Missing person
Ohio	Disaster	Severe weather	Weapon/hostage	Child medical emergency	Bomb threat			Infant/child abduction
Oregon		Combative Person						Infant/child abduction
Rhode Island	Trauma patient/team	Security response	Hostile situation/weapon			Infectious event	Bomb threat	Infant/child abduction
Washington		Combative Person						Infant/child abduction
West Virginia		Security/Combative Person/ Weapon/Hostage						Infant/child abduction

Additional codes (not including plain-language codes) include, but are not limited to:

- Code white: paediatric medical emergency, combative person without a weapon, or emergency operating procedures dependent on the state. (Note: Code white refers to a paediatric medical emergency in California, a combative person without a weapon in Louisiana, and emergency operating procedures in New Hampshire.)
- Code gold: bomb threat
- Code brown: missing adult patient
- Code violet: combative person
- Code triage: mass casualty
- Code walker: missing adult patient

==== Plain-language alerts ====
In 2015, the South Carolina Hospital Association formed a work group to develop plain language standardisation code recommendations. Abolishing all colour codes was suggested. In 2016, the Texas Hospital Association encouraged the use of standardised plain language emergency alerts at all Texas hospitals. The only colour code that was still recommended was "code blue," meaning a cardiac arrest.

Plain language alerts are announced using the following format: Alert type + description + location (general to specific) + instructions (if applicable). For example, if a patient in ICU Bed 4 went into cardiac arrest, the alert would be "Medical alert + code blue + second floor + intensive care unit + bed 4."

In January 2025, the Washington State Hospital Association (WSHA) recommended plain-language codes, although it advised keeping the legacy colour codes of "Code Blue" and "Amber Alert." The new system, which is "strongly recommend[ed]" but not required, classifies alerts into "Facility," "Medical," and "Security" alerts.

== Codes ==
Note: Different codes are used in different hospitals.

=== Code blue ===
"Code blue" is used to indicate that a patient requires resuscitation or is in need of immediate medical attention, most often as the result of a respiratory arrest or cardiac arrest. When called overhead, the page takes the form of "Code blue, [floor], [room]" to alert the resuscitation team where to respond. Every hospital, as a part of its disaster plans, sets a policy to determine which units provide personnel for code coverage. In theory any medical professional may respond to a code, but in practice, the team makeup is limited to those with advanced cardiac life support or other equivalent resuscitation training. Frequently these teams are staffed by physicians from anaesthesia, internal medicine or emergency medicine, respiratory therapists, pharmacists, and nurses. A code team leader will be a physician in attendance on any code team; this individual is responsible for directing the resuscitation effort and is said to "run the code".

This phrase was coined at Bethany Medical Centre in Kansas City, Kansas. The term "code" by itself is commonly used by medical professionals as a slang term for this type of emergency, as in "calling a code" or describing a patient in arrest as "coding" or "coded".

- Australian standard
- Californian standard

In some hospitals or other medical facilities, the resuscitation team may purposely respond slowly to a patient in cardiac arrest, a practice known as "slow code", or may fake the response altogether for the sake of the patient's family, a practice known as "show code". Such practices are ethically controversial, and are banned in some jurisdictions.

==== Variations ====
"Plan blue" was used at St. Vincent's Hospital in New York City to indicate arrival of a trauma patient so critically injured that even the short delay of a stop in the A&E for evaluation could be fatal; "plan blue" was called out to alert the surgeon on call to go immediately to the A&E entrance and take the patient for immediate surgery.

=== "Doctor" codes ===
"Doctor" codes are often used in hospital settings for announcements over a general loudspeaker or paging system that might cause panic or endanger a patient's privacy. Most often, "doctor" codes take the form of "Paging Dr. Sinclair", where the doctor's "name" is a code word for a dangerous situation or a patient in crisis, e.g.: "Paging Dr. Firestone, third floor," to indicate a possible fire on the floor specified.

=== "Resus" codes ===
Specific to emergency medicine, incoming patients in immediate danger of life or limb, whether presenting via ambulance or walk-in triage, are paged locally within the emergency department as "roesus" [ri:səs] codes. These codes indicate the type of emergency (general medical, trauma, cardiopulmonary or neurological) and type of patient (adult or paediatric). An estimated time of arrival may be included, or "now" if the patient is already in the department. The patient is transported to the nearest open trauma bay or evaluation room, and is immediately attended by a designated team of physicians and nurses for purposes of immediate stabilisation and treatment.

== See also ==
- Inspector Sands, code used over PA system in British public transport to indicate a serious situation
- Vessel emergency codes codes used on cruise ships.
