= James K. Styner =

American surgeon

James Kenneth Styner
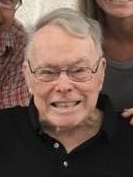
- Styner in 2020
- Born: July 22, 1934; Los Angeles, California, U.S.
- Died: January 22, 2024 (aged 89); Lincoln, Nebraska, U.S.
- Education: University of California - Irvine Medical School
- Occupation: Orthopedic surgeon
- Known for: Creation of Advanced Trauma Life Support (ATLS)
- Spouse(s): Charlene Styner (1966–1976); Lily Styner (1998–2024)
- Children: 4
- Honours: The Annual James K. Styner Award for Meritorious Service from The American Board of Surgeons

James Kenneth Styner FACS (July 22, 1934 – January 22, 2024) was an American orthopedic surgeon who practiced in Lawndale, California. He was instrumental in the development of the advanced trauma life support (ATLS) program after his experiences in a private airplane crash in rural Nebraska.

== Aircraft accident ==
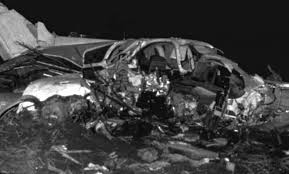
The Beechcraft Baron Plane after the crash

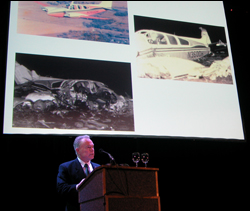
Styner presents the story of his plane crash that led to ATLS

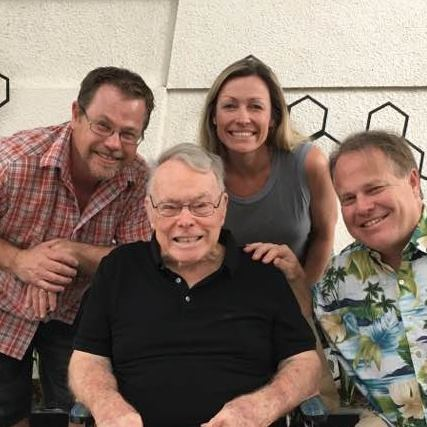
James K Styner with children, all crash survivors

On February 17, 1976, after attending a wedding, Styner flew his private airplane (a 6-seat Beechcraft Baron) from Los Angeles to his home in Lincoln, Nebraska. His wife, Charlene Styner, and their four children were also aboard. They landed in New Mexico to refuel, crossing Texas, Oklahoma, and Kansas on their way home. In Nebraska, they intercepted a low, thin cloud layer. Styner stayed below the clouds but became disoriented and lost altitude. As a result, the plane crashed into a row of trees at 168 miles per hour.

Charlene was torn from the airplane and killed instantly. Kimberly, Kenneth, and Randal were unconscious with head injuries. James incurred rib fractures, wounds to his head and face, and a zygomatic fracture. Christopher had a fracture to the right forearm and a severe laceration to the right hand. The two of them were able to evacuate the unconscious children from the aircraft and after eight hours in sub-freezing conditions, James found a nearby road and flagged down a car. They were taken to a hospital a few miles south of the crash site in Hebron, Nebraska.

The hospital was not open at that hour and it took some time to gather personnel. Once it was open, Styner found that the hospital staff had little training in the management of serious trauma. He was particularly concerned about the lack of protection for the injured children's cervical spines. He called his partner Bruce Miller, who arranged for their evacuation by helicopter to Lincoln General Hospital.

== Advanced Trauma Life Support course ==
Styner's concern with the lack of a uniform system for treating trauma stuck with him. He said later, "When I can provide better care in the field with limited resources than my children and I received at the primary facility, there is something wrong with the system, and the system has to be changed." or "If you don't train them, you can't blame them," as he sometimes quipped. In 1978, he collaborated with several colleagues and the Lincoln Medical Education Foundation to offer the prototype Advanced Trauma Life Support course in Auburn, Nebraska.

In 1980, the American College of Surgeons Committee on Trauma adopted ATLS for domestic and international audiences. Styner himself recertified as an ATLS instructor in 2007, teaching his instructor candidate course in Nottingham, England and the Netherlands. On March 22, 2013, the American College of Surgeons Committee on Trauma renamed their annual Award for Meritorious Service in ATLS to the James K. Styner Award for Meritorious Service. Styner died on January 22, 2024, at the age of 89.
