= Inspector Sands =

Code phrase for fire

Announcement used at Euston railway station

"Inspector Sands" is a code phrase used by public transport authorities in the United Kingdom, including Network Rail and London Underground, to alert staff to a fire alarm without needing to evacuate the station. The exact wording depends on the station and the nature of the incident. For example: "Would Inspector Sands please report to the operations room immediately." or "Would Inspector Sands please report to Platform 2."

The automated public address announcement can be generated automatically by the station's fire warning system, or can be triggered from the station control. The message audio file is usually stored as the primary standard emergency announcement on the station PA/VA system. Fire alarms in small buildings automatically activate all fire sounders to instruct occupants to evacuate the building whereas larger public buildings such as railway stations require a staged evacuation procedure to avoid false alarms. The message may indicate that a single fire alarm call point in a public area has been activated and which needs to be corroborated by a station staff member before a decision is made whether to evacuate the whole station.

If an automatic fire detector in a non-public area is operated, or more than one device or zone reports a fire, the system will start the evacuation procedure and the fire brigade is automatically called. The announcement can be triggered by the station controller to alert station staff of other incidents which need urgent attention. The automated nature of the announcement and its high priority means that it has occasionally been known to cut into manual (lower priority) announcements being made by station staff. On some railway stations the announcement is also triggered during the routine testing of alarm systems.

== History ==
The code phrase "Mr Sands" was used in theatres during the late 19th and early 20th centuries to let the staff know that there was a fire backstage, without alarming the audience. In the confined space of theatre, a panicked crowd attempting to leave quickly could trample or crush each other. As sand buckets were sometimes used to extinguish fires, the code word Mr Sands was used.

== See also ==
- Hospital emergency codes § "Doctor" codes
