= Society of Critical Care Medicine =

The Society of Critical Care Medicine (SCCM) is the largest non-profit medical organization in the practice of critical care. SCCM was established in 1970 and is an independently incorporated, international, educational and scientific society based in the United States. Its members are multi-professional health professionals providing care to critically ill and injured patients, and SCCM is the only organization that represents all professional components of the critical care team. The Society supports research and education, and advocates on issues related to critical care.

== History ==
The SCCM was established in 1970 at meeting of 29 physicians in Los Angeles, California. Dr. Max Harry Weil, often credited with founding the specialty of critical care medicine, was the first president of the Society. In 1972, Peter Safar became the second president of Society of Critical Care Medicine. Safar is credited with pioneering CPR.

The American College of Critical Care Medicine (ACCM) was created within SCCM in 1988. Fellows of the American College of Critical Care Medicine (FCCM) are practitioners, researchers, administrators, and educators who have made outstanding contributions to the collaborative field of critical care. The Master of Critical Care Medicine (MCCM) designation honors members who have distinguished themselves by achieving national and international professional prominence due to personal character, leadership, eminence in clinical practice, outstanding contributions to research and education in critical care medicine, or years of exemplary service to SCCM, ACCM, and the field of critical care medicine in its broadest sense.

== Conferences ==
The Society holds its annual international conference in January or February. The Society also holds other conferences, symposia, courses and meetings throughout the year.

== Patient information ==
SCCM provides free educational material for patients and families in the intensive care unit (ICU) from the SCCM patient and family resource center, including the patient communicator app and information on post-intensive care syndrome.

== Publications ==
The Society has three official journals, Critical Care Medicine, Pediatric Critical Care Medicine (PCCM) and Critical Care Explorations, a peer-reviewed open access monthly medical journal. The editor-in-chief is Timothy G. Buchman. The SCCM also publishes a quarterly newsletter, Critical Connections. It is the official publication of the Society of Critical Care Medicine and is published by Lippincott Williams & Wilkins.

The Society of Critical Care Medicine produces a podcast for critical care clinicians, The iCritical Care Podcast.

The Society has participated in developing guidelines and policies with:

- Canadian Journal of Anesthesia
- American Academy of Pediatrics
- National Guideline Clearinghouse – AHRQ
- Health Resources and Services Administration: Report to Congress – HRSA
