= Code word (figure of speech) =

Word or phrase with a special meaning

A code word is a word or a phrase designed to convey a predetermined meaning to an audience who know the phrase, while remaining inconspicuous to the uninitiated. For example, a public address system may be used to make an announcement asking for "Inspector Sands" to attend a particular area, which staff will recognise as a code word for a fire or bomb threat, and the general public will ignore.

== Medical use ==
- A doctor may refer to a suspected case of tuberculosis as "Koch's disease" in order to avoid alarming patients.
- Some medical nicknames are derogatory, such as GOMER for "Get Out of My Emergency Room".
- Emergency rescue workers or police officers may say, "There is a 'K'," to mean a dead body. Valtteri Suomalainen reported eksi (from Latin: exitus lethalis), in use in hospitals in Finland.
- Code Pink in some hospitals can mean a missing baby, and the initiation of an all-staff response.
- The euphemisms "Rose Cottage" and "Rainbow's End" are sometimes used in British hospitals to enable discussion of death in front of patients, the latter mainly for children. A similar phrase used is: "transferred to ward 13", as hospitals in the UK routinely do not have such a ward.
- American hospitals may make an announcement regarding a "Mr. [or Dr.] Strong", as code to alert orderlies that a patient or visitor at a stated location is in need of physical restraint.

== Military and espionage use ==
Code names are used for military and espionage purposes as labels for people, locations, objects, projects and plans the details of which are intended to remain secret to the uninitiated.

For example, the code name of "Mogul" is used by the United States Secret Service to refer to the President of the United States Donald Trump.

The United States Navy mistook the code word "Friend of Dorothy," meaning an LGBT individual, as meaning literally a person who was a friend of someone by the name of "Dorothy," and investigated on that basis.

== Other usages ==
- In the United Kingdom, Inspector Sands is a code word to alert staff of an emergency situation such as a fire or an attack, without causing a mass panic. This code word was used in the Manchester Arena bombing and is used in the majority of British transport locations. The code word is usually used in the context: "Would Inspector Sands please report to the operations room immediately."
- Some stores have special codes that allow one employee to inform another that a certain customer in the store needs to be watched because they are acting in a suspicious manner similar to the typical behavior of a shoplifter.
- Movie theater employees may say, "Mr. Johnson is in theater number three" to indicate that there is a fire or smoke in that theater. Nightclubs and bars often use the name "Mr. Sands".
- Many taxi drivers use radio codes like, "There's an oil spill at ...", or "Cardboard boxes lying on the road ...", to warn other drivers of a police speed detection unit. There are other codes to tell other drivers that a popular taxi rank is empty (or full), or warn of drunk or obnoxious customers trying to hail a taxi. "There's a number eight at the railway station," might mean beware of a fare who looks likely to throw up in your taxi.
- Schools will sometimes use codes during intercom announcements for situations that might distract students (such as an early dismissal due to weather).
- The Drug Enforcement Administration reported in July 2018 a total of 353 different code words used for cannabis. Code words are used extensively within the illegal drug trade to hide drug trafficking activities from the uninitiated.
- Some "code words" are fictitious. In the Sherlock TV series, "Vatican cameos" is used between John Watson and Sherlock Holmes as a code word, initially meaning simply 'duck' or 'get ready.' Various internet sources offer an erroneous etymology for the phrase, suggesting it dates to World War II. It is, in fact, an allusion to an unpublished case investigated by Holmes in the canonical short story "The Hound of the Baskervilles".

== Informal code words and propaganda ==
An informal code word is a term used without formal or prior agreement to communicate to a subset of listeners or readers predisposed to see its double meaning.

Informal code words can find use in propaganda, distinct from use of euphemistic code words to delay or avoid emotional responses in the audience. They may be intended to be construed as generalized platitudes by the majority of listeners, but as quite specific promises by those for whom the specific wording was crafted.

== See also ==
- Cant (language)
- Code name
- Dog-whistle politics
- Doublespeak
- Euphemism
- Framing (social sciences)
- Glittering generality
- Loaded language
- Obfuscation
- Political correctness
- Virtue word
- Shibboleth
