= Graham patch =

- Specialty: Gastroenterology

A Graham patch is a surgical technique that is used to close duodenal perforations. A piece of omentum is used to cover the perforation. This patch is typically used for holes with a size of 5mm or less.

== Procedure ==
An appropriately-sized tongue of tension-free, well-vascularized omentum is used to plug the perforation. The omental patch is held in place by interrupted sutures placed through healthy duodenum on either side of the perforation. Once the patch is secure, the seal can be tested by submerging the site under irrigation fluid and injecting air into the patient's nasogastric tube. The absence of air bubbles indicates that the seal is intact.

== See also ==
- Peptic ulcer disease
- Duodenal ulcer
- Gastrointestinal perforation
- Laparotomy
