= EBioMedicine =

eBioMedicine
- Discipline: Medicine
- Language: English

Publication details
- History: 2014-present
- Publisher: Elsevier
- Frequency: Continuous
- Open access: Yes
- Impact factor: 9.7 (2023)

Standard abbreviations
- ISO 4: eBioMedicine

Indexing
- ISSN: 2352-3964

Links
- Journal homepage

eBioMedicine is a peer-reviewed open access medical journal initially launched by Elsevier, shortly thereafter supported by Cell Press and The Lancet, and in 2018 incorporated in The Lancet Group journals, at the occasion of the inception of its sister journal eClinicalMedicine (Impact Factor 9.6), also published by The Lancet. In January 2022, eBioMedicine and eClinicalMedicine became parts of THE LANCET Discovery Science, a suite of open access journals dedicated to essential early evidence.

The journal is abstracted and indexed in Index Medicus, MEDLINE, and PubMed.
