= Emergency Nurses Association =

Nursing organization

- Formation: 1970
- Founder: Anita Dorr; Judith Kelleher
- Headquarters: Schaumburg, Illinois
- Members: 50,000 (2021)
- Website: www.ena.org

The Emergency Nurses Association (ENA) is an international professional organization representing emergency nursing. Consisting of nearly 50,000 members, ENA addresses issues relevant to emergency care, publishes professional guidelines, provides education for emergency nurses and issues a peer-reviewed journal. As part of its ENA University, ENA offers education specific to emergency nurses.

== The organization ==
Established in 1970 as the Emergency Department Nurses Association, the organization resulted from the merger of two organizations. One of the organizations, also known as the Emergency Department Nurses Association, had been founded by Judith Kelleher on the West Coast; the other, the Emergency Room Nurses Organization, was established by Anita Dorr in the Eastern United States. ENA took its current name in 1985, emphasizing the role of emergency nurses over the practice setting of the emergency department. As of 2021, ENA has over 50,000 members in 35 nations.

ENA has collected survey data on emergency nursing, including a 2006 member survey which indicated high job satisfaction in the specialty but pointed to concern among emergency nurses about workplace violence and safety. ENA has partnered with the Institute of Medicine to address issues related to emergency care reform. The organization also publishes public safety and injury prevention information, including its National Scorecard on State Roadway Laws, which looks at each state's use of items such as child safety seats, seatbelts, ignition lock devices and graduated driver licensing.

The association has published emergency guidelines, including Guidelines for Care of Children in the Emergency Department, which was written in conjunction with the American College of Emergency Physicians and the American Academy of Pediatrics. ENA publishes a bimonthly, peer-reviewed journal, Journal of Emergency Nursing. In the 1970s, the group helped to found the Board of Certification in Emergency Nursing, which sponsors the Certified Emergency Nurse (CEN) examination.
