= Social emergency medicine =

Social emergency medicine is an emerging branch of emergency medicine that explores the interplay of social forces and the emergency care system, and how these act together to affect the health of individuals and their communities. Organized in 2009, the field has gained wider acceptance within the larger specialty of emergency medicine. Initiatives in social emergency medicine include research, direct service and advocacy aimed at addressing the social determinants of health.

== Scope ==
Social emergency medicine encompasses many environmental and behavioral factors that affect health. These include housing and food insecurity, the use and misuse of tobacco, drugs, and alcohol, community and interpersonal violence, the impact of firearms on public health, human trafficking, and communicable disease including HIV and Hepatitis C. Proponents of social emergency medicine support research to better understand the origins and impact of these factors on the health of individuals and communities, and work to create screening tools and interventions to address the issues that lead to health disparities in the population. Though there is significant overlap with the fields of social work and public health, social emergency medicine endeavors to leverage the unique position of the Emergency Department in the community to add new perspectives and information to the local and national discussions regarding our approach to addressing health disparities.

== History ==
The term "social emergency medicine" traces its origins to 2009, when emergency physicians, Dr. Harrison Alter and Dr. Barry Simon, at Highland Hospital in Oakland, California, formed the Andrew Levitt Center for Social Emergency Medicine, an independent non-profit research and advocacy institute. In 2017 the American College of Emergency Physicians approved the creation of a social emergency medicine section, and in the same year the Society for Academic Emergency Medicine authorized the Social Emergency Medicine and Population Health Interest Group. In September 2017 a consensus conference was held in Dallas, Texas in order to further refine the definition, scope, and aims of this burgeoning field. In 2020, the American Academy of Emergency Medicine (AAEM) approved the creation of a social emergency medicine section, as well.

== Training ==
Despite the significant impact of social and behavioral factors on health, these topics are only recently beginning to receive significant attention in undergraduate medical education curricula in the United States. Similarly, emergency medicine residencies devote differing amounts of resources to teaching these topics. Most residencies provide at least introductory teaching on the social determinants of health, as advocacy around health disparities is named as a key subset of the professionalism competency in the 2016 American Board of Emergency Medicine Model of Clinical Practice. Some residencies provide an opportunity for interested trainees to dedicate more time to social emergency medicine topics through tracks or concentration areas. As of 2018, these include NYU, the University of Illinois at Chicago, Johns Hopkins, and Stanford.

Fellowships in social emergency medicine can be found at The University of California, Los Angeles, Stanford University, and St Barnabas Hospital (Bronx). A fellowship in Population Health, which focuses on closely related content, is offered by New York University and research programs can be found at the Wisconsin Population Health Service and the Andrew Levitt Center for Social Emergency Medicine.

== Screening and interventions ==
Screening in the Emergency Department must be brief and/or targeted in order to be appropriate for an acute care setting. Notable examples of social emergency medicine screening and interventions include:

- Asking patients about safety at home and in their relationships, and helping them develop safety plans if they are experiencing abuse
- Engaging with victims of gun violence to try to help break the cycle of violence in their community
- Performing screening, brief intervention and referral to treatment (SBIRT) for patients struggling with substance use
- Offering HIV and Hep C screening tests to all patients, or to patients with certain risk factors
- Providing ED-based advocates to help connect patients with further resources in the community
