= Trauma team =

Team of healthcare workers treating severe injury

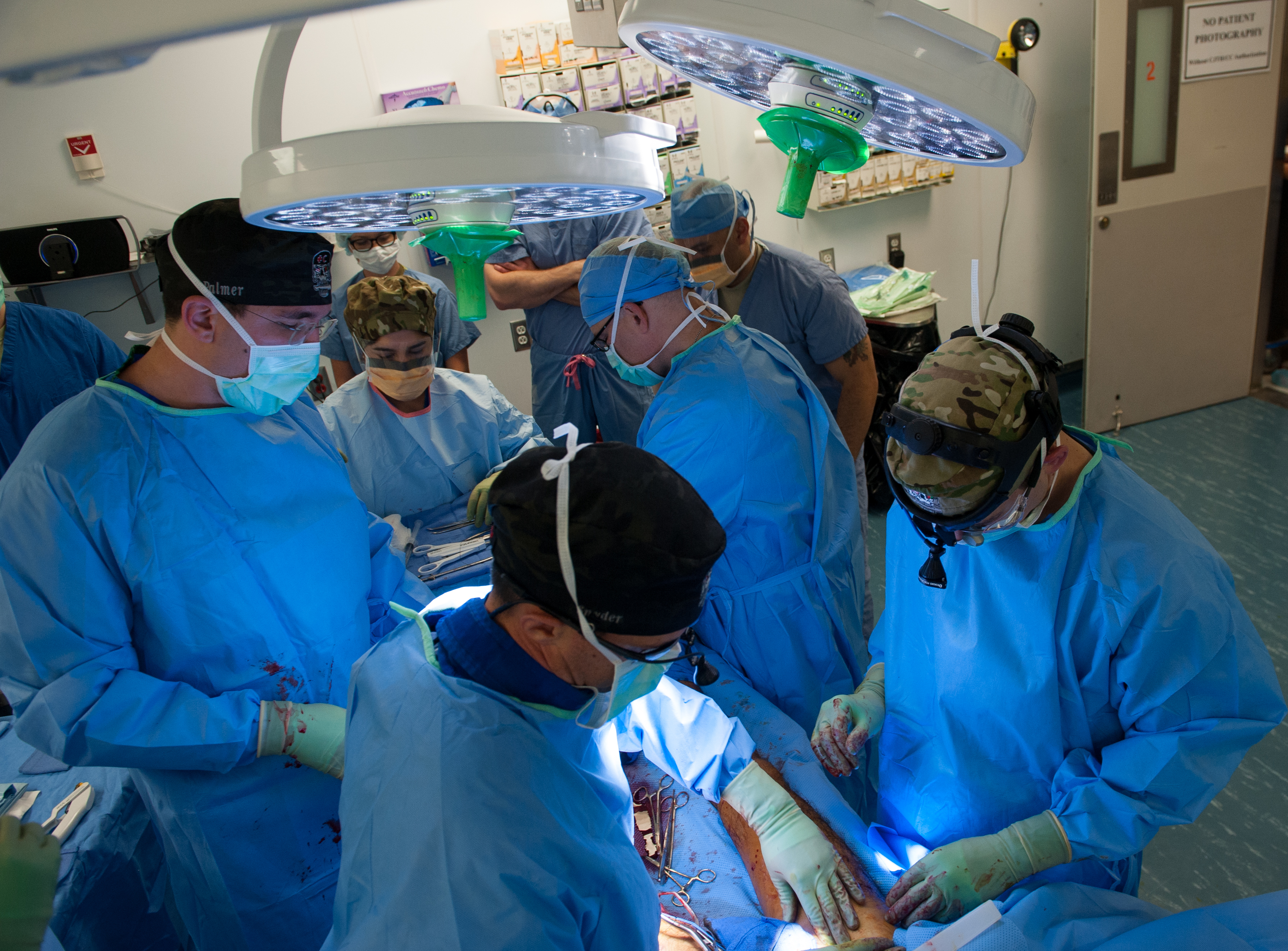
The trauma team works together to diagnose and treat the severely injured.

A trauma team is a multidisciplinary group of healthcare workers under the direction of a team leader that works together to assess and treat the severely injured. This team typically meets before the patient reaches the trauma center. Upon arrival, the team does an initial assessment and necessary resuscitation, adhering to a defined protocol.

== Team members ==
Trauma teams can consist of the following:

- Team leader: The team leader is usually an experienced physician or trauma surgeon. The team leader makes all diagnostic and therapeutic decisions regarding the patient. They are responsible for determining the disease, condition, or complication the patient has, and how to treat it. They are in charge of the medical record, are in direct communication with the operating room and radiology, and direct other team members to complete specific tasks. The team leader stands at the foot of the patient and oversees all activities.
- Primary physician: The primary physician performs the primary and secondary surveys. A primary survey is a quick assessment and treatment for life-threatening injuries. The usual causes of death after a traumatic injury are airway obstruction, respiratory insufficiencies, shock, and central nervous system injuries. In a primary trauma survey, the physician looks at the airway and cervical spine, breathing, circulation, neurological deficit, and exposure and environment at time of injury. The secondary trauma survey detects other significant, but not life-threatening conditions. If a patient is determined to be stable, a head-to-toe assessment will be performed by the physician after completion of primary survey. If the patient is unstable, a secondary survey will not be performed and the patient should be transported directly to the operating room or to a trauma center. A secondary exam is broadly composed of taking the patient's history and performing a physical examination. A patient’s history can help to understand the extent of the injury. Information like what the patient is allergic to, medications he or she might be on, past medical history (injuries, vaccinations, etc.), what they ate for their last meal, and the events leading up to the injury can help physicians better diagnose and treat the patient. The physical exam includes examining the patient's head and face, cervical spine, thoracic cavity, abdomen, pelvis, lower genitourinary, back and extremities. The primary physician calls out physical findings for the scribe to hear so the scribe can record all steps taken to care for the patient.

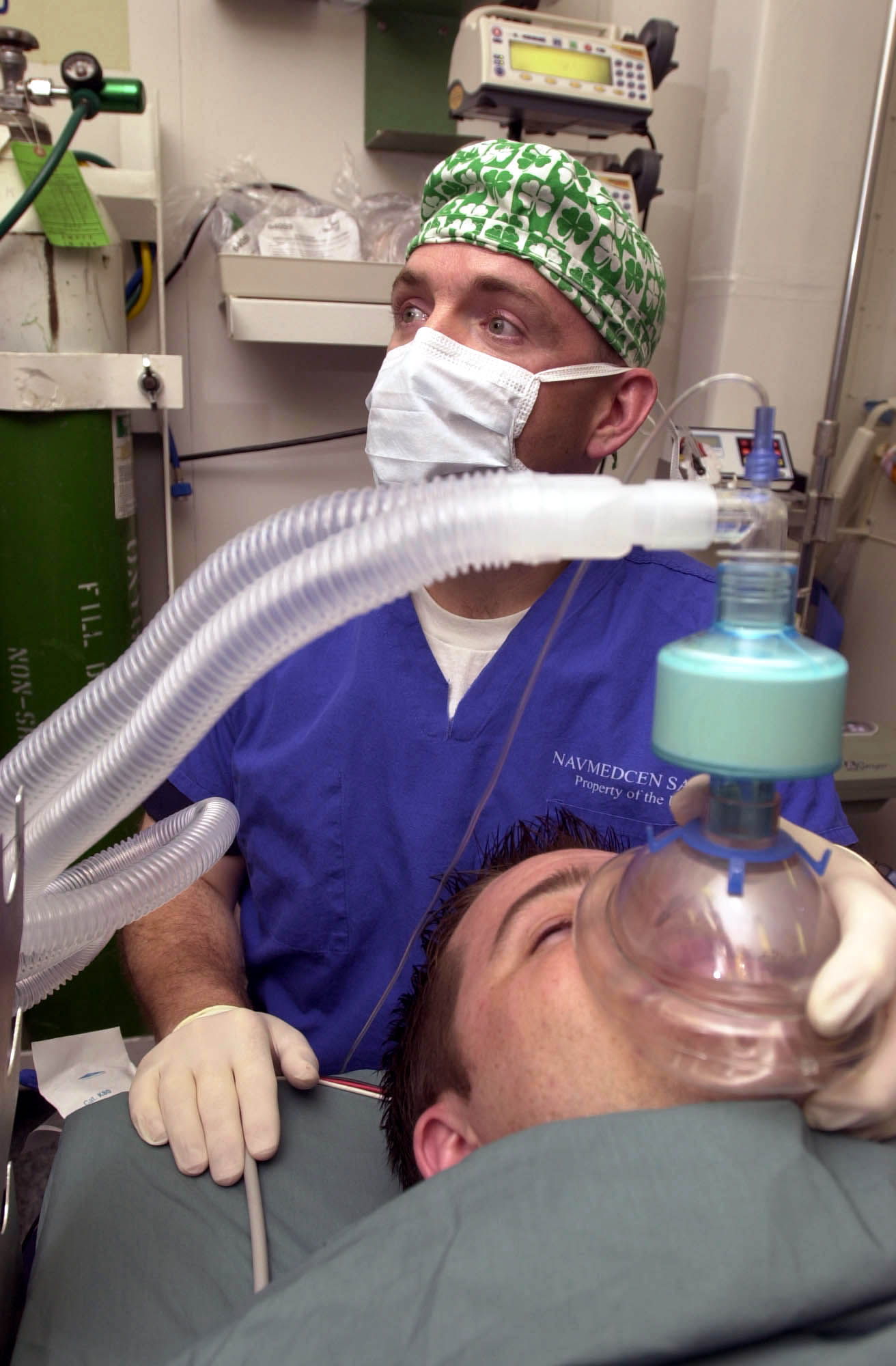
Anesthesiologists play a role in the airway team.

- Airway team: The airway team consists of one to two practitioners. Their main concern is maintaining the patient's airway. Emergency medicine physicians, anesthesiologists, respiratory therapists, critical care surgeons, and CRNAs (certified registered nurse anesthetist) can be on the airway team. In addition to maintaining the patient's airway, they intubate the patient as necessary. The airway team is responsible for communicating with the patient and answering questions if needed.

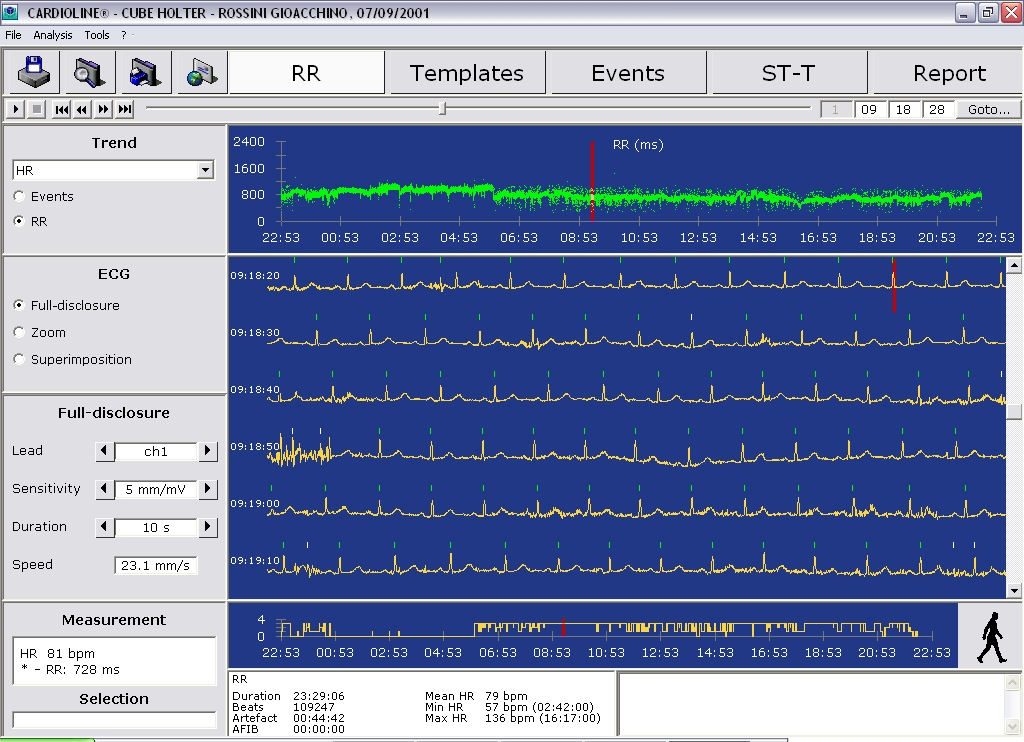
Trauma Nurses support the trauma team by use of an ECG.

- Trauma nurse - One to two nurses stand on either side of the patient. The trauma nurses are in charge of ECG (electrocardiogram- measures electrical activity of the heart), oximetry (measure oxygen levels), blood pressure, IV access (ability to obtain access to peripheral veins to obtain blood or administer medications), clothing removal, hanging fluids, blood draws and medications.
- Radiographer: The radiographer is usually an x-ray or CT (computed tomography) technologist. The radiographer is in charge of removing jewelry from the patient, positioning the patient and making sure all practitioners are protected from radiation.
- Social worker or chaplain: The social worker or chaplain is the primary person to communicate with the patient’s family. The social worker or chaplain identifies the patient, contacts the family, greets the family, and provides communication and/or spiritual guidance and support.
- Recorder/scribe: The recorder/scribe is usually a nurse who is in charge of recording all the resuscitation steps, vital signs, and overall flow of who performed which procedures in the medical record.
- Medical student: Medical students are under the direction and supervision of the senior resident (usually). Their role on the trauma team varies depending on the hospital protocols. With supervision, medical students may do laceration repairs, insert IVs, insert Foley catheters, draw blood for the arterial blood gas test, conduct incision and draining, do splinting, or perform bedside ultrasound. The student may have a specific position in relation to the patient and other team members, which varies depending on the hospital.

Other specialties can be added depending on the nature of the injury. For example a neurosurgeon will attend if there is a serious head injury; However, added members should not draw away from the functioning and responsibilities of the core team. Many hospitals will have neurosurgeons, orthopedic surgeons, plastic surgeons, cardiothoracic surgeons, and physicians from other specialties on standby. All staff should be trained in Advanced Trauma Life Support techniques. Each hospital will have a list of criteria that require the activation of the trauma team, such as a fall of over 6 meters or a fracture of 2 or more bones.

== Trauma team activation ==
There is no single universal list that dictates trauma team activation across different facilities. Each individual trauma center should generate its own criteria that are specifically designed for the location, available resources, and the patients. These criteria should also be easy to understand and readily available to the necessary individuals. Trauma team activation should be closely monitored and evaluated constantly to adapt to the changing healthcare field and regulations.

Hospitals should clearly define when the team must be assembled, who is to respond, and how they will be notified. Most trauma centers have multiple tiers, meaning not every member of a trauma team needs to respond to every emergency.

== Trauma team assessment ==
Trauma teams are important to reduce mortality of patients. Its multi-faceted approach incorporates a variety of medical fields both in the hospital and out of the hospital in the form of Emergency Medical Services. Trauma teams reduce the time between the emergency department arrival and other necessary steps to treat patents such as CT scans and operating rooms. Patients who have traumatic injuries but are not treated by the trauma team have increased mortality.

Trauma teams are assessed in multiple ways: by video, simulators, and third party observers. All three are used to identify errors and improve care. Video is one of the most efficient methods of review because trauma team members can see the errors being done in real time. Some common errors noted from video review are failure of team coordination, poor communication, and failure to do certain tasks. One downfall of video review is its inability to review vital signs without a specific vital sign monitor recording. Confidentiality can also be an issue with video review because patient consent is difficult to obtain.

Simulators can be an effective learning tool as well. A benefit of using simulators is the ability to stop mid procedure. Doing so offers the team an opportunity to pause while no lives are at stake, providing a learning environment that feels safer and more open. The simulator itself can be a downfall as it may be difficult to use.

Observation by third party is effective when assessing one team member, but can be less effective if one observer is expected to monitor all members. It may also yield biased data.

== See also ==
- Traumatology
- Emergency Department
- Trauma Center
- Emergency Medical Services

== Bibliography ==
- Feliciano, David V.; Mattox, Kenneth L.; Moore, Ernest J (2013). Trauma, Seventh Edition (Trauma (Moore)). McGraw-Hill Professional. ISBN 978-0-07-166351-9.
