= Journal of Emergency Nursing =

- Discipline: Emergency nursing
- Language: English
- Edited by: Jessica Castner

Publication details
- History: 1983–present
- Publisher: Elsevier on behalf of the Emergency Nurses Association
- Frequency: 6/year
- Impact factor: 1.489 (2018)

Standard abbreviations
- ISO 4: J. Emerg. Nurs.

Indexing
- ISSN: 0099-1767
- OCLC no.: 2243381

Links
- Journal homepage; Online access; Journal page at publisher's website

The Journal of Emergency Nursing is the official peer-reviewed journal of the Emergency Nurses Association, covering emergency nursing. It's published on behalf of the association by Elsevier and was established in 1983. The journal is abstracted and indexed in CINAHL, Science Citation Index Expanded, and Scopus. According to the Journal Citation Reports, the journal has a 2013 impact factor of 1.131.
