= The Lancet Group =

Medical journal family

The Lancet Group is a journal family related to the medical journal The Lancet. They are divided into three main categories of journals, speciality journals, regional journals, and discovery science journals.

== Journals ==
=== Speciality journals ===
Journals marked with (OA) are open access, those marked with (H) are hybrid access journals

- The Lancet (H)
- The Lancet Child & Adolescent Health (H)
- The Lancet Diabetes & Endocrinology (H)
- The Lancet Digital Health (OA)
- The Lancet Gastroenterology & Hepatology (H)
- The Lancet Global Health (OA)
- The Lancet HIV (H)
- The Lancet Haematology (H)
- The Lancet Healthy Longevity (OA)
- The Lancet Infectious Diseases (H)
- The Lancet Medical Imaging & Theranostics (OA)
- The Lancet Microbe (OA)
- The Lancet Neurology (H)
- The Lancet Obstetrics, Gynaecology, & Women's Health (H)
- The Lancet Oncology (H)
- The Lancet Planetary Health (OA)
- The Lancet Primary Care (OA)
- The Lancet Psychiatry (H)
- The Lancet Public Health (OA)
- The Lancet Respiratory Medicine (H)
- The Lancet Rheumatology (H)
- The Lancet Surgery & Anaesthesiology (H)

=== Regional journals ===
All journals are open access

- The Lancet Regional Health - Africa
- The Lancet Regional Health - Americas
- The Lancet Regional Health - Eastern Mediterranean
- The Lancet Regional Health - Europe
- The Lancet Regional Health - Southeast Asia
- The Lancet Regional Health - Western Pacific

=== Discovery Science journals ===
All are open access journals

- eBioMedicine
- eClinicalMedicine

== Blog ==
From 2007 to 2015, a blog called The Lancet Student was run.
