= Trauma (journal) =

- Discipline: Emergency medicine
- Language: English
- Edited by: Ian Greaves, Keith M Porter

Publication details
- History: 1999-present
- Publisher: SAGE Publications
- Frequency: Quarterly
- Impact factor: (2010)

Standard abbreviations
- ISO 4: Trauma

Indexing
- ISSN: 1460-4086 (print); 1477-0350 (web)
- OCLC no.: 300861527

Links
- Journal homepage; Online access; Online archive

Trauma is a quarterly peer-reviewed medical journal that covers research in the field of emergency medicine. Its editors-in-chief are Ian Greaves (James Cook University Hospital) and Keith M Porter (Selly Oak Hospital). It was established in 1999 and is currently published by SAGE Publications in association with TraumaCare.

== Abstracting and indexing ==
Trauma is abstracted and indexed in Academic Search Premier, EMBASE, and SCOPUS.
