= List of emergency medicine courses =

This list of emergency medicine courses contains programs often required to be taken by emergency medical providers, including emergency medical technicians, paramedics, and emergency physicians.

== Prehospital ==
- Prehospital Emergency Care Course (PhEC)
- Prehospital Trauma Life Support (PHTLS)

== Medicine ==
- Advanced Cardiac Life Support (ACLS)
- Advanced Medical Life Support (AMLS)
- FP-C (Flight Paramedic)
- Hospital and Emergency Procedures CME courses

== Pediatrics and obstetrics ==
- Advanced Life Support in Obstetrics (ALSO)
- Emergency Pediatric Care (EPC)
- Neonatal Resuscitation Program (NRP)
- Pediatric Advanced Life Support (PALS)
- Pediatric Education for Prehospital Professionals (PEPP)
- Emergency Nursing Pediatric Course (ENPC)

== Trauma ==
- Advanced Trauma Life Support (ATLS)
- Anaesthesia Trauma and Critical Care (ATACC)
- International Trauma Life Support (ITLS) (formerly Basic Trauma Life Support)
- European Trauma Course (ETC)
- Trauma Nursing Core Course (TNCC)
- Battlefield Advanced Trauma Life Support (BATLS)

== Ambulance operations ==
- Coaching the Emergency Vehicle Operator (CEVO)
- Emergency Vehicle Operations Course (EVOC)

== HazMat ==
- Basic Hazmat Life Support (BHLS)
- Advanced Hazmat Life Support (AHLS)

== See also ==
- Emergency medical services
- Emergency medicine
