= Annals of Intensive Care =

- Discipline: Intensive care
- Language: English
- Edited by: Jean-Louis Teboul

Publication details
- History: 2011-present
- Publisher: Springer Science+Business Media on behalf of the French Intensive Care Society (France)
- Frequency: Monthly
- Open access: Yes
- License: CC BY 4.0
- Impact factor: 6.925 (2020)

Standard abbreviations
- ISO 4: Ann. Intensive Care

Indexing
- CODEN: AICNC7
- ISSN: 2110-5820
- OCLC no.: 727063282

Links
- Journal homepage; Online access; Online archive

The Annals of Intensive Care is a monthly open access peer-reviewed medical journal covering intensive care medicine. It was established in 2011. The editor-in-chief is Jean-Louis Teboul. It is the official journal of the French Intensive Care Society and is published by Springer Science+Business Media.

== Abstracting and indexing ==
The journal is abstracted and indexed in:

- Chemical Abstracts
- Current Contents/Clinical Medicine
- Embase
- Science Citation Index Expanded
- Scopus
