= Advanced trauma life support =

American medical training program

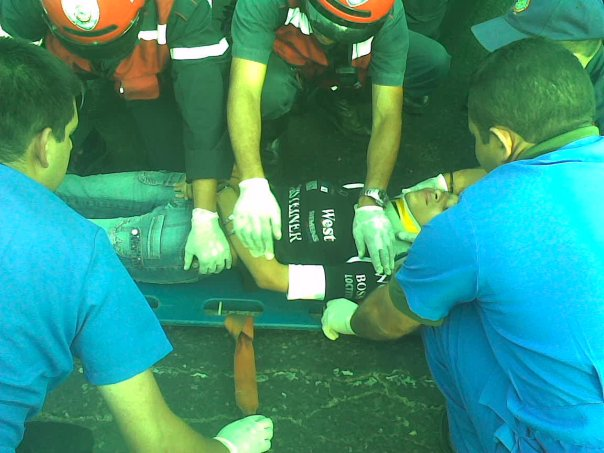

General information
- Names: Advanced trauma life support
- Abbreviation: ATLS
- Field: Medicine

History
- Inventor: James K. Styner, Paul 'Skip' Collicott
- Invention date: 1978

Description
- Organizer: American College of Surgeons
- Participants: emergency physicians, paramedics and other advanced practitioners
- Duration: 3 days (for hybrid course)
- Frequency: 1 week – 1 month

Additionally
- Related courses: Advanced cardiac life support Pediatric advanced life support Fundamental critical care support

Advanced trauma life support (ATLS) is a training program for doctors in the management of acute trauma cases, developed by the American College of Surgeons. Similar programs exist for immediate care providers such as paramedics. The program has been taught worldwide to over 1 million doctors in over 80 countries, sometimes under the name of Early Management of Severe Trauma, especially outside North America. Its goal is to teach a simplified and standardized approach to trauma patients. Originally designed for emergency situations where only one doctor and one nurse are present, ATLS is now widely accepted as the standard of care for initial assessment and treatment in trauma centers. The premise of the ATLS program is to treat the greatest threat to life first. It also advocates that the lack of a definitive diagnosis and a detailed history should not slow the application of indicated treatment for life-threatening injury, with the most time-critical interventions performed early. However, to date, there is no high-quality evidence to show that ATLS improves patient outcomes, but at least one large-scale trial is ongoing.

== Primary survey ==
The first and key part of the assessment of patients presenting with trauma is called the primary survey. During this time, life-threatening injuries are identified and simultaneously resuscitation is begun. A simple mnemonic, ABCDE, is used as a mnemonic for the order in which problems should be addressed.

=== Airway maintenance ===
Cervical spine stabilization is the first step, after that follow ABCD. The first stage of the primary survey is to assess the airway. If the patient is able to talk, the airway is likely to be clear. If the patient is unconscious, he/she may not be able to maintain his/her own airway. The airway can be opened using a chin lift or jaw thrust. Airway adjuncts may be required. If the airway is blocked (e.g., by blood or vomit), the fluid must be cleaned out of the patient's mouth by the help of suctioning instruments. In the case of obstruction, pass an endotracheal tube.

=== Breathing and ventilation ===
The chest must be examined by inspection, palpation, percussion, and auscultation. Subcutaneous emphysema and tracheal deviation must be identified if present. The aim is to identify and manage six life-threatening thoracic conditions as airway obstruction, tension pneumothorax, massive haemothorax, open pneumothorax, flail chest segment with pulmonary contusion, and cardiac tamponade. Flail chest, tracheal deviation, penetrating injuries and bruising can be recognized by inspection. Subcutaneous emphysema can be recognized by palpation. Tension pneumothorax and haemothorax can be recognized by percussion and auscultation.

=== Circulation with bleeding control ===
Hemorrhage is the predominant cause of preventable post-injury deaths. Hypovolemic shock is caused by significant blood loss. Two large-bore intravenous lines are established and crystalloid solution may be given. If the person does not respond to this, type-specific blood, or O-negative if this is not available, should be given. External bleeding is controlled by direct pressure. Occult blood loss may be into the chest, abdomen, pelvis or from the long bones.

=== Disability/Neurologic assessment ===
During the primary survey a basic neurological assessment is made, known by the mnemonic AVPU (alert, verbal stimuli response, painful stimuli response, or unresponsive). A more detailed and rapid neurological evaluation is performed at the end of the primary survey. This establishes the patient's level of consciousness, pupil size and reaction, lateralizing signs, and spinal cord injury level.

The Glasgow Coma Scale is a quick method to determine the level of consciousness, and is predictive of patient outcome. If not done in the primary survey, it should be performed as part of the more detailed neurologic examination in the secondary survey. An altered level of consciousness indicates the need for immediate reevaluation of the patient's oxygenation, ventilation, and perfusion status. Hypoglycemia and drugs, including alcohol, may influence the level of consciousness. If these are excluded, changes in the level of consciousness should be considered to be due to traumatic brain injury until proven otherwise.

=== Exposure and environmental control ===
The patient should be completely undressed, usually by cutting off the garments. It is imperative to cover the patient with warm blankets to prevent hypothermia in the emergency department. Intravenous fluids should be warmed and a warm environment maintained. Patient privacy should be maintained.

== Secondary survey ==
When the primary survey is completed, resuscitation efforts are well established, and the vital signs are normalizing, the secondary survey can begin. The secondary survey is a head-to-toe evaluation of the trauma patient, including a complete history and physical examination, including the reassessment of all vital signs. Each region of the body must be fully examined. X-rays indicated by examination are obtained. If at any time during the secondary survey the patient deteriorates, another primary survey is carried out as a potential life threat may be present. The person should be removed from the hard spine board and placed on a firm mattress as soon as reasonably feasible as the spine board can rapidly cause skin breakdown and pain while a firm mattress provides equivalent stability for potential spinal fractures.

== Tertiary survey ==
A careful and complete examination followed by serial assessments help recognize missed injuries and related problems, allowing a definitive care management. The rate of delayed diagnosis may be as high as 10%.

== Alternatives ==
Mannequin surgical simulators are widely used in the United States as alternatives to the use of live animals in ATLS courses. In 2014, PETA announced that it was donating surgical simulators to ATLS training centers in 9 countries that agreed to switch from animal use to training on the simulators.

Additionally, Anaesthesia Trauma and Critical Care (ATACC) is an international trauma course based in the United Kingdom that teaches an advanced trauma course and represents the next level for trauma care and trauma patient management post ATLS certification. Accredited by two Royal Colleges and numerous emergency services, the course runs numerous times per year for candidates drawn from all areas of medicine and trauma care. Specific injuries, such as major burn injury, may be better managed by other programs.

In military medicine, the ATLS protocol has been modified to the Battlefield Advanced Trauma Life Support (BATLS) protocol. The treatment procedure is cABCDE. Added c = Catastrophic bleeding (massive external bleeding).

== History ==
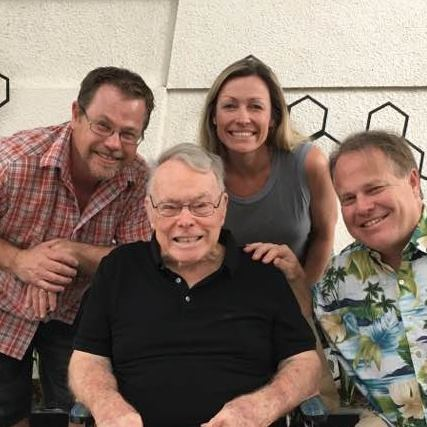
James Styner with three of his children who all received severe head trauma in the crash

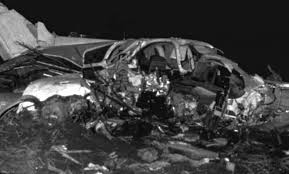
Styner's Beechcraft Baron after the crash

ATLS has its origins in the United States in 1976, when James K. Styner, an orthopedic surgeon piloting a light aircraft, crashed his plane into a field in Nebraska. His wife Charlene was killed instantly and three of his four children, Ken, Randy, and Kim sustained critical injuries. His son Chris suffered a broken arm. He carried out the initial triage of his children at the crash site. Styner had to flag down a car to transport him to the nearest hospital in Hebron; upon arrival, he found it closed. Even once the hospital was opened and a doctor called in, he found that the emergency care provided at the small regional hospital where they were treated was inadequate and inappropriate. Upon returning to Lincoln, Styner declared: "When I can provide better care in the field with limited resources than what my children and I received at the primary care facility, there is something wrong with the system and the system has to be changed."

Upon returning to work, he set about developing a system for saving lives in medical trauma situations. Styner and his colleague Paul 'Skip' Collicott, with assistance from advanced cardiac life support personnel and the Lincoln Medical Education Foundation, produced the initial ATLS course which was held in 1978. In 1980, the American College of Surgeons Committee on Trauma adopted ATLS and began US and international dissemination of the course. Styner himself recently recertified as an ATLS instructor, teaching his Instructor Candidate course in Nottingham in the UK, July 2007, and then in the Netherlands.

Since its inception, ATLS has become the standard for trauma care in American emergency departments and advanced paramedical services. Since emergency physicians, paramedics and other advanced practitioners use ATLS as their model for trauma care it makes sense that programs for other providers caring for trauma would be designed to interface well with ATLS. The Society of Trauma Nurses has developed the Advanced Trauma Care for Nurses (ATCN) course for registered nurses. ATCN meets concurrently with ATLS and shares some of the lecture portions. This approach allows for medical and nursing care to be well-coordinated with one another as both the medical and nursing care providers have been trained in essentially the same model of care. Similarly, the National Association of Emergency Medical Technicians has developed the Prehospital Trauma Life Support (PHTLS) course for basic Emergency Medical Technicians (EMT)s and a more advanced level class for Paramedics. The International Trauma Life Support committee publishes the ITLS-Basic and ITLS-Advanced courses for prehospital professionals as well. This course is based around ATLS and allows the PHTLS-trained EMTs to work alongside paramedics and to transition smoothly into the care provided by the ATLS and ATCN-trained providers in the hospital. On March 22, 2013, the American College of Surgeons Committee on Trauma renamed their annual Award for Meritorious Service in ATLS to the James K. Styner Award for Meritorious Service in honor of Styner's contributions to trauma care.

== See also ==
- ABC (medicine)
- Advanced Cardiac Life Support
- Advanced Life Support
- Basic Life Support
- Battlefield Advanced Trauma Life Support
- Care of the Critically Ill Surgical Patient
- Definitive Surgical Trauma Skills
- List of emergency medicine courses
- Pediatric Advanced Life Support
- Trauma team
