= Definitive Surgical Trauma Skills =

The Definitive Surgical Trauma Skills course (DSTS) is a joint development between the Royal College of Surgeons of England, the Royal Centre for Defence Medicine and the Uniformed Services University of the Health Sciences in Washington DC.

Originally designed for the military, the training structure has now been adapted to accommodate civilian surgical consultants and teaches vascular, cardiothoracic and general surgery techniques which are vital in dealing with trauma injuries.

The programme follows on from the Advanced Trauma Life Support (ATLS) programme.
