= Critical Care (journal) =

- Discipline: Intensive care medicine
- Language: English
- Edited by: Jean-Louis Vincent

Publication details
- History: 1997-present
- Publisher: BioMed Central (England)
- Frequency: Continuous
- Open access: Yes
- Impact factor: 19.334 (2021)

Standard abbreviations
- ISO 4: Crit. Care

Indexing
- ISSN: 1364-8535 (print); 1466-609X (web)
- LCCN: sn98-39067
- OCLC no.: 44637976

Links
- Journal homepage

Critical Care is an online open access peer-reviewed medical journal covering intensive-care medicine. The founding editor and the current editor-in-chief is Jean-Louis Vincent of the Université Libre de Bruxelles. Critical Care was established in 1997 and is currently published by BioMed Central.

== Abstracting and Indexing ==
The journal is abstracted and indexed in:

- Biological Abstracts
- CABI
- Citebase
- Chemical Abstracts Service
- CINAHL
- Current Contents: Clinical Medicine
- DOAJ
- Embase
- EmCare
- Global Health
- MEDLINE/PubMed
- Medscape
- Nutrition & Food Sciences Database
- Nutrition Abstracts & Reviews Series A: Human & Experimental
- OAIster
- Science Citation Index Expanded
- Tropical Diseases Bulletin
- SCImago
- SOCOLAR
- SCOPUS
- Web of Science
- Zetoc

According to the Journal Citation Reports, the journal has a 2020 impact factor of 9.097, ranking it 7 out of 82 journals in the category 'Critical Care and Intensive Care Medicine'.
