= Pediatric Critical Care Medicine =

- Discipline: Intensive care pediatrics
- Language: English, Chinese
- Edited by: Robert C. Tasker

Publication details
- History: 2000–present
- Publisher: Lippincott Williams & Wilkins
- Frequency: 12/year
- Impact factor: 4.1 (2022)

Standard abbreviations
- ISO 4: Pediatr. Crit. Care Med.

Indexing
- ISSN: 1529-7535 (print); 1947-3893 (web)
- OCLC no.: 43885786

Links
- Journal homepage; Online access; Online archives

Pediatric Critical Care Medicine is a peer-reviewed medical journal that covers intensive care treatment of children and newborns. It is the official journal of the Society of Critical Care Medicine, the World Federation of Pediatric Intensive and Critical Care Societies, the Pediatric Intensive Care Society, the Latin American Society of Pediatric Intensive Care, and the Japanese Society of Pediatric Intensive and Critical Care. It was established in 2000 and is published 12 times a year by Lippincott Williams & Wilkins. The editor-in-chief is Robert C. Tasker (Boston Children's Hospital). The journal is published in Chinese, English with selected abstracts translated into Chinese, French, Italian, Japanese, Portuguese, and Spanish.

== Abstracting and indexing ==
The journal is abstracted and indexed in:

- CINAHL
- Current Contents/Clinical Medicine
- Embase
- Index Medicus/MEDLINE/PubMed
- Science Citation Index Expanded
- Scopus

According to the Journal Citation Reports, the journal has a 2013 impact factor of 2.326, ranking it 15th out of 27 journals in the category "Critical Care Medicine" and 26th out of 117 journals in the category "Pediatrics".
