= Shock (journal) =

- Discipline: Intensive care medicine
- Language: English

Publication details
- History: 1994–present
- Publisher: Lippincott Williams & Wilkins (US)
- Frequency: Monthly
- Impact factor: 3.1 (2022)

Standard abbreviations
- ISO 4: Shock

Indexing
- ISSN: 1073-2322 (print); 1540-0514 (web)

Links
- Journal homepage

Shock: Injury, Inflammation, and Sepsis: Laboratory and Clinical Approaches (ISSN 1073-2322) is the official journal of the Shock Society, the European Shock Society, the Indonesian Shock Society, the International Federation of Shock Societies, and the Official and International Journal of the Japan Shock Society. The journal publishes scholarly research reports on basic and clinical studies of shock, trauma, sepsis, inflammation, ischemia, and related pathobiological states, with particular emphasis on the biologic mechanisms that determine the response to such injury. This scholarly journal has both print and online version. The journal has an impact factor of 3.1 and publishes 12 issues per year.
