= Journal of Critical Care =

- Discipline: Intensive care medicine
- Language: English
- Edited by: Jan Bakker

Publication details
- Former name(s): Seminars in Anesthesia, Perioperative Medicine and Pain (absorbed 2007)
- History: 1986-present
- Publisher: Elsevier
- Frequency: Bimonthly
- Impact factor: 2.191 (2013)

Standard abbreviations
- ISO 4: J. Crit. Care

Indexing
- CODEN: JCCAER
- ISSN: 0883-9441 (print); 1557-8615 (web)
- OCLC no.: 12257697

Links
- Journal homepage; Online access; Online archive; Journal page on publisher's website

The Journal of Critical Care is a peer-reviewed medical journal which covers intensive care medicine. It is the official journal of the World Federation of Societies of Intensive and Critical Care Medicine and the Society for Complex Acute Illness. The editor-in-chief is Jan Bakker. It is published every two months by Elsevier.

== Abstracting and indexing ==
The journal is abstracted and indexed in:

- Academic OneFile
- Chemical Abstracts
- CINAHL
- Current Contents/Clinical Medicine
- Embase
- Index Medicus/MEDLINE/PubMed
- Science Citation Index/Science Citation Index Expanded
- Scopus

According to the Journal Citation Reports, the journal has a 2013 impact factor of 2.191, ranking it 17th out of 27 journals in the category "Critical Care Medicine".

== History ==
The journal was established in 1986. The first editor was David R. Dantzker and the original publisher was Grune & Stratton. In 2007 the Journal of Critical Care absorbed Seminars in Anesthesia, Perioperative Medicine and Pain which was previously titled Seminars in Anesthesia.
