= Intensive Care Medicine (journal) =

- Discipline: Intensive care medicine
- Language: English
- Edited by: Samir Jaber

Publication details
- Former name(s): European Journal of Intensive Care Medicine
- History: 1975–present
- Publisher: Springer Science+Business Media
- Frequency: Monthly
- Open access: Hybrid
- Impact factor: 41.787 (2021)

Standard abbreviations
- ISO 4: Intensive Care Med.

Indexing
- CODEN: ICMED9
- ISSN: 0342-4642 (print); 1432-1238 (web)
- OCLC no.: 884609077

Links
- Journal homepage; Online access

Intensive Care Medicine is a monthly peer-reviewed medical journal covering intensive care or critical care and emergency medicine. It was established in 1975 as the European Journal of Intensive Care Medicine and obtained its current name in 1977. It is the official journal of the European Society of Intensive Care Medicine. The editor-in-chief is Prof. Samir Jaber (University Hospital of Montpellier). It is published by Springer Science+Business Media.

"Intensive Care Medicine" is the publication platform for communicating and exchanging current work and ideas in intensive care medicine. It is intended for all those who are involved in intensive medical care, physicians, anaesthetists, surgeons, paediatricians, as well as those concerned with pre-clinical subjects and medical sciences basic to these disciplines. The journal publishes: review articles reflecting the present state of knowledge in special areas or summarizing limited themes in which discussion has led to clearly defined conclusions; original papers reporting progress and results in all areas of intensive care medicine and its related fields; educational articles giving information on the progress of a topic of particular interest; discussion on technology, methods, new apparatus and modifications of standard techniques; brief reports of uncommon and interesting disorders; correspondence concerning matters of topical interest or relating to published material.

== Abstracting and indexing ==
The journal is abstracted and indexed in:

- Academic OneFile
- Academic Search
- CAB Abstracts
- Chemical Abstracts Service
- CINAHL
- CSA Environmental Sciences
- Current Contents/Clinical Medicine
- EBSCO databases
- Embase
- EMCare
- Expanded Academic
- Global Health
- Health Reference Center Academic
- Index Medicus/MEDLINE/PubMed
- Index to Scientific & Technical Proceedings
- INIS Atomindex
- Science Citation Index
- Scopus
- Tropical Diseases Bulletin

According to the Journal Citation Reports, the journal has a 2021 impact factor of 41.787, ranking it 2 out of 82 journals in the category 'Critical Care and Intensive Care Medicine'.
