= Critical Care Medicine (journal) =

- Discipline: Intensive care medicine
- Language: English
- Edited by: Jonathan E. Sevransky

Publication details
- History: 1973-present
- Publisher: Lippincott Williams & Wilkins on behalf of the Society of Critical Care Medicine
- Frequency: Monthly
- Open access: Hybrid open-access
- Impact factor: 7.5 (2025)

Standard abbreviations
- ISO 4: Crit. Care Med.

Indexing
- CODEN: CCMDC7
- ISSN: 0090-3493 (print); 1530-0293 (web)
- LCCN: 73647665
- OCLC no.: 772657699

Links
- Journal homepage; Online access; Online archives

Critical Care Medicine is a peer-reviewed monthly medical journal that focuses on intensive care medicine. Founded in 1973 by William C. Shoemaker, the journal serves as the official publication of the Society of Critical Care Medicine. It is published by Lippincott Williams & Wilkins and led by editor-in-chief Jonathan E. Sevransky.

== Abstracting and indexing ==
The journal is abstracted and indexed in:

- Academic Search
- CAB Abstracts
- Chemical Abstracts
- CINAHL
- Current Contents - Clinical Medicine
- Embase
- Global Health
- Index Medicus/MEDLINE/PubMed
- Science Citation Index Expanded
- Scopus
- Tropical Diseases Bulletin

According to the Journal Citation Reports, the journal has a 2020 impact factor of 7.598, ranking it 5th out of 82 journals in the category "'Critical Care and Intensive Care Medicine".

== Editors ==
- William C. Shoemaker, 1972-1991
- Bart Chernow, 1991-1997
- Joseph E. Parrillo, 1997-2014
- Timothy G. Buchman, 2015–2025
- Jonathan E. Sevransky, 2026-present
