= 1988 in games =

This page lists board and card games, wargames, miniatures games, and tabletop role-playing games published in 1988. For video games, see 1988 in video gaming.

== Games invented or released in 1988 ==
- 2300 AD (role-playing game)
- Abalone
- Ad Astra (role-playing game)
- Barbarossa
- Buck Rogers - Battle for the 25th Century
- Cyberpunk 2013 (role-playing game)
- Dirty Minds
- Empires & Dynasties
- Free Parking
- Girl Talk
- Fun House
- Kremlin
- Macho Women with Guns (role-playing game)
- Merchant of Venus
- Ninjas and Superspies (role-playing game)
- Pizza Wars Imperium
- Scattergories
- Sky Galleons of Mars
- Space: 1889 (role-playing game)
- Trauma

== Game awards given in 1988 ==
- Spiel des Jahres: Barbarossa

== Deaths ==
| Date | Name | Age | Notability |
|---|---|---|---|
| August 27 | Kerry Lloyd | 46 | RPG designer, founder of Gamelords |
| August 29 | David A. Hargrave | 42 | RPG designer, inventor of Arduin |
| August 29 | Jack Scruby | 72 | Manufacturer of military and wargames miniatures |
| September 13 | Peter Young | 73 | Wargaming author |
| December 10 | Eleanor Abbott | 78 | Designer of Candy Land |

== See also ==
- 1988 in video gaming
