= N,N-Didesmethyltamoxifen =

Chemical compound

Clinical data
- Other names: Dinortamoxifen

Identifiers
- IUPAC name: 2-[4-[(Z)-1,2-diphenylbut-1-enyl]phenoxy]ethanamine
- CAS Number: 80234-20-4
- PubChem CID: 3036172
- ChemSpider: 2300247
- UNII: LHP6JE56UZ
- KEGG: C16548
- ChEBI: CHEBI:80556
- ChEMBL: ChEMBL1743350
- CompTox Dashboard (EPA): DTXSID501314338

Chemical and physical data
- Formula: C_{24}H_{25}NO
- Molar mass: 343.470 g·mol^{−1}
- 3D model (JSmol): Interactive image
- SMILES: CC/C(=C(\C1=CC=CC=C1)/C2=CC=C(C=C2)OCCN)/C3=CC=CC=C3
- InChI: InChI=1S/C24H25NO/c1-2-23(19-9-5-3-6-10-19)24(20-11-7-4-8-12-20)21-13-15-22(16-14-21)26-18-17-25/h3-16H,2,17-18,25H2,1H3/b24-23-; Key:MCJKBWHDNUSJLW-VHXPQNKSSA-N

N,N-Desmethyltamoxifen is a metabolite of tamoxifen, a selective estrogen receptor modulator (SERM). It is formed from N-desmethyltamoxifen and is an intermediate in the conversion of tamoxifen and N-desmethyltamoxifen into norendoxifen (4-hydroxy-N,N-desmethyltamoxifen), an active metabolite of tamoxifen.
