= Idiopathic sclerosing mesenteritis =

- Other names: ISM
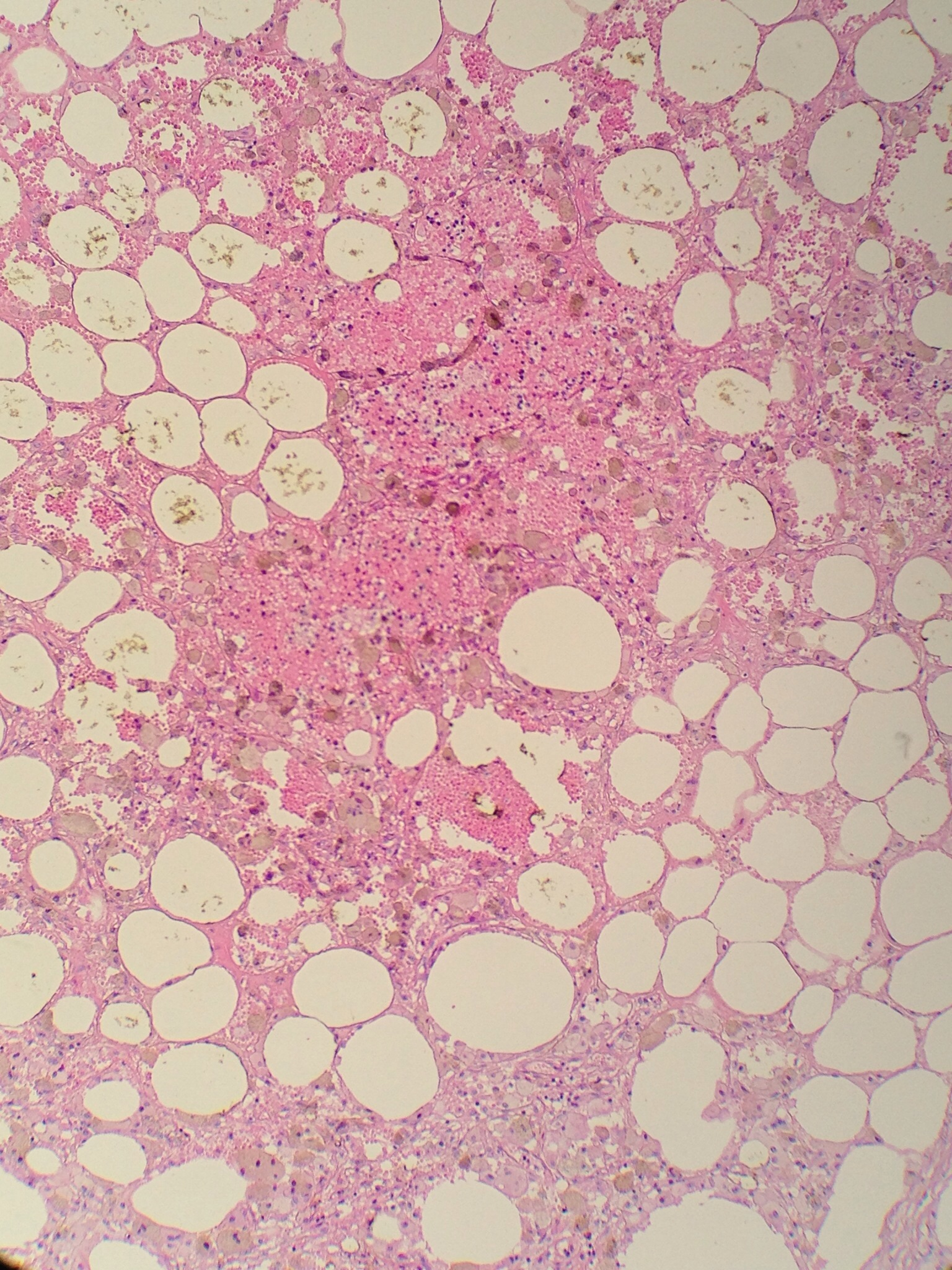
- Sclerosing mesenteritis - note the hemosiderin, chronic inflammation
- Causes: Not known
- Risk factors: Autoimmune disorder, abdominal trauma, history of infection
- Diagnostic method: CT scan
- Treatment: Corticosteroids may be used

Idiopathic sclerosing mesenteritis (ISM) is a rare disease of the small intestine, characterized by chronic inflammation and eventual fibrosis of the mesentery. It has also been called mesenteric lipodystrophy, or retractile mesenteritis.

== Signs and symptoms ==
Sclerosing mesenteritis may present with no or nearly no signs or symptoms, but many people have chronic and severe pain in the abdomen as the most common chief complaint. Other people have chronic problems with bowel movements, resulting in diarrhea, bloating, gas, and cramping which can range from severe to mild.The disorder is identified by histopathology showing fat necrosis, fibrosis and chronic inflammation of the small intestine. Examination of the mesentery may indicate a solitary mass, but diffuse mesentery thickening is common.

== Mechanism ==
Several causes of sclerosing mesenteritis have been suggested such as trauma, prior surgical procedures, autoimmune diseases such as lupus, IgG4-related disease, rheumatoid arthritis, infections such as tuberculosis, cryptococcosis, schistosomiasis, HIV and medicines such as paroxetine and pergolide but their associations with sclerosing mesenteritis are largely speculative with high degree of bias.

== Diagnosis ==
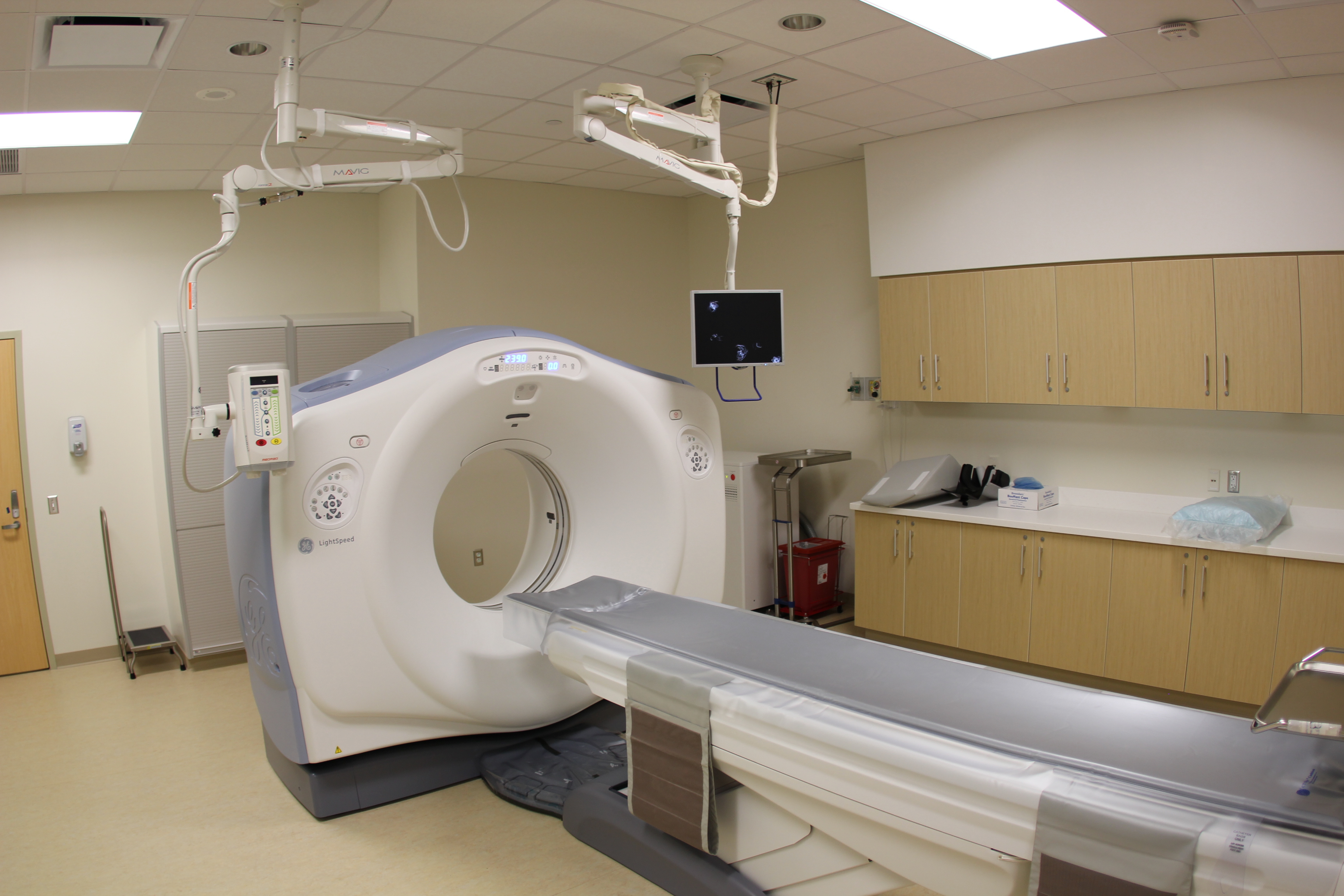
CTscan

In regards to the diagnosis of idiopathic sclerosing mesenteritis, a CT scan which creates cross-section pictures of the affected individuals body, can help in the assessment of the disease. "Misty mesentery" is often used to describe increase in mesenteric fat density in sclerosing mesenteritis. However, it is not specific and can be found in other conditions such as mesenteric oedema, lymphedema, haemorrhage, and presence of neoplastic and inflammatory cells must be excluded. Mesenteric lymph nodes are rarely larger than 10 mm in sclerosing mesenteritis. Larger lymph nodes should prompt further investigations with PET scan or biopsy.MRI scan may show an intermediate T1 intensity and variable T2 intensity depending on degree of oedema and fibrosis. Presence of oedema causes high T2 signal while fibrosis causes low T2 signal.

=== Differential diagnosis ===
It often mimics other abdominal diseases such as pancreatic or disseminated cancer. CT scanning is important for making the initial diagnosis.

== Treatment ==
In terms of possible treatment for the condition of idiopathic sclerosing mesenteritis, medications such as corticosteroids, tamoxifen and thalidomide have been used.

== Epidemiology ==
The epidemiology of Idiopathic sclerosing mesenteritis disease is extremely rare and has only been diagnosed in about an estimated 300 patients worldwide to date (as of 2014), it is probably under diagnosed. It can occur in children.

== Research ==
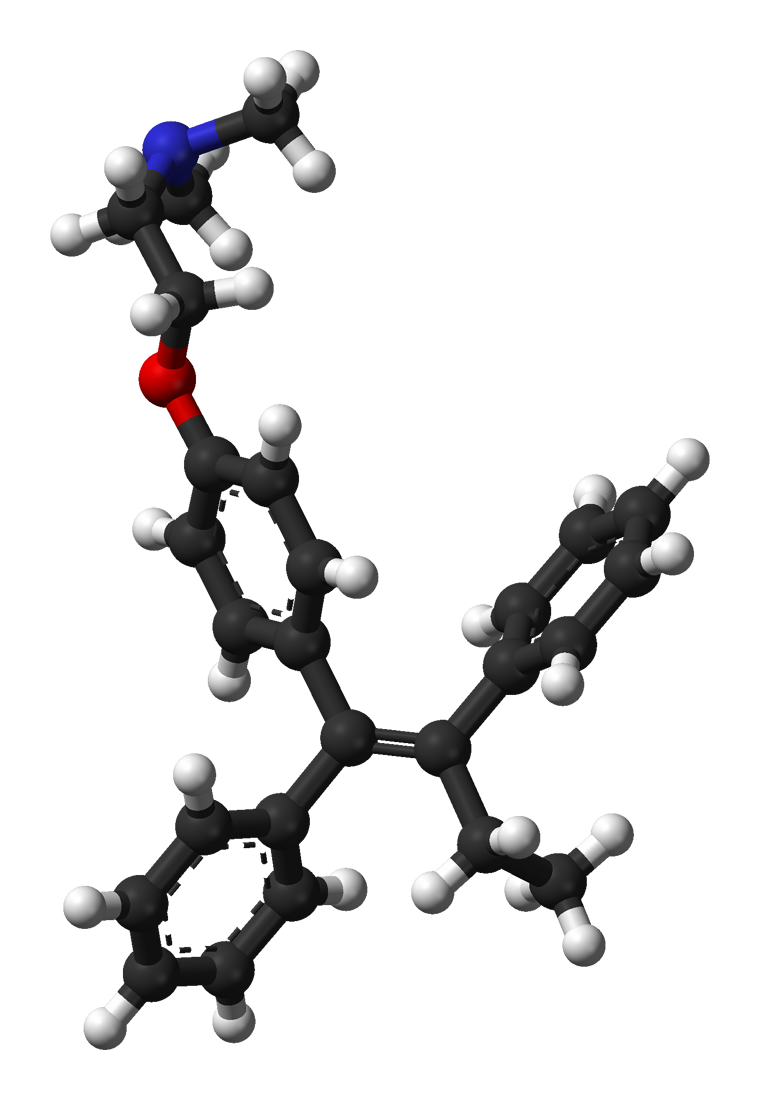
Chemical structure of tamoxifen

The Mayo Clinic in Rochester reported a large study of 92 patients, with widely ranging severity of their symptoms. The majority were male, with an average age of 65 years. They commonly had abdominal pain (70%), diarrhea (25%), and weight loss (23%). Depending on the stage of the scarring and fibrosis, several different treatments, including surgery for bowel obstruction, or drugs were used to halt the progression of the disease.

In that case series, 56% of patients received only pharmacological therapy, most often receiving tamoxifen with a reducing dose of reducing prednisone, or also had colchicine, azathioprine or thalidomide.

Their findings suggest that sclerosing mesenteritis can be debilitating although relatively benign. Symptomatic patients benefited from medical therapy, usually tamoxifen and prednisone, but further follow-up information would strengthen these results.

== See also ==
- Small intestine and the abdomen
