= Trauma =

Trauma most often refers to:

- Psychological trauma, in psychology and psychiatric medicine, refers to severe mental and emotional injury caused by distressing events
- Traumatic injury, sudden physical injury caused by an external force, which does not rise to the level of major trauma
  - Major trauma, in physical medicine, severe physical injury caused by an external source

Trauma may also refer to:

== Medicine ==
- Birth trauma, trauma incurred by neonates during childbirth
- Dental trauma, trauma to the teeth, gums, and nearby soft tissues
- Trauma team, a multidisciplinary group of healthcare workers who collectively work together
- Traumatic alopecia, a cutaneous condition that results from the forceful pulling out of the scalp hair
- Traumatic anserine folliculosis, a gooseflesh-like follicular hyperkeratosis
- Traumatic bone cyst, a condition of the jaws
- Traumatic neuroma, a type of neuroma which results from trauma to a nerve, usually during a surgical procedure
- Traumatology, scientific study of injuries caused by external sources

=== Journals ===
- Trauma (journal), a quarterly peer-reviewed medical journal
- Trauma, Violence, & Abuse, a peer-reviewed academic journal that covers research

== Arts, entertainment, and media ==
=== Films ===
- Trauma (1962 film), an American film by Robert M. Young
- Red Rings of Fear (1978), a film sometimes known as Trauma
- Trauma (1993 film), a horror film by Dario Argento
- Trauma (2004 film), a psychological thriller by Marc Evans

=== Music ===
==== Groups and record labels ====
- Trauma (American band), an American heavy metal band
- Trauma (German band), a German trance band
- Trauma (Polish band), a Polish death metal band
- Trauma Records, a record label

==== Albums ====
- Trauma (DJ Quik album), 2005
- Trauma (I Prevail album), 2019

==== Songs ====
- "Trauma", by Ayumi Hamasaki from A and Loveppears, 1999
- "Trauma", by Doja Cat, 2014
- "Trauma", by Exo from Love Shot, 2018
- "Trauma", by Irisé featuring Takanashi Kiara, 2026
- "Trauma", by NF from The Search, 2019
- "Trauma", by PartyNextDoor from Partymobile, 2020
- "Trauma", by Seventeen from Teen, Age, 2017
- "Trauma", by SF9 from Rumination, 2021
- "Day Twelve: Trauma", by Ayreon from The Human Equation, 2004

=== Television ===
- Trauma (Canadian TV series), a 2010 medical drama set in Montreal
- Trauma (American TV series), a 2009 medical drama set in San Francisco
- Trauma (British TV series), a 2018 miniseries set in London
- "Trauma" (Gimme Gimme Gimme), a 2001 episode

=== Other uses in arts, entertainment, and media ===
- Trauma (comics), a character associated with Avengers: The Initiative in the Marvel Universe
- Trauma (novel), a 2008 novel by British author Patrick McGrath
- Trauma (video game), a 2011 graphic adventure game
- Trauma (role-playing game), a 1988 role-playing game
- Trauma Studios, an American computer game development company

== Sports ==
- Los Traumas, a Mexican professional wrestling tag team
- Trauma (wrestler)
- Trauma II (born 1982), Mexican luchador enmascarado, or masked professional wrestler

== See also ==
- Beautiful Trauma, an album by Pink
- Troma Entertainment, film company specializing in independent, horror, and exploitation films
