= Traum =

Traum (German for "dream") may refer to:

== Businesses and organizations ==
- Traum (marque), a Chinese automobile marque owned by Zotye

== Music ==
=== Record labels ===
- Traum Schallplatten, Cologne-based German minimal techno record label

=== Songs ===
- Der Traum, musical pantomime in two acts, MH 84, Michael Haydn and Florian Reichssiegel
- "Traum", song by Franz Berwald (1796-1868)
- "Traum", song by Franz Schreker (1878-1934)
- "Der Traum", D213 (Holty) by Schubert
- "Nacht und Träume", D827 by Schubert
- "Der Traum", Op. 29 No. 2 by Sigismond Thalberg (1812-1871)
- "Der Traum", Op. 21 by János Fusz (1777-1819)
- "Ein Traum", song by Mathilde von Kralik
- "Ein Traum", song by Edvard Grieg
- "Traum" (Cro song), 2014 single by German rapper Cro
- "DJ Traum", 1999 single by the German synthpop band Melotron, taken from album Mörderwerk

== People ==
- Artie Traum (1943–2008), American New Age guitarist, producer and songwriter
- Dick Traum, founder of the Achilles Track Club for disabled athletes
- Happy Traum (1938–2024), American folk musician

== See also ==
- Trauma (disambiguation)
