= Dora Richardson =

British organic chemist

Dora Nellie Richardson
- Dora Richardson
- Born: 1919
- Died: 1998
- Alma Mater: University of College London
- Institutions: Imperial Chemical Industries, AstraZeneca

Dora Nellie Richardson (June 1, 1919- September 15, 1998) was a British organic chemist, known for first synthesizing Tamoxifen (ICI-46,474), a groundbreaking targeted therapy for hormone-sensitive breast cancer, in England in 1962. Her research marked a turning point in oncology. Tamoxifen's ability to selectively block estrogen receptors revolutionized breast cancer treatment by offering a more precise and less toxic alternative to traditional chemotherapy. Her pioneering work laid the foundation for modern endocrine therapies and remains a cornerstone of breast cancer treatment today. Richardson was named on several patents.

== Early life and education ==
Richardson was born in Wimbledon, South London, in 1919. Inspired by a visit to the Cancer Hospital (now Royal Marsden), where her grandmother received treatment, she resolved to pursue chemistry. In 1939, Richardson enrolled at University College London (UCL) to study chemistry, a field dominated by men. She was one of the few women in her program and excluded from societies and networks that could have supported her early career development. Pursuing higher education during World War II added further challenges. In her final year, the German bombing campaign, known as the Blitz, intensified, which forced UCL to evacuate students to Wales. Despite these challenges, she completed her Bachelor of Science in 1941 and pursued a career in synthetic chemistry.

== Research and career ==
In the 1940s, female chemists faced systemic barriers, including limited job prospects, lack of upward mobility, and lower wages compared to male counterparts, and expectations to leave employment upon marriage. Richardson experienced these challenges firsthand and struggled to find a job in an academic setting after graduation. In 1943, Richardson joined the Dyestuffs Division at Imperial Chemical Industries (ICI), a leading British chemical company now a part of AstraZeneca, where she became one of the few senior female chemists. Determined to advance in her field, she pursued her doctoral studies while working at ICI, earning her Ph.D. in 1953 with a dissertation on the synthesis of heterocyclic compounds.

At ICI, Richardson initially contributed to the synthesis of antimalarial compounds essential to the British war effort. In 1959, Dr. Arthur Walpole, a leading researcher in hormone-based therapies at ICI, recruited Richardson to join his team. In 1960, the American pharmaceutical company Searle launched the first approved oral contraceptive amid growing global interest in birth control. That same year, Walpole became head of ICI’s newly established Fertility Regulation Division, which was focused on developing contraceptive pills.

Tamoxifen Structural Formula

In 1962, Richardson successfully synthesized ICI-46,474 (later known as tamoxifen) using geometric isomerism, as part of a project to develop a contraceptive pill.^{[8][6][7][4][9]} It was the first selective estrogen receptor modulator (SERM) and Richardson’s efforts were formally recognized in 1965 with the U.K. patent 1099093. However, early studies showed that rather than suppress ovulation, tamoxifen stimulated it, making it unsuitable as a contraceptive. Further research revealed its ability to inhibit estrogen-sensitive tumor growth with minimal side effects, positioning it as a potential breast cancer treatment.

Despite these promising results, ICI executives believed a cancer drug would not be as profitable as a contraceptive drug and decided to abandon the project in 1972. Richardson and her colleagues, however, remained convinced of its potential. Their perseverance ensured tamoxifen was eventually recognized as a pioneering treatment for breast cancer. They continued their work clandestinely until Walpole threatened to resign unless ICI resumed official research, leading to the drug’s formal development.

In October 1973, tamoxifen was launched in the U.K. as a palliative treatment for advanced breast cancer. By the 1980s, additional trials revealed that tamoxifen was also effective as an adjuvant therapy alongside surgery and chemotherapy for early-stage breast cancer. Later, trials demonstrated its ability to prevent the recurrence of breast cancer and reduce the risk of developing the disease in high-risk women, making it the first FDA-approved chemopreventive agent for any cancer.

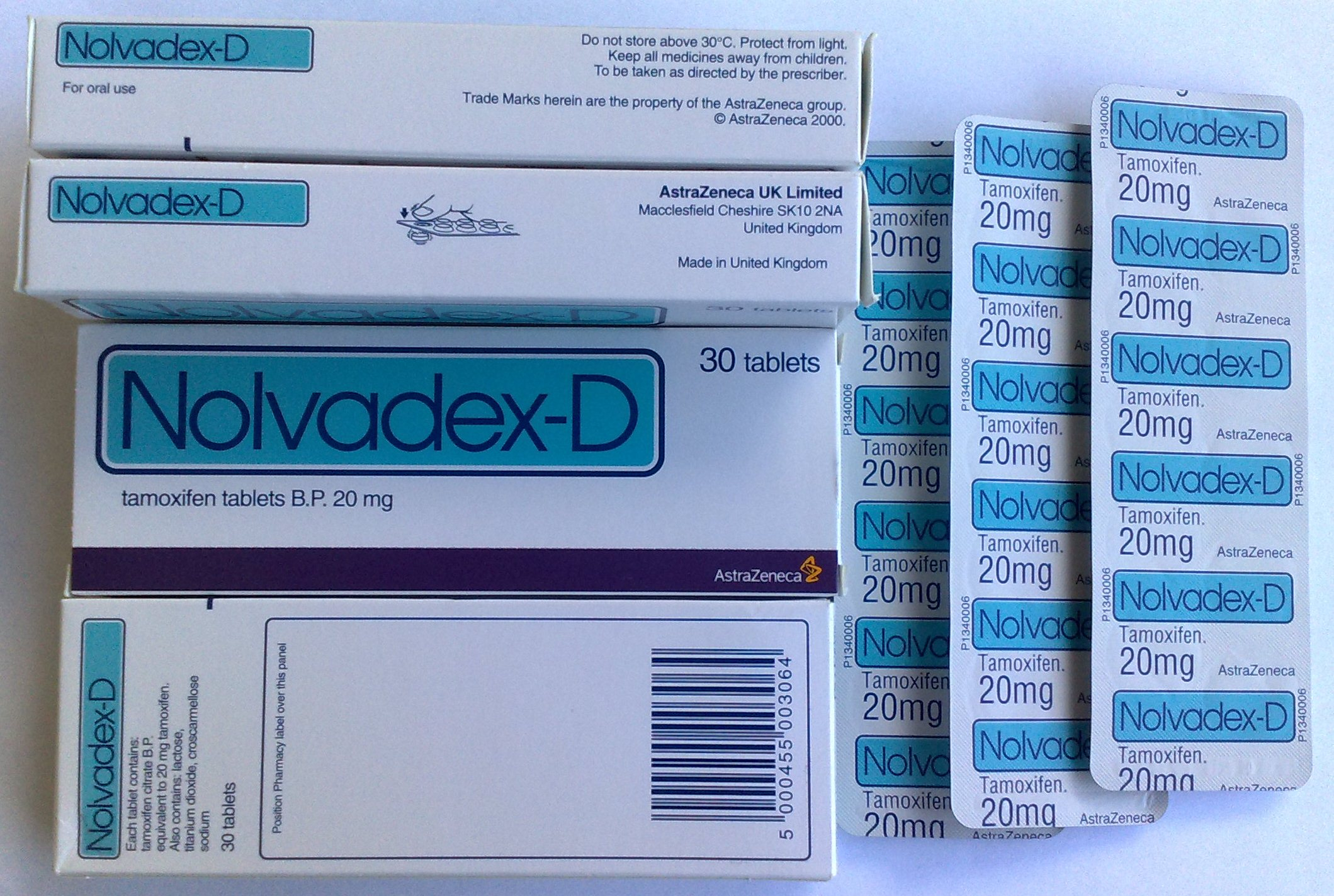
Nolvadex

Tamoxifen was groundbreaking as the first targeted therapy for hormone-sensitive breast cancer, shifting the paradigm from broad chemotherapy approaches to more precise hormone-based treatments. Richardson's synthesis of tamoxifen provided the foundation for researchers to study its interaction with estrogen receptors, leading to the discovery that it could selectively inhibit estrogen-driven tumor growth. This targeted mechanism revolutionized cancer treatment by offering an alternative to traditional chemotherapy, allowing for more effective management of estrogen-dependent tumors while minimizing damage to healthy tissues. At a time when very toxic chemotherapy dominated cancer treatment, tamoxifen provided a pioneering, safer alternative. This innovation laid the groundwork for the development of other SERMs and modern endocrine therapies.

A year after tamoxifen's introduction, pharmacologist Craig Jordan joined the research efforts and played a key role in expanding its clinical applications. While Jordan’s contributions helped solidify tamoxifen’s place in cancer treatment, his prominence often overshadowed the extensive work done by Richardson and her team over the previous 14 years. In later years, Jordan became widely known as the 'father of tamoxifen,' a title that downplayed the foundational chemical synthesis performed by Richardson.

In a paper commemorating the 50th anniversary of tamoxifen’s first clinical trial, Jordan briefly mentioned Richardson, referring to her only as a 'talented organic chemist'. This minimal acknowledgment contributed to the historical erasure of her contributions. The lack of broader recognition compounded over time, and on July 3, 2024, The New York Timespublished Jordan’s obituary crediting him with discovering tamoxifen’s ability to block estrogen-driven tumor growth, further diminishing Richardson’s role in its development.

Despite this, Richardson's early work in synthesizing and refining tamoxifen was fundamental to its eventual success. In 1980, shortly before her retirement, she documented her contributions in an unpublished paper, The History of Nolvadex. Unfortunately that document remained largely hidden amongst the company’s archives.

== Legacy and impact ==
The development of tamoxifen was a significant breakthrough in the treatment of breast cancer, the most common cancer among women in 86 percent of countries. Tamoxifen was the first selective estrogen receptor modulator (SERM) and the first medication approved to reduce breast cancer incidence in high-risk women, marking a shift toward targeted cancer therapies.

Over time, tamoxifen's use evolved from treating advanced-stage cancer to becoming a standard therapy for early-stage hormone receptor-positive breast cancer. It was eventually approved to reduce the risk of recurrence after surgery and became the first drug for breast cancer prevention in high-risk patients.

Tamoxifen was approved in the U.S. in 1977. By the mid-1980s, the National Institute of Heath recognized it as the treatment of choice for breast cancer due to its ability to prolong life following surgery. It later became a recognized preventative treatment and was added to the World Health Organization's essential medicines list due to its accessibility and effectiveness. Today, tamoxifen remains one of the world's most widely prescribed breast cancer treatments.

== Personal life ==
Richardson enjoyed gardening, needlework, and the companionship of a pet parakeet. She was a lifelong Protestant and a founding member of her local Soroptimist Club, an organization dedicated to empowering women through education. Richardson died in 1998.
