= C24H25NO3 =

The molecular formula C_{24}H_{25}NO_{3} may refer to:

- Benzylmorphine, an opioid analgesic
- Cyphenothrin, a pyrethroid insecticide
- 4'-Hydroxynorendoxifen
- N-Phenethylnormorphine
