= Norendoxifen =

Chemical compound

Clinical data
- Other names: 4-Hydroxy-N,N-didesmethyltamoxifen

Identifiers
- IUPAC name: 4-[(Z)-1-[4-(2-Aminoethoxy)phenyl]-2-phenylbut-1-enyl]phenol
- CAS Number: 1217237-98-3
- PubChem CID: 68037237
- DrugBank: DBMET00963
- ChemSpider: 32817000
- UNII: 51GJD354B5
- ChEMBL: ChEMBL2386284
- CompTox Dashboard (EPA): DTXSID701337073

Chemical and physical data
- Formula: C_{24}H_{25}NO_{2}
- Molar mass: 359.469 g·mol^{−1}
- 3D model (JSmol): Interactive image
- SMILES: CCC(=C(c1ccc(cc1)O)c2ccc(cc2)OCCN)c3ccccc3
- InChI: InChI=1S/C24H25NO2/c1-2-23(18-6-4-3-5-7-18)24(19-8-12-21(26)13-9-19)20-10-14-22(15-11-20)27-17-16-25/h3-15,26H,2,16-17,25H2,1H3; Key:YCQBLTPGQSYLHD-UHFFFAOYSA-N

Norendoxifen, also known as 4-hydroxy-N,N-didesmethyltamoxifen, is a nonsteroidal aromatase inhibitor (AI) of the triphenylethylene group that was never marketed.

It is an active metabolite of the selective estrogen receptor modulator (SERM) tamoxifen. Unlike tamoxifen, norendoxifen is not a SERM, and instead has been found to act as a potent and selective competitive inhibitor of aromatase (K_{i} = 35 nM). Drugs with dual SERM and AI activity, such as 4'-hydroxynorendoxifen, have been developed from norendoxifen, and may have therapeutic potential as antiestrogens in the treatment of estrogen receptor-positive breast cancer.

== See also ==
- Afimoxifene (4-hydroxytamoxifen)
- Endoxifen (4-hydroxy-N-desmethyltamoxifen)
