= 4'-Hydroxynorendoxifen =

Chemical compound

Clinical data
- Other names: N,N-Didesmethyl-4,4'-dihydroxytamoxifen

Identifiers
- IUPAC name: 4,4'-(1-(4-(2-Aminoethoxy)phenyl)but-1-ene-1,2-diyl)diphenol
- CAS Number: 1946764-65-3
- PubChem CID: 159419575
- ChemSpider: 58967386

Chemical and physical data
- Formula: C_{24}H_{25}NO_{3}
- Molar mass: 375.468 g·mol^{−1}
- 3D model (JSmol): Interactive image
- SMILES: CCC(=C(C1=CC=C(O)C=C1)C1=CC=C(OCCN)C=C1)C1=CC=C(O)C=C1
- InChI: InChI=1S/C24H25NO3/c1-2-23(17-3-9-20(26)10-4-17)24(18-5-11-21(27)12-6-18)19-7-13-22(14-8-19)28-16-15-25/h3-14,26-27H,2,15-16,25H2,1H3; Key:VYSGWFCGFKTGQC-UHFFFAOYSA-N

4'-Hydroxynorendoxifen is a synthetic, nonsteroidal antiestrogen of the triphenylethylene group. It is a dual selective estrogen receptor modulator (SERM) and aromatase inhibitor (AI), and was derived from tamoxifen, a SERM, and norendoxifen, a metabolite of tamoxifen that has been found to act as an AI. The drug has been suggested for potential development as a treatment for estrogen receptor (ER)-positive breast cancer. It was synthesized in 2015.
