= Buck Rogers – Battle for the 25th Century =

Board game

Buck Rogers – Battle for the 25th Century is a strategy board game published in 1988 by TSR, Inc.

== Gameplay ==
The game uses the setting and themes of the 1930s Buck Rogers serials, and the design of 1950s space-race-era propaganda. The units and game-play for the game work similarly to Axis & Allies, with naval units being replaced by spaceship and two different kinds of infantry instead of one. The game was produced in large quantities, but never sold well and never published a third edition.

The game does have some important distinctions from Axis & Allies which help differentiate it. There are several primary differences. First, unlike Axis and Allies, any area is suspect to be attacked by fighters (ships) at any time (Fighters can take land and areas). This means that there is no set area where a land invasion must creep along unless a player chooses to attack by land. Second, combat units do not hit on a set combat value, instead, the combat value is determined by what unit is attacking, and what unit is defending. For example, a Trooper would hit another trooper with a score of 6, whilst a Trooper would need to hit a Fighter with a score of 7. Third, there is NO set starting position. Positions are determined by a random dealing of cards (6 cards for 4-6 players, 9 cards for 3 players, and 12 cards for 2 players). Fourth, there is no money or research. One builds units dependent on how many factories they have. Each factory can produce a certain number of units per turn. Fifth, The game has leaders, which either give a +2 to combat rolls in the basic rules of the game, or have special abilities which can grant unique advantages over his/her opponents in the advanced rules of the game. Finally, players fight over planets and moons revolving around the Sun, making for a constantly shifting game board.

== Reception ==
In Issue 2 of Games International, the board game was named the magazine's "Game of the Month". In a lengthy review, Mike Siggins lauded the game for being good value, pointing out that "The box is the same size as the Milton Bradley games it competes with and is packed to the brim with high-quality components." He also noted that "the game is priced very competitively and certainly offers far better value that board games of a similar price." Siggins liked the challenging victory criteriae and the "opened-ended and flexible design." He also thought "the play balance is very good, tactical options are plentiful, the action is fast so the game is not overly long; but most of all it's eminently expandable." He concluded by giving the game a perfect rating of 5 out of 5, saying, "Buck Rogers is very probably the best game TSR have ever produced, it is definitely an all-round winner."

Tony Watson reviewed Buck Rogers – Battle for the 25th Century in Space Gamer/Fantasy Gamer No. 85. Watson commented that "Buck Rogers is a nice try, but I'll still wait for [Milton Bradley] to try their hand at an SF game in the format they've made famous."

== Reviews ==
- Casus Belli #48
