= Ovariectomized rat =

An ovariectomized rodent (OVX) is a female rat or mouse whose ovaries have been removed. Currently, there is no single animal model that precisely replicates the stages of osteoporosis in humans, although there are some animals that are relatively close and can be used for comparative purposes. Both small and large animals are used depending on the specific aspects of the osteoporotic condition under investigation. Examples of such animals include rats, rabbits, and sheep.

Of these animal models, the ovariectomised rat model remains the most popular choice as it has been validated to represent the most important clinical features of estrogen deficiency-induced (or postmenopausal) bone loss in the adult human, particularly during the early stages of osteoporosis. These include: increased rate of bone turnover with resorption exceeding formation; an initial rapid phase of bone loss followed by a much slower phase; greater loss of cancellous bone than cortical bone; reduced intestinal calcium absorption; some protection against bone loss by obesity; and similar skeletal response to therapy with estrogen, tamoxifen, bisphosphonates, parathyroid hormone, calcitonin and exercise.

It also offers certain advantages compared the other animal models like rabbits and sheep. These include the ability to use peripheral micro-computed tomography (pQmicro-CT) in in vivo micro-CT to perform in vivo analyses, cost-effectiveness, and ease of handling and housing. Because of these considerations, the OVX rat model is widely used for the studies relating to the prevention and treatment of osteoporosis in general as well as studies relating to the healing of osteoporotic fractures.
