= V. Craig Jordan =

American-British pharmacologist (1947–2024)

V. Craig Jordan CMG OBE
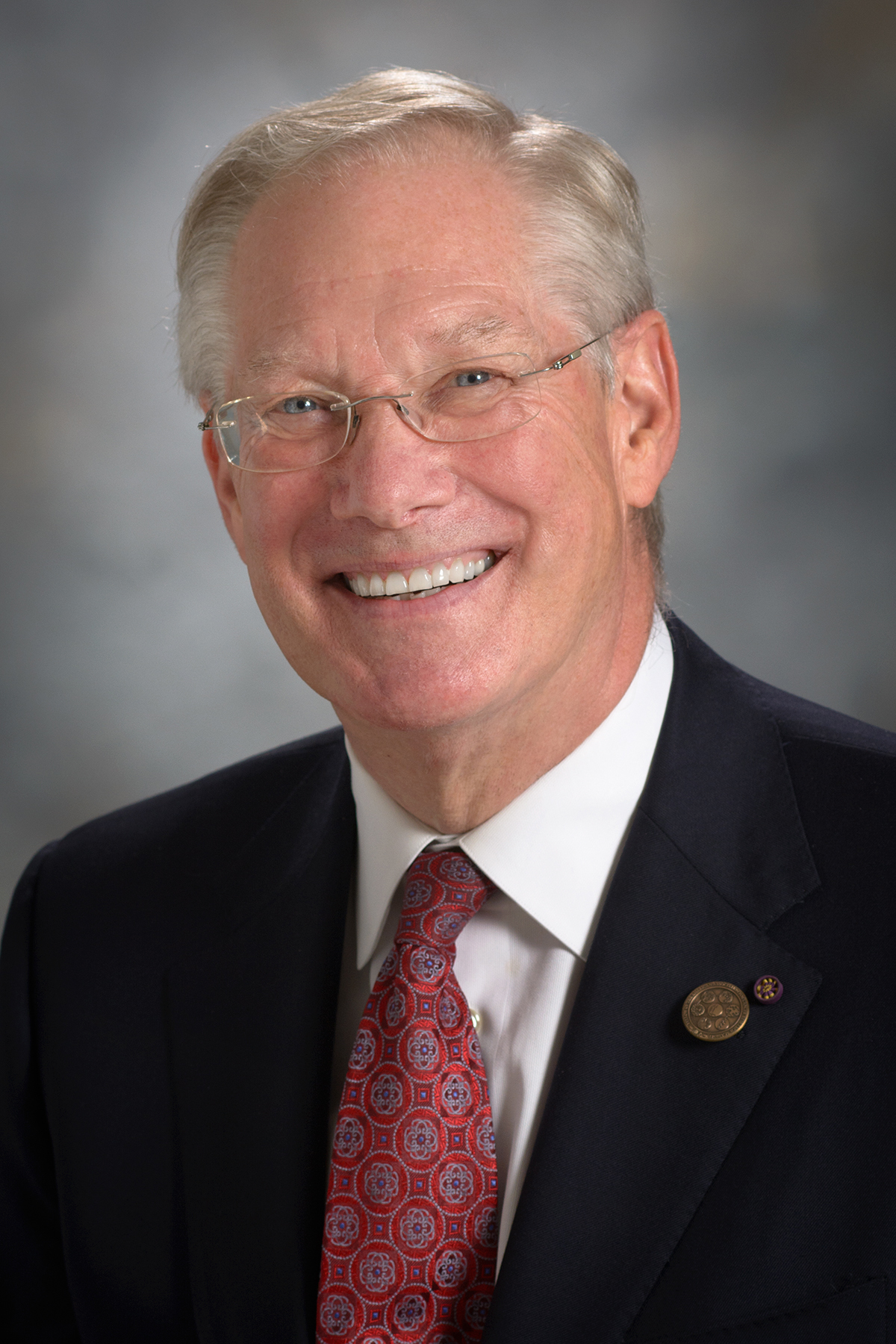
- V. Craig Jordan
- Born: July 25, 1947; New Braunfels, Texas, U.S.
- Died: June 9, 2024 (aged 76); Houston, Texas, U.S.
- Education: University of Leeds
- Known for: "Father of Tamoxifen"; Research on SERMs, particularly tamoxifen and raloxifene
- Awards: Fellow, Academy of Medical Sciences; Kettering Prize; American Cancer Society Medal of Honor; American Society of Clinical Oncology; David A. Karnofsky Award and Lecture; FMedSci; Elected Member National Academy of Sciences; St. Gallen Prize (Switzerland); Elected Fellow AACR Academy; ASCO 50 Oncology Luminaries; The Academy of Medicine, Engineering and Science of Texas; Cameron Prize for Therapeutics of the University of Edinburgh (1993)
- Scientific career
- Fields: Pharmacology, Cancer Research
- Workplaces: University of Texas MD Anderson Cancer Center; University of Leeds; Ludwig Institute, Bern, Switzerland; University of Wisconsin–Madison; Northwestern University; Fox Chase Cancer Center; Georgetown University

Virgil Craig Jordan, CMG, OBE, FMedSci, (July 25, 1947 – June 9, 2024) was an American and British scientist specializing in drugs for breast cancer treatment and prevention. He was Professor of Breast Medical Oncology, and Professor of Molecular and Cellular Oncology at the University of Texas MD Anderson Cancer Center, Houston, Texas. Previously, he was Scientific Director and Vice Chairman of Oncology at the Lombardi Comprehensive Cancer Center of Georgetown University. Jordan was the first to discover the breast cancer prevention properties of tamoxifen and the scientific principles for adjuvant therapy with antihormones. His later work branched out into the prevention of multiple diseases in women with the discovery of the drug group, selective estrogen receptor modulator (SERMs). He later worked on developing a new Hormone Replacement Therapy (HRT) for post-menopausal women that prevents breast cancer and does not increase the risk of breast cancer.

Jordan's paper The Effect of Raloxifene on Risk of Breast Cancer in Postmenopausal Women: Results from the More Randomized Trial was one of the top 20 most cited papers in breast cancer research during 2003 and 2004.

== Early life ==
Born in New Braunfels, Texas, Jordan moved to England with his family as a child. He went to school at Moseley Hall Grammar School in Cheshire before attending the University of Leeds where he received BSc, PhD and DSc degrees in pharmacology.

== Research career ==
Jordan began working on the structure-activity of anti-estrogens as part of his PhD program at Leeds University. During that time, he met Arthur Walpole, the patent holder for the drug that became tamoxifen.

In September 1972, Jordan became a visiting scientist at the Worcester Foundation for Experimental Biology, Massachusetts. While there he began researching the idea that tamoxifen, a selective estrogen receptor modulator (SERM), could block estrogen receptors in breast tumors. Estrogen receptors in breast tumors attract estrogen which is then absorbed into the cancerous cell and encourages the cell to divide, causing the cancer to grow. Until this time, the treatment for this type of breast cancer was oophorectomy.

Jordan returned to Leeds University as a lecturer in Pharmacology between 1974 and 1979, after which he spent one year at Ludwig Institute for Cancer Research at the University of Bern, Switzerland.

In 1980, Jordan joined the University of Wisconsin–Madison where he started to look at the effects of tamoxifen and another SERM, raloxifene, on bone density and coronary systems. This was needed because of the concern that long term use of SERMs could lead to osteoporosis and heart disease. Jordan's research showed that post-menopausal women who took these drugs did not suffer from a lowering of bone density or an increase in blood cholesterol. Raloxifene is now used in the prevention of osteoporosis. Jordan gained a full Professorship at Wisconsin in 1985, the same year his alma mater awarded him a DSc.

In 1993, Jordan became Professor of Cancer Pharmacology at Northwestern University Medical School in Chicago, IL., and director of the Breast Cancer Research Program at the Robert H. Lurie Comprehensive Cancer Center of Northwestern University. He was the inaugural holder of the Diana Princess of Wales Professor of Cancer Research (1999–2004).

He was appointed Officer of the Order of the British Empire (OBE) in the 2002 Birthday Honours for services to international breast cancer research.

In January 2005, Jordan was the inaugural Alfred G. Knudson Chair of Cancer Research at the Fox Chase Cancer Center in Philadelphia, PA. He has recently published work showing that estrogen, given at the right time, causes the destruction of cancer cells rather than feeding their growth. Jordan was the Scientific Director of the Lombardi Comprehensive Cancer Center, Professor of Oncology and Pharmacology, Vice Chair of the Department of Oncology, and the Vincent T. Lombardi Chair of Translational Cancer Research, Georgetown University, Washington, D.C., prior to moving to Texas.

Jordan was appointed Companion of the Order of St Michael and St George (CMG) in the 2019 Birthday Honours for services to women's health.

== Personal life and national service ==
Jordan was the father of two daughters, Helen Turner and Alexandra Noel. He had five grandchildren, Katherine, Lauren, Anna, Wilder and Elizabeth.

Military Service: Captain Intelligence Corps (V) (On the staff of the Deputy Chief Scientist (Army) UK (1971–75)), Attached NBC Officer Region 1 US Mobilization Designee, DEA Officers' Course and UK Police Narcotics Squad Training (1973–78), 23 Special Air Service (1975–79) (Commanding Officer Rory Walker (1975-1978)),(Commanding Officer Tony Hunter-Choat(1978-1979)), (Director SAS Group, Brigadier Johnny Watts (1975-1979)), RARO SAS (1979–97). SAS Regimental Association (2008–present).

Jordan died of kidney cancer at his home in Houston, on June 9, 2024, at the age of 76.

== Awards ==
2020 Honorary Doctor of Science degree from the University of Wisconsin–Madison

2019 Companion of the Order of St Michael and St George (CMG) for services to women's healthcare.

2012 Louis S. Goodman and Alfred Gilman Award in Receptor Pharmacology, American Society for Pharmacology and Experimental Therapeutics

2011 St. Gallen Prize for Clinical Breast Cancer Research, Switzerland

2008 David A. Karnofsky Award from the American Society of Clinical Oncology

2006 American Cancer Society Award and Lecture from the American Society for Clinical Oncology.

2003 Kettering Prize

2002 American Cancer Society Medal of Honor for basic research.

2002 made an Officer of the Order of the British Empire by Queen Elizabeth II for services to international breast cancer research.

2001 Umberto Veronesi Award for the Future Fight Against Breast Cancer (2001)

2001 Bristol-Myers Squibb Award for Distinguished Achievement in Cancer Research.

2001 Doctor of Medicine, honoris causa from the University of Leeds

1993 Cameron Prize for Therapeutics of the University of Edinburgh

1993 ASPET Award from the American Society of Pharmacology and Experimental Therapeutics.

1993 The Gaddum Memorial Award from the British Pharmacological Society

1992 Brinker International Breast Cancer Award for Basic Science from Susan G. Komen for the Cure.

== Books ==
- Tamoxifen-Pioneering Medicine in Breast Cancer by Philipp Y. Maximov, Russell E. McDaniel and V. Craig Jordan (2013). Milestones in Drug Therapy Series. Springer Basel AG, Basal, Switzerland.
- Estrogen Action, Selective Estrogen Receptor Modulators and Women’s Health: Progress and Promise edited by V. Craig Jordan (2013) Imperial College Press / World Scientific, London.

== Top cited publications ==
Total Citations as of January 11, 2021: 59,204 h-index score as of January 11, 2021: 122

- Cummings, S. R.; Eckert, S.; Krueger, K. A.; Grady, D.; Powles, T. J.; Cauley, J. A.; Norton, L.; Nickelsen, T.; Bjarnason, N. H.; Morrow, M.; Lippman, M. E.; Black, D.; Glusman, J. E.; Costa, A.; Jordan, V. C. (1999). "The effect of raloxifene on risk of breast cancer in postmenopausal women: Results from the MORE randomized trial. Multiple Outcomes of Raloxifene Evaluation". JAMA: The Journal of the American Medical Association. 281 (23): 2189–2197. doi:10.1001/jama.281.23.2189. PMID 10376571. (1,778 citations as of May 25, 2021).
- Furr, B. J.; Jordan, V. C. (1984). "The pharmacology and clinical uses of tamoxifen". Pharmacology & Therapeutics. 25 (2): 127–205. doi:10.1016/0163-7258(84)90043-3. PMID 6438654. (816 citations as of May 26, 2021).
- Love, R. R.; Mazess, R. B.; Barden, H. S.; Epstein, S.; Newcomb, P. A.; Jordan, V. C.; Carbone, P. P.; Demets, D. L. (1992). "Effects of Tamoxifen on Bone Mineral Density in Postmenopausal Women with Breast Cancer". New England Journal of Medicine. 326 (13): 852–856. doi:10.1056/NEJM199203263261302. PMID 1542321. (962 citations as of May 26, 2021).
- Vogel, V.G., Costantino, J.P., Wickerham, D.L., Cronin, W.M., Cecchini, R.S., Atkins, J.N., Bevers, T.B., Fehrenbacher, L., Pajon (jr), E.R., Wade, J.L. III, Robidoux, A., Margolese, R.G., James, J., Lippman, S.M., Runowicz, C.D., Ganz, P.A., Reis, S.E., McCaskill-Stevens, W., Ford, L.G., Jordan, V.C. and Wolmark, N. Effects of tamoxifen vs raloxifene on the risk of developing invasive breast cancer and other disease outcomes: the NSABP Study of Tamoxifen and Raloxifene (STAR) P-2 trial" Journal of the American Medical Association 295:2727-41, 2006. (1,323 citations as of May 26, 2021).
- MacGregor, J. I.; Jordan, V. C. (1998). "Basic guide to the mechanisms of antiestrogen action". Pharmacological Reviews. 50 (2): 151–196. doi:10.1016/S0031-6997(24)01358-9. PMID 9647865. (662 citations as of May 26, 2021).
- Jordan, V. C. (1984). "Biochemical pharmacology of antiestrogen action". Pharmacological Reviews. 36 (4): 245–276. doi:10.1016/S0031-6997(25)06650-5. PMID 6395141. (407 citations as of May 26, 2021).
- Jordan, V.C., Collins, M.M., Rowsby L. and Prestwich, G. A monohydroxylated metabolite of tamoxifen with potent antioestrogenic activity. Journal of Endocrinology 75:305-316, 1977. (441 citations as of May 26, 2021).
- Jordan, V.C. and Murphy, C. S. Endocrine pharmacology of antiestrogens as antitumor agents. Endocrine Reviews 11:578-610, 1990. (494 citations as of May 26, 2021).
- Cauley, J. A., Norton, L., Lippman, M. E., Eckert, S., Krueger, K. A., Purdie, D. W., Farrerons, J., Karasik, A., Mellstrom, D., Ng, K. W., Stepan, J. J., Powles, T. J., Morrow, M., Costa, A., Silfen, S. L., Walls, E. L., Schmitt, H., Muchmore, D. B. and Jordan, V. C. Continued breast cancer risk reduction in postmenopausal women treated with raloxifene: 4-year results from the MORE trial. Breast Cancer Research and Treatment 65: 125–134, 2001. (623 citations as of May 26, 2021).
- Lerner, L.J. and Jordan, V.C. Development of antiestrogens and their use in breast cancer (Eighth Cain Memorial award lecture)" Cancer Research 50:4177-4189, 1990. (421 citations as of May 26, 2021).
- Gottardis, M.M., Robinson, S. P., Satyaswaroop, P.G. and Jordan, V.C. Contrasting actions of tamoxifen on endometrial and breast tumor growth in the athymic mouse" Cancer Research 48:812-815, 1988. (389 citations as of May 26, 2021).
- Gottardis, M.M. and Jordan, V.C. Development of tamoxifen-stimulated growth of MCF 7 tumors in athymic mice after long-term antiestrogen administration" Cancer Research 48:5183-5187, 1988. (386 citations as of May 26, 2021).
- Jordan, V.C. Effect of tamoxifen (ICI 46,474) on initiation and growth of DMBA-induced rat mammary carcinomata. European Journal of Cancer 12:419-424, 1976. (337 citations as of May 26, 2021).
- Love, R.R., Wiebe, D. A., Newcomb, P.A., Cameron, L., Leventhal, H., Jordan, V.C., Feyzi, J. and DeMets, D. L. Effects of tamoxifen on cardiovascular risk factors in postmenopausal women" Annals of Internal Medicine 115:860-864, 1991. (327 citations as of May 26, 2021).
- Gottardis, M. M. and Jordan, V.C. The antitumor actions of keoxifene (raloxifene) and tamoxifen in the N nitrosomethylurea-induced rat mammary carcinoma model" Cancer Research 47:4020-4024, 1987. (313 citations as of May 26, 2021).
- Love, R.R., Newcomb, P.A., Wiebe, D. A., Surawicz, T.S., Jordan, V.C., Carbone, P.P. and DeMets, D.L. Effects of tamoxifen therapy on lipid and lipoprotein levels in postmenopausal patients with node-negative breast cancer. Journal of National Cancer Institute 82:1327 1331, 1990. (282 citations as of May 26, 2021).
- Jordan, V.C., Phelps, E. and Lindgren J.U. Effects of antiestrogens on bone in castrated and intact female rats. Breast Cancer Research and Treatment 10:31-35, 1987. (276 citations as of May 26, 2021).
- Jiang, S.Y. and Jordan, V.C. Growth regulation of estrogen receptor negative breast cancer cells transfected with cDNA's for estrogen receptor" Journal of the National Cancer Institute 84:580-591, 1992. (241 citations as of May 26, 2021).
- Jordan, V.C. Antiestrogens and selective estrogen receptor modulators as multifunctional medicines. Part I: Receptor interactions" Journal of Medicinal Chemistry 46:883-908, 2003. (369 citations as of May 26, 2021).
- Jordan, V.C. Antiestrogens and selective estrogen receptor modulators as multifunctional medicines. Part II: Clinical considerations and new agents" Journal of Medicinal Chemistry 46:1081-1111, 2003. (250 citations as of May 26, 2021).
- Gottardis, M.M., Jiang, S.Y., Jeng, M.H. and Jordan, V.C. Inhibition of tamoxifen-stimulated growth of an MCF-7 tumor variant in athymic mice by novel steroidal antiestrogens" Cancer Research 49:4090-4093, 1989. (233 citations as of May 26, 2021).
- Pink, J.J. and Jordan, V.C. Models of estrogen receptor regulation by estrogens and antiestrogens in breast cancer cell lines" Cancer Research 56:2321-2330, 1996. (244 citations as of May 26, 2021).
- Trump, D.L., Smith, D.C., Ellis, P.G., Rogers, M.P., Schold, S.C., Winer, E.P., Ponella, T.J., Jordan, V.C. and Fine, R.L. High dose oral tamoxifen, a potential multidrug resistance reversal agent: Phase I trial in combination with vinblastine" Journal of the National Cancer Institute 84:1811-1816, 1992. (210 citations as of May 26, 2021).
- Jordan, V.C. A current view of tamoxifen for the treatment and prevention of breast cancer (Gaddum Memorial Lecture)" British Journal of Pharmacology 110:507-517, 1993. (257 citations as of May 26, 2021).
- Jordan, V.C. and Morrow, M.M. Tamoxifen, raloxifene and the prevention of breast cancer. Endocrine Reviews 20:253-278, 1999. (113 citations as of May 26, 2021).
- Jordan, V.C. Tamoxifen: a most unlikely pioneering medicine. Nature Reviews Drug Discovery 2:205-213, 2003. (493 citations as of May 26, 2021).
- Jordan, V.C. and Allen, K.E. Evaluation of the antitumour activity of the nonsteroidal antioestrogen monohydroxytamoxifen in the DMBA-induced rat mammary carcinoma model. European Journal of Cancer 16:239-251, 1980. (199 citations as of May 26, 2021).
- Jensen, E.V. and Jordan, V.C. The estrogen receptor: a model for molecular medicine" Clinical Cancer Research 9:1980-1989, 2003. (347 citations as of May 26, 2021).
- Robinson, S.P., Langan-Fahey, S.M., Johnson, D.A. and Jordan, V.C. Metabolites, pharmacodynamics and pharmacokinetics of tamoxifen in rats and mice compared to the breast cancer patient. Drug Metabolism and Disposition 19:36-43, 1991. (230 citations as of May 26, 2021).
- Jordan, V.C. Selective estrogen receptor modulation: concept and consequences in cancer" Cancer Cell 5:207-213, 2004. (256 citations as of May 26, 2021).
