= Traumatic anserine folliculosis =

- Specialty: Dermatology

Traumatic anserine folliculosis is a curious gooseflesh-like follicular hyperkeratosis that may result from persistent pressure and lateral friction of one skin surface against another. Traumatic anserine folliculosis is caused by trauma. Topical keratolytics are the treatment of choice.

== Signs and symptoms ==
Traumatic anserine folliculosis is defined by several closely spaced, clustered follicular papules. The most frequently affected areas are the neck, jaws, and chin.

== Causes ==
Traumatic anserine folliculosis is caused by trauma.

== Diagnosis ==
Histopathological features include the possibility of hypergranulosis, hyperkeratosis, localized lucidum presence or increase, rudimentary follicles, and follicular opening dilatation with retention of keratotic material. There could be a little perivascular lymphocytic infiltration.

Disseminate and recurrent infundibular folliculitis, keratosis pilaris, lichen spinulosus, trichostasis spinulosa, and trichodysplasia spinulosa are among the conditions included in the differential diagnosis of traumatic anserine folliculosis.

== Treatment ==
Topical keratolytics are among the treatment options.

== See also ==
- List of cutaneous conditions
