= N-Desmethyltamoxifen =

Chemical compound

Clinical data
- Other names: ICI-55,548; Nortamoxifen; NDMTAM
- Drug class: Selective estrogen receptor modulator

Identifiers
- IUPAC name: 2-[4-[(Z)-1,2-Diphenylbut-1-enyl]phenoxy]-N-methylethanamine
- CAS Number: 31750-48-8
- PubChem CID: 6378383
- ChemSpider: 2297759
- UNII: OOJ759O35C
- KEGG: C16546
- ChEBI: CHEBI:80554
- CompTox Dashboard (EPA): DTXSID501315924
- ECHA InfoCard: 100.170.899

Chemical and physical data
- Formula: C_{25}H_{27}NO
- Molar mass: 357.497 g·mol^{−1}
- 3D model (JSmol): Interactive image
- SMILES: CC/C(=C(\C1=CC=CC=C1)/C2=CC=C(C=C2)OCCNC)/C3=CC=CC=C3
- InChI: InChI=1S/C25H27NO/c1-3-24(20-10-6-4-7-11-20)25(21-12-8-5-9-13-21)22-14-16-23(17-15-22)27-19-18-26-2/h4-17,26H,3,18-19H2,1-2H3/b25-24-; Key:NYDCDZSEEAUOHN-IZHYLOQSSA-N

N-Desmethyltamoxifen (developmental code name ICI-55,548) is a major metabolite of tamoxifen, a selective estrogen receptor modulator (SERM). N-Desmethyltamoxifen is further metabolized into endoxifen (4-hydroxy-N-desmethyltamoxifen), which is thought to be the major active form of tamoxifen in the body. In one study, N-desmethyltamoxifen had an affinity for the estrogen receptor of 2.4% relative to estradiol. For comparison, tamoxifen, endoxifen, and afimoxifene (4-hydroxytamoxifen) had relative binding affinities of 2.8%, 181%, and 181%, respectively.
