= Pizza Wars Imperium =

Wargame

Pizza Wars Imperium is a set of rules published by Heathen Thorn Enterprises in 1988 for a wargame played on top of a pizza.

== Description ==
In 1988, Horde Publications published the rules for Pizza Wars, a wargame for two players designed by James LaFond that was played on top of a pizza. Later the same year, Heathen Thorn Enterprises released an expanded version for 2–7 players titled Pizza Wars Imperium, with artwork by Paul Baker and Richard Thomas. In both games, players fight a wargame where the toppings on a pizza represent the combatants. Qualitygame published an Italian edition with cover art by Paolo Parrucci.

=== Gameplay ===
In order to play, 2–7 players collectively order a pizza, each player choosing a different topping. When the pizza arrives, each player takes turns having a group of their toppings attack another group of toppings. Combat is resolved as the number of pieces of attacking topping pieces plus a six-sided die roll versus the number of defending pieces, the higher number winning. The player who wins the combat eats the other group of toppings. The last player to have toppings left is the winner of the game.

== Reception ==
Stewart Wieck reviewed Pizza Wars Imperium for White Wolf #14, rating it 3 out of 5 overall, and stated that "The booklet is very attractively illustrated by Richard Thomas and the wacky idea is actually pulled off reasonably well by designer James LaFond. Now there's no need to take a break to eat: just keep on gaming!"
