= Traumatic alopecia =

- Specialty: Dermatology

Traumatic alopecia is a cutaneous condition that results from the forceful pulling out of the scalp hair.

== See also ==
- Traction alopecia
- List of cutaneous conditions
