= Endoxifen =

Chemical compound

Clinical data
- Trade names: Zonalta
- Other names: 4-Hydroxy-N-desmethyltamoxifen; Desmethylhydroxytamoxifen
- Routes of administration: By mouth

Identifiers
- IUPAC name: 4-[1-[4-[2-(methylamino)ethoxy]phenyl]-2-phenylbut-1-enyl]phenol
- CAS Number: 112093-28-4 114828-90-9 (E-isomer) 1032008-74-4 (hydrochloride)
- PubChem CID: 130621
- IUPHAR/BPS: 10203
- ChemSpider: 23935851
- UNII: 46AF8680RC
- KEGG: C16547
- ChEBI: CHEBI:80555
- ChEMBL: ChEMBL1949791
- PDB ligand: 9XY (PDBe, RCSB PDB)
- CompTox Dashboard (EPA): DTXSID80149880
- ECHA InfoCard: 100.208.548

Chemical and physical data
- Formula: C_{25}H_{27}NO_{2}
- Molar mass: 373.496 g·mol^{−1}
- 3D model (JSmol): Interactive image
- SMILES: CCC(=C(C1=CC=C(C=C1)O)C2=CC=C(C=C2)OCCNC)C3=CC=CC=C3
- InChI: InChI=1S/C25H27NO2/c1-3-24(19-7-5-4-6-8-19)25(20-9-13-22(27)14-10-20)21-11-15-23(16-12-21)28-18-17-26-2/h4-16,26-27H,3,17-18H2,1-2H3; Key:MHJBZVSGOZTKRH-UHFFFAOYSA-N

Endoxifen, also known as 4-hydroxy-N-desmethyltamoxifen, is a nonsteroidal selective estrogen receptor modulator (SERM) and a protein kinase C (PKC) inhibitor of the triphenylethylene group. It is under development for the treatment of estrogen receptor-positive breast cancer and for the treatment of mania in bipolar disorder. It is taken by mouth.

Endoxifen is an active metabolite of tamoxifen and has been found to be effective in patients that have failed previous hormonal therapies (tamoxifen, aromatase inhibitors, and fulvestrant). The prodrug tamoxifen is metabolized by the CYP2D6 enzyme to produce endoxifen and afimoxifene (4-hydroxytamoxifen).

Since 2019, endoxifen is approved by Drugs Controller General of India for the acute treatment of manic episode with or without mixed features of Bipolar I disorder. It is manufactured and sold by Intas Pharmaceuticals under the brand name Zonalta.

== Medical uses ==
=== Bipolar disorder ===
Endoxifen is used to treat manic or mixed episodes associated with bipolar I disorder in India. It has been found that the endoxifen improves manic symptoms as well as mixed episode symptoms of patients with bipolar I disorder and has been considered an effective and well-tolerated treatment for this condition.

Bipolar disorder is associated with overactive protein kinase C (PKC) intracellular signaling. To date, there have been three phases of clinical trials. And, in the phase III trials, endoxifen reduced the total Young Mania Rating Scale (YMRS) score from 33.1 to 17.8. A significant (p < 0.001) improvement in Montgomery–Åsberg Depression Rating Scale (MADRS) score was observed for endoxifen (4.8 to 2.5). The endoxifen is well-tolerated by the subjects as depicted in the changes in Clinical Global Impression-Severity of Illness scores.

== Side effects ==
The most prevalent side effects for endoxifen include headache, vomiting, insomnia. Other side effects were: gastritis, epigastric discomfort, diarrhea, restlessness, somnolence, etc. Some of the adverse events reported with other therapies for the management of manic episodes of bipolar I disorder were not observed during the clinical development program of endoxifen like reduction in platelet count, change in blood thyroid-stimulating hormone levels. There were no deaths, serious or significant adverse events during the conduct of trials. Overall, endoxifen was found to be well-tolerated and safe in patients of bipolar I disorder with acute manic episodes with or without mixed features. An important caveat here is that the trial was of very short duration (only three weeks). The long-term safety of Endoxifen has not been established among patients with Bipolar Disorder.

== Pharmacology ==
=== Pharmacodynamics ===
==== Selective estrogen receptor modulator ====
Endoxifen is a selective estrogen receptor modulator (SERM) with estrogenic and antiestrogenic actions. In the first study to evaluate the pharmacology of endoxifen, it showed 25% of the affinity of estradiol for the estrogen receptor (ER) while afimoxifene had 35% of the affinity of estradiol for the ER. The antiestrogenic actions of endoxifen and afimoxifene in this study were very similar. In another study, the affinity of endoxifen for the ERα was 12.1% and its affinity for the ERβ was 4.75% relative to estradiol. For comparison, afimoxifene had relative binding affinities for the ERα and ERβ of 19.0% and 21.5% compared to estradiol, respectively. In yet another investigation, both endoxifen and afimoxifene had 181% of the affinity of estradiol for the ER whereas tamoxifen had 2.8% and N-desmethyltamoxifen had 2.4%.

==== Protein kinase C inhibition ====
The exact mechanism by which endoxifen exerts its therapeutic effects has not been established in bipolar I disorder. However, the efficacy of endoxifen could be mediated through protein kinase C (PKC). The PKC represents a family of enzymes highly enriched in the brain, where it plays a major role in regulating both pre-and post-synaptic aspects of neurotransmission. Excessive activation of PKC results in symptoms related to bipolar disorder. The PKC signaling pathway is a target for the actions of two structurally dissimilar antimanic agents – lithium and valproate.

Endoxifen exhibits 4-fold higher potency in inhibiting PKC activity compared to tamoxifen in preclinical studies and is not dependent on the isozyme cytochrome P450 2D6 (CYP2D6) for action on the target tissues.

=== Pharmacokinetics ===
Orally administered endoxifen is rapidly absorbed and systemically available. The time to peak (Tmax) is between 4.5 and 6 hours after oral administration. It is not metabolized by cytochrome P450 enzymes. The half-life (t½) life of endoxifen is 52.1 to 58.1 hours.

== Research ==
Endoxifen has been investigated as a potential drug in the treatment of breast cancer.

== See also ==
- List of investigational bipolar disorder drugs
