= Empires & Dynasties =

French tabletop role-playing game

Empires & Dynasties is a 1988 role-playing game published by Dragon Radieux.

== Gameplay ==
Empires & Dynasties is a game in which a boxed set includes two rulebooks covering the world of Reah, magic, religion, technology, bestiary, and an introductory adventure scenario, along with a gamemaster's screen and a large world map.

== Reviews ==
- Casus Belli #45
- Casus Belli #46
- Jeux & Stratégie #52
