= Candy Land =

Board game

- Cover of the original 1949 edition
- Designers: Eleanor Abbott
- Publishers: Milton Bradley; Hasbro
- Publication: 1949; 77 years ago
- Years active: 1949–present
- Genres: Board game
- Languages: English
- Players: 2–4
- Playing time: 30'
- Chance: Complete
- Age range: 3+

Candy Land is a simple racing board game created by Eleanor Abbott and published by Milton Bradley in 1949. The game requires no reading and minimal counting skills, making it suitable for young children. No strategy is involved as players are never required to make choices; only following directions is required. Over 50 million copies of Candy Land have been sold.

== History ==
The game was designed in 1948 by Eleanor Abbott, a primary school teacher in her 30s who was recovering from polio in a San Diego, California area hospital. She created it for the children who were in her ward in the hospital and later submitted the game to Milton Bradley Company. The game was bought by Milton Bradley and first published in 1949 as a temporary fill-in for their then-main product line, school supplies. Candy Land became Milton Bradley's best-selling game, surpassing its previous top seller, Uncle Wiggily, and put the company in the same league as its main competitor, Parker Brothers. The original art has been purported to be by Abbott, although this is uncertain.

In 1984, Hasbro purchased Milton Bradley. Landmark Entertainment Group revamped the game with new art that same year, adding characters and a storyline. Hasbro produces several versions of the game and treats it as a brand. For example, it markets Candy Land puzzles, a travel version, a personal computer game, and a handheld electronic version.

Candy Land was involved in one of the first disputes over Internet domain names in 1996. An adult web content provider registered candyland.com, and Hasbro objected. Hasbro obtained an injunction against the use. In 2012, Hasbro announced a film, which triggered a lawsuit by Landmark Entertainment Group over ownership and royalties owed for the characters and storyline introduced in the 1984 edition. There was previously a direct-to-video film in 2005, called Candy Land: The Great Lollipop Adventure.

== Gameplay ==
The race is woven around a storyline about finding King Kandy, the lost king of Candy Land. The board consists of a winding, linear track made of 134 spaces, most red, green, blue, yellow, orange, or purple. The remaining pink spaces are named locations, such as Candy Cane Forest and Gumdrop Mountain, or characters, such as Queen Frostine and Gramma Nutt.

Players take turns removing the top card from a stack, most of which show one of six colors, and then moving their marker ahead to the next space of that color. Some cards have two marks of a color, in which case the player moves the marker ahead to the second-next space of that color. The deck has one card for each named location, and drawing such a card moves a player directly to that board location. This move can be either forward or backward in the classic game. Backward moves can be ignored for younger players in the 2004 version of the game.

Prior to the 2006 edition, the board had three colored spaces marked with a dot. A player who lands on such a space must remain there and continue to draw one card per turn, but may not move ahead until they draw a card with the same color as that space. In the 2006 version, dot spaces were replaced with licorice spaces that cause the player landing on it simply to lose the next turn. Two shortcut paths are marked on the board; if a player lands on the space at the start of a shortcut, they may move directly to its end.

The game is won by landing on or passing the final square and thus reaching the goal of the Candy Castle. In the original version, that final square is purple, but the official rules specify that any card that would cause the player to advance past the last square wins the game. Many people, however, play with a rule that one must land exactly on the last square to win. The 2004 version changed the last space to rainbow color, meaning it applies to any color drawn by a player, which renders the rule superfluous.

In 2013, Candy Land was redesigned to have a spinner instead of cards, where the spinner included all outcomes that were previously on the cards. This change only lasted one year before the game reverted back to cards. As of 2025, the game uses cards to direct players' movements.

== Adaptations ==
The Candy section of Toys "R" Us in New York City's Times Square maintained a Candy Land theme until losing its license for the characters in 2006. The theme included a colored pathway that mimicked the board for the game, several Candy Land characters, and candy-themed shelving and ceiling decorations.

An animated feature, Candy Land: The Great Lollipop Adventure, was released in 2005.

In February 2009, Universal Pictures announced plans for a film based on the Candy Land board game: Etan Cohen was hired to write the screenplay, and Kevin Lima was set to direct. In 2011, screenwriting was taken over by Jonathan Aibel and Glenn Berger, who compared their approach to The Lord of the Rings. By January 2012, the project had moved to Columbia Pictures, with Adam Sandler's Happy Madison in final negotiations to develop the film; Sandler would both star and co-write the screenplay with Robert Smigel. In July 2014, a lawsuit by Landmark Entertainment Group took place over ownership and royalties owned for the characters and storyline introduced in the 1984 edition, halting pre-production on the film.

Candy Land was one of several Hasbro properties featured in the 2011 one-shot comic book Unit: E, which attempted to revamp and tie together several of Hasbro's dormant properties. Princess Lolly is seen in one page, with Synergy (from Jem), the son of Acroyear and his servant Biotron (both from Micronauts) discussing her and other fairies that have crossed over from their land onto Earth more than once. Synergy believes the creatures of Primordia (an attempted reworking of Inhumanoids) may have been the result of someone angering the fairies in the past, though she admits she's uncertain if this is in fact the case.

A cooking competition show, which was based on the game and hosted by Kristin Chenoweth, premiered on Food Network on November 15, 2020. Teams of dessert chefs competed over six weeks for a $25,000 grand prize.

== Reception ==
The Toy Industry Association named Candy Land as the most popular toy in the US in the 1940s. In 2005, the game was inducted into the National Toy Hall of Fame at The Strong Museum in Rochester, New York. About one million copies per year are sold.
