= Eleanor Abbott =

Canadian and American game designer (1910-1988)

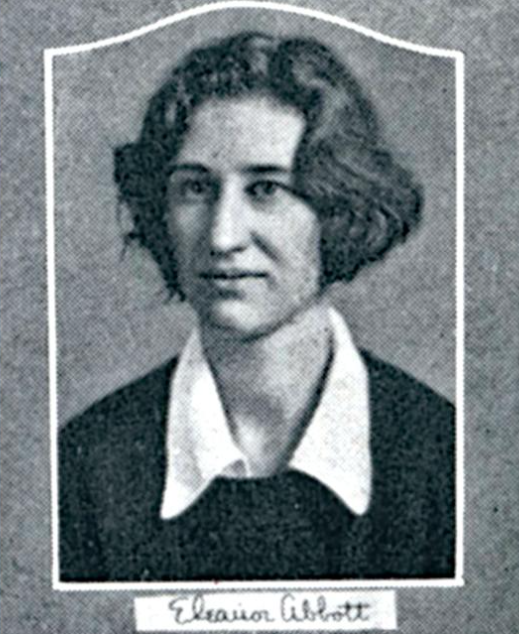
- Abbott in her high school yearbook
- Born: September 9, 1910; Ontario, Canada
- Died: December 10, 1988 (aged 78); San Diego, California, US
- Occupation: Game designer

Eleanor Abbott (September 9, 1910 – December 10, 1988) was a Canadian and American game designer. She is best known for creating the board game Candy Land for children in a polio ward. She went on to sell the game to Milton Bradley.

== Biography ==
Abbott was born on September 9, 1910, in Ontario, Canada, to a father who was a watch repairman. She arrived in Port Huron, Michigan with her family in 1919 and subsequently lived in San Luis Obispo and Oakland before settling in Monrovia, where she graduated high school. During this period, she took part in parties, teas, and themed clubs, and began writing short stories. She also learned watch repair from her father. She had also worked as a schoolteacher.

She went on to live in San Diego, where she worked in watch repair and lived with her sister Betty Ann. She contracted polio during the 1948 polio epidemic.

During her time in the ward, she saw children in the polio ward and decided to create a game for them. The game featured colored squares so didn't require counting or reading. It also didn't require strategy.

After drawing it out on butcher paper, she brought it to the children and dubbed it Candy Land. She subsequently sold the game to Milton Bradley, where an executive described her as "a real sweetheart", and donated much of her royalties to schools in San Diego and children with polio.

Despite the money she had gained from the game, she continued working as a gardener, a babysitter, and a rare coin dealer, describing herself as a "woman do-it-yourselfer". She also did repair and painting work. She attempted to design additional games, but none caught on. She also enjoyed shooting and driving fast cars, of which she owned two, a purple Willys Jeep and a 1972 Mercedes.

Her sister died in 1987, and she subsequently died by suicide in 1988. She willed the money to friends, family, and Christian organizations.

== Legacy ==
The 1999 copy of Candy Land mentioned her on it. Her personal life was little-known until journalists at the New York Times began investigating in 2020.
