= Tamoxifen =

Selective estrogen receptor modulator

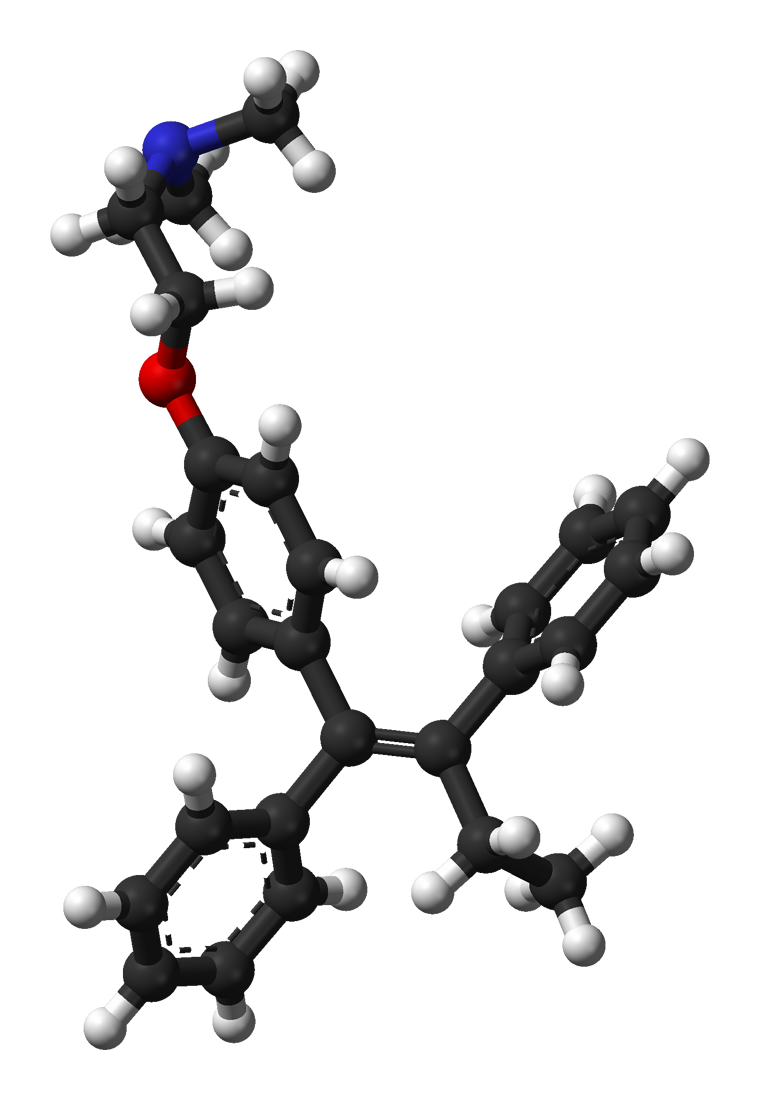

Clinical data
- Trade names: Nolvadex, others
- Other names: TMX; ICI-46474
- AHFS/Drugs.com: Monograph
- MedlinePlus: a682414
- License data: US DailyMed: Tamoxifen
- Pregnancy category: AU: B3
- Routes of administration: By mouth
- Drug class: Selective estrogen receptor modulator
- ATC code: L02BA01 (WHO)

Legal status
- Legal status: AU: S4 (Prescription only); CA: ℞-only; UK: POM (Prescription only); US: ℞-only

Pharmacokinetic data
- Bioavailability: ~100%
- Protein binding: >99% (albumin)
- Metabolism: Liver (CYP3A4, CYP2C9, CYP2D6)
- Metabolites: • N-Desmethyltamoxifen • Endoxifen (4-hydroxy-N-desmethyltamoxifen) • Afimoxifene (4-hydroxytamoxifen) • N,N-Didesmethyltamoxifen • Norendoxifen (4-hydroxy-N,N-didesmethyltamoxifen) • Others, conjugates
- Elimination half-life: 5–7 days
- Excretion: Feces: 65% Urine: 9%

Identifiers
- IUPAC name: (Z)-2-[4-(1,2-Diphenylbut-1-enyl)phenoxy]-N,N-dimethylethanamine
- CAS Number: 10540-29-1; citrate: 54965-24-1
- PubChem CID: 2733526; citrate: 2733525
- IUPHAR/BPS: 1016
- DrugBank: DB00675; citrate: DBSALT000168
- ChemSpider: 2015313; citrate: 2015312
- UNII: 094ZI81Y45; citrate: 7FRV7310N6
- KEGG: D08559; citrate: D00966
- ChEBI: CHEBI:41774; citrate: CHEBI:9397
- ChEMBL: ChEMBL83; citrate: ChEMBL786
- PDB ligand: CTX (PDBe, RCSB PDB)
- CompTox Dashboard (EPA): DTXSID1034187
- ECHA InfoCard: 100.031.004

Chemical and physical data
- Formula: C_{26}H_{29}NO
- Molar mass: 371.524 g·mol^{−1}
- 3D model (JSmol): Interactive image
- SMILES: CN(C)CCOc1ccc(cc1)/C(c2ccccc2)=C(/CC)c3ccccc3
- InChI: InChI=1S/C26H29NO/c1-4-25(21-11-7-5-8-12-21)26(22-13-9-6-10-14-22)23-15-17-24(18-16-23)28-20-19-27(2)3/h5-18H,4,19-20H2,1-3H3/b26-25-; Key:NKANXQFJJICGDU-QPLCGJKRSA-N

Tamoxifen, marketed under the brand name Nolvadex (among others), is a selective estrogen receptor modulator sometimes used in breast cancer drug regimens for women and men. It is also being studied for other types of cancer. It has been used for Albright syndrome. Tamoxifen is usually administered orally for five years for breast cancer.

Serious side effects of tamoxifen can include increased risk of uterine cancer, stroke, ophthalmological problems, and pulmonary embolisms. Common side effects include irregular periods, weight loss, and hot flashes. It may cause harm to a foetus if taken during pregnancy or breastfeeding.

Tamoxifen is a selective estrogen-receptor modulator (SERM) and works by decreasing the growth of breast cancer cells. It is a member of the triphenylethylene group of compounds.

Tamoxifen was first sythesized in 1962 by chemist Dora Richardson. It is on the World Health Organization's List of Essential Medicines. Tamoxifen is available as a generic medication. In 2020, it was the 317th most commonly prescribed medication in the United States, with more than 900 thousand prescriptions.

== Medical uses ==
=== Breast cancer ===
Tamoxifen is used for the treatment of both early and advanced estrogen receptor-positive (ER-positive or ER+) breast cancer in pre- and postmenopausal women. Tamoxifen increases the risk of postmenopausal bleeding, endometrial polyps, hyperplasia, and endometrial cancer; using tamoxifen with an intrauterine system releasing levonorgestrel might increase vaginal bleeding after 1 to 2 years, but reduces somewhat endometrial polyps and hyperplasia, but not necessarily endometrial cancer. Additionally, it is the most common hormone treatment for male breast cancer. It is also approved by the FDA for the prevention of breast cancer in women at high risk of developing the disease. The effectiveness of tamoxifen is primarily influenced by estrogen receptor (ER) status, which was the key predictor of the proportional benefits observed. It has been further approved for the reduction of contralateral (in the opposite breast) cancer. Five years of adjuvant tamoxifen treatment significantly lowers the 15-year risk of breast cancer recurrence and mortality. The overall use of tamoxifen is recommended for 10 years.

In 2006, the large STAR clinical study concluded that raloxifene is also effective in reducing the incidence of breast cancer. Updated results after an average of 6.75 years of follow up found that raloxifene retains 76% of tamoxifen's effectiveness in preventing invasive breast cancer, with 45% fewer uterine cancers and 25% fewer blood clots in women taking raloxifene than in women taking tamoxifen.

=== Infertility ===
Tamoxifen is used for ovulation induction to treat infertility in women with anovulatory disorders. It is given at days three to seven of a woman's cycle.

Tamoxifen improves fertility in males with infertility by disinhibiting the hypothalamic–pituitary–gonadal axis (HPG axis) via ER antagonism and thereby increasing the secretion of luteinizing hormone (LH) and follicle-stimulating hormone (FSH) and increasing testicular testosterone production. Some animal studies have suggested tamoxifen could have negative effects on sperm quality and prostatic and gonadal health.

=== Dysmenorrhea ===
Dysmenorrhea is the term for menstrual pain, usually centered in the lower abdomen but often spreading to the back and inner thighs. It is a common gynecological condition that can seriously affect daily activities and well-being. Tamoxifen has been identified and used to effectively improve blood flow, reduce uterine contractility and pain in dysmenorrhea patients.

=== Gynecomastia ===
Benign enlargement of the male breast, whether asymptomatic or painful, is a common condition thought to result from an increased estrogen/testosterone ratio or from heightened estrogenic or reduced androgenic activity via receptor interactions.Tamoxifen is used to prevent and treat gynecomastia. It is taken as a preventative measure in small doses, or used at the onset of any symptoms such as nipple soreness or sensitivity. Current treatments typically involve pain relief through medication or surgery. However, targeting the underlying estrogenic stimulation may offer a more specific therapeutic approach. In a double-blind crossover study, patients were given either a placebo or tamoxifen (10 mg orally twice daily) for one month, in random order. Seven out of ten patients saw a reduction in gynecomastia size with tamoxifen (P < 0.005), and the overall reduction for the group was statistically significant (P < 0.01). No benefits were observed with the placebo (P > 0.1). Additionally, all four patients with painful gynecomastia experienced relief of their symptoms, and no toxicity was noted. Although the breast size reduction was partial, this suggests that longer treatment may be necessary. Follow-up examinations conducted 9 to 12 months after treatment revealed no significant changes, except in two cases: one tamoxifen responder had a recurrence of breast tenderness after six months, and one non-responder developed increased breast size and new tenderness after ten months. Other medications are taken for similar purposes such as clomifene and aromatase inhibitor drugs; which are used in order to try to avoid the hormone-related adverse effects. Overall, tamoxifen appears to be a safe and effective treatment option for selected cases of gynecomastia.

Tamoxifen doses and rates of bicalutamide-induced breast symptoms in men
| Follow-up timepoint | Tamoxifen dosage | | | | | |
| Follow-up timepoint | Placebo | 1 mg/day | 2.5 mg/day | 5 mg/day | 10 mg/day | 20 mg/day |
|---|---|---|---|---|---|---|
| 0 months | – | | | | | |
| 6 months | 98% | 90% | 80% | 54% | 22% | 10% |
| 12 months | 99% | 95% | 84% | 56% | 38% | 19% |
Notes: Prevention of breast symptoms—specifically gynecomastia and breast pain—induced by 150 mg/day bicalutamide monotherapy with tamoxifen in 282 men with prostate cancer. Bicalutamide and tamoxifen were initiated at the same time (0 months). Estradiol levels were in the range of about 22 to 47 pg/mL in the treated group. Sources:

=== Early puberty ===
Tamoxifen is useful in the treatment of peripheral precocious puberty, for instance due to McCune–Albright syndrome, in both girls and boys. It has been found to decrease growth velocity and the rate of bone maturation in girls with precocious puberty, and hence to limit height in these individuals.

=== Available forms ===
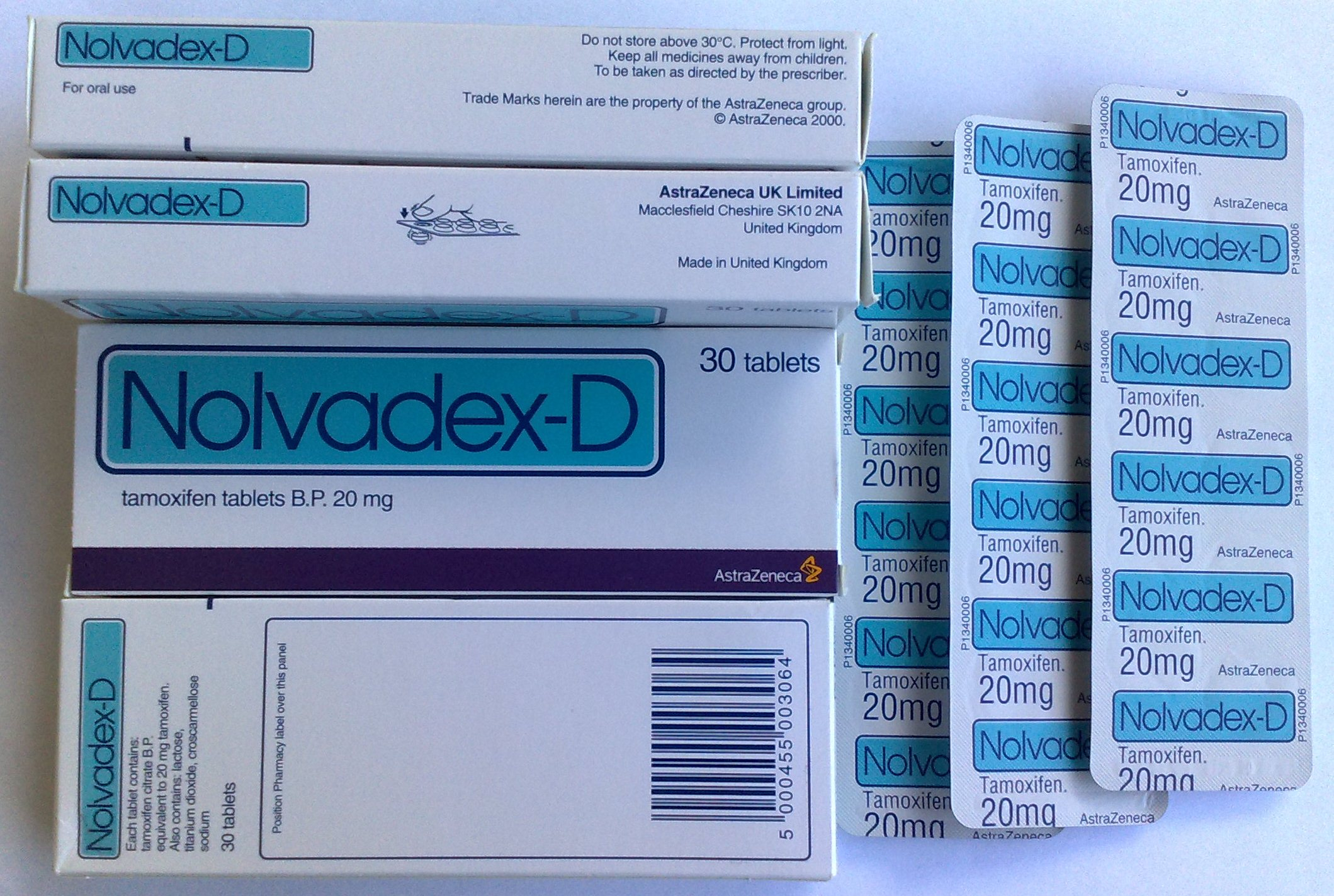
Nolvadex (tamoxifen) 20 mg tablets

Tamoxifen is available as a tablet or oral solution.

== Contraindications ==
Tamoxifen has a number of contraindications, including known hypersensitivity to tamoxifen or other ingredients, individuals taking concomitant coumarin-type anticoagulant therapy, and women with a history of venous thromboembolism (deep vein thrombosis or pulmonary embolism).

== Side effects ==
A report in September 2009 from Health and Human Services' Agency for Healthcare Research and Quality suggests that tamoxifen, raloxifene, and tibolone used to treat breast cancer significantly reduce invasive breast cancer in midlife and older women, but also increase the risk of adverse side effects.

=== Endometrial cancer ===
Tamoxifen is a selective estrogen receptor modulator (SERM). Even though it is an antagonist in breast tissue it acts as partial agonist on the endometrium and has been linked to endometrial cancer in some women. Therefore, endometrial changes, including cancer, are among tamoxifen's side effects. With time, risk of endometrial cancer may be doubled to quadrupled, which is a reason tamoxifen is typically only used for five years. Research suggests that tamoxifen may activate PI3K signaling in uterine tissue as a non-genetic driver event, which could contribute to uterine carcinogenesis.

The American Cancer Society lists tamoxifen as a known carcinogen, stating that it increases the risk of some types of uterine cancer while lowering the risk of breast cancer recurrence.

=== Cardiovascular and metabolic ===
Tamoxifen treatment of postmenopausal women is associated with beneficial effects on serum lipid profiles. However, long-term data from clinical trials have failed to demonstrate a cardioprotective effect. For some women, tamoxifen can cause a rapid increase in triglyceride concentration in the blood. In addition, there is an increased risk of thromboembolism especially during and immediately after major surgery or periods of immobility. Use of tamoxifen has been shown to slightly increase risk of deep vein thrombosis, pulmonary embolism, and stroke.

=== Liver toxicity ===
Tamoxifen has been associated with a number of cases of hepatotoxicity. Several different varieties of hepatotoxicity have been reported. Tamoxifen can also precipitate non-alcoholic fatty liver disease in obese and overweight women (not in normal weight women) at an average rate of 40% after a year use with 20 mg/day.

== Overdose ==
Acute overdose of tamoxifen has not been reported in humans. In dose-ranging studies, tamoxifen was administered at very high doses in women (e.g., 300 mg/m^{2}) and was found to produce acute neurotoxicity including tremor, hyperreflexia, unsteady gait, and dizziness. These symptoms occurred within three to five days of therapy and disappeared within two to five days of discontinuation of therapy. No indications of permanent neurotoxicity were observed. QT prolongation was also observed with very high doses of tamoxifen. There is no specific antidote for overdose of tamoxifen. Instead, treatment should be based on symptoms.

== Interactions ==
Patients with variant forms of the gene CYP2D6 may not receive full benefit from tamoxifen because of too slow metabolism of the tamoxifen prodrug into its active metabolites. On 18 October 2006, the Subcommittee for Clinical Pharmacology recommended relabeling tamoxifen to include information about this gene in the package insert. Certain CYP2D6 variations in breast cancer patients lead to a worse clinical outcome for tamoxifen treatment. Genotyping therefore has the potential for identification of women who have these CYP2D6 phenotypes and for whom the use of tamoxifen is associated with poor outcomes. Recent research has shown that 7–10% of women with breast cancer may not receive the full medical benefit from taking tamoxifen due to their genetic make-up. DNA Drug Safety Testing can examine DNA variations in the CYP2D6 and other important drug processing pathways. More than 20% of all clinically used medications are metabolized by CYP2D6 and knowing the CYP2D6 status of a person can help the doctor with the future selection of medications. Other molecular biomarkers may also be used to select appropriate patients likely to benefit from tamoxifen.

Recent studies suggest that taking the selective serotonin reuptake inhibitors (SSRIs) antidepressants paroxetine (Paxil), fluoxetine (Prozac), and sertraline (Zoloft) can decrease the effectiveness of tamoxifen, as these drugs compete for the CYP2D6 enzyme which is needed to metabolize tamoxifen into its active forms. A U.S. study presented at the American Society of Clinical Oncology's annual meeting in 2009 found that after two years, 7.5% of women who took only tamoxifen had a recurrence, compared with 16% who took either paroxetine, fluoxetine or sertraline, drugs considered to be the most potent CYP2D6 inhibitors. That difference translates to a 120% increase in the risk of breast cancer recurrence. Patients taking the SSRIs Celexa (citalopram), Lexapro (escitalopram), and Luvox (fluvoxamine) did not have an increased risk of recurrence, due to their lack of competitive metabolism for the CYP2D6 enzyme. A newer study demonstrated a clearer and stronger effect from paroxetine in causing the worst outcomes. Patients treated with both paroxetine and tamoxifen have a 67% increased risk of death from breast cancer, from 24% to 91%, depending on the duration of coadministration.

Tamoxifen interacts with certain other antiestrogens. The aromatase inhibitor aminoglutethimide induces the metabolism of tamoxifen. Conversely, the aromatase inhibitor letrozole does not affect the metabolism of tamoxifen. However, tamoxifen induces the metabolism of letrozole and significantly reduces its concentrations.

== Pharmacology ==
=== Pharmacodynamics ===
==== Selective estrogen receptor modulator activity ====
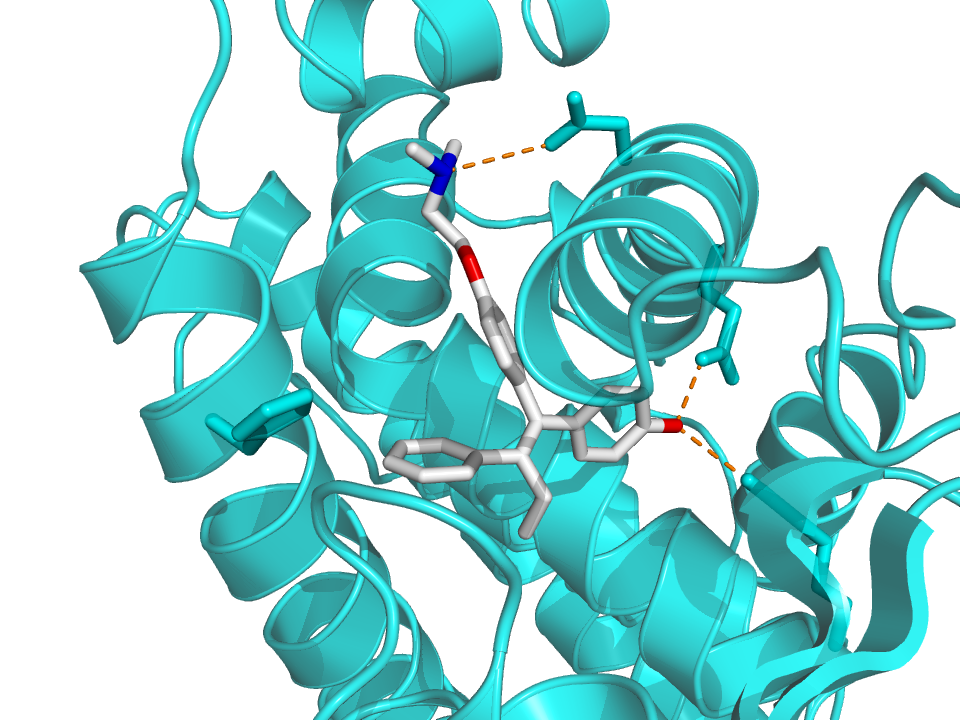
Crystallographic structure of afimoxifene (carbon = white, oxygen = red, nitrogen = blue) complexed with ligand binding domain of estrogen receptor alpha (ERα) (cyan ribbon)

Tamoxifen acts as a selective estrogen receptor modulator (SERM), or as a partial agonist of the estrogen receptors (ERs). It has mixed estrogenic and antiestrogenic activity, with its profile of effects differing by tissue. For instance, tamoxifen has predominantly antiestrogenic effects in the breasts but predominantly estrogenic effects in the uterus and liver. In breast tissue, tamoxifen acts as an ER antagonist so that transcription of estrogen-responsive genes is inhibited. A beneficial side effect of tamoxifen is that it prevents bone loss by acting as an ER agonist (i.e., mimicking the effects of estrogen) in this cell type. Therefore, by inhibiting osteoclasts, it prevents osteoporosis. When tamoxifen was launched as a drug, it was thought that tamoxifen would act as an ER antagonist in all tissues, including bone, and therefore it was feared that it would contribute to osteoporosis. It was therefore very surprising that the opposite effect was observed clinically. Hence tamoxifen's tissue selective action directly led to the formulation of the concept of SERMs.

Tissue-specific estrogenic and antiestrogenic activity of SERMs
| Medication | Breast | Bone | Liver | | | | Uterus | Vagina | Brain | |
| Medication | Breast | Bone | Lipids | Coagulation | SHBG | IGF-1 | Uterus | Vagina | Hot flashes | Gonadotropins |
|---|---|---|---|---|---|---|---|---|---|---|
| Estradiol | + | + | + | + | + | + | + | + | + | + |
| "Ideal SERM" | – | + | + | ± | ± | ± | – | + | + | ± |
| Bazedoxifene | – | + | + | + | + | ? | – | ± | – | ? |
| Clomifene | – | + | + | ? | + | + | – | ? | – | ± |
| Lasofoxifene | – | + | + | + | ? | ? | ± | ± | – | ? |
| Ospemifene | – | + | + | + | + | + | ± | ± | – | ± |
| Raloxifene | – | + | + | + | + | + | ± | – | – | ± |
| Tamoxifen | – | + | + | + | + | + | + | – | – | ± |
| Toremifene | – | + | + | + | + | + | + | – | – | ± |
Effect: + = Estrogenic / agonistic. ± = Mixed or neutral. – = Antiestrogenic / antagonistic. Note: SERMs generally increase gonadotropin levels in hypogonadal and eugonadal men as well as premenopausal women (antiestrogenic) but decrease gonadotropin levels in postmenopausal women (estrogenic). Sources: See template.

Tamoxifen is a long-acting SERM, with a nuclear retention of the ER–tamoxifen (or metabolite) complex of greater than 48 hours. It has relatively little affinity for the ERs itself and instead acts as a prodrug of active metabolites such as endoxifen (4-hydroxy-N-desmethyltamoxifen) and afimoxifene (4-hydroxytamoxifen; 4-OHT). These metabolites have approximately 30 to 100 times greater affinity for the ERs than tamoxifen itself. Per one study, tamoxifen had 7% and 6% of the affinity of estradiol for the ERα and ERβ, respectively, whereas afimoxifene had 178% and 338% of the affinity of estradiol for the ERα and ERβ, respectively. Hence, afimoxifene showed 25-fold higher affinity for the ERα and 56-fold higher affinity for the ERβ than tamoxifen. The antiestrogenic potencies of endoxifen and afimoxifene are very similar. However, endoxifen occurs in much higher concentrations than afimoxifene and is now thought to be the major active form of tamoxifen in the body.

Tamoxifen binds to ER competitively (with respect to the endogenous agonist estrogen) in tumor cells and other tissue targets, producing a nuclear complex that decreases DNA synthesis and inhibits estrogen effects. It is a nonsteroidal agent with potent antiestrogenic properties which compete with estrogen for binding sites in breast and other tissues. Tamoxifen causes cells to remain in the G_{0} and G_{1} phases of the cell cycle. Because it prevents (pre)cancerous cells from dividing but does not cause cell death, tamoxifen is cytostatic rather than cytocidal. Tamoxifen binds to ER, the ER/tamoxifen complex recruits other proteins known as co-repressors, and the complex then binds to DNA to modulate gene expression. Some of these proteins include NCoR and SMRT. Tamoxifen function can be regulated by a number of different variables including growth factors. Tamoxifen needs to block growth factor proteins such as ErbB2/HER2 because high levels of ErbB2 have been shown to occur in tamoxifen resistant cancers. Tamoxifen seems to require a protein PAX2 for its full anticancer effect. In the presence of high PAX2 expression, the tamoxifen/ER complex is able to suppress the expression of the pro-proliferative ERBB2 protein. In contrast, when AIB-1 expression is higher than PAX2, tamoxifen/ER complex upregulates the expression of ERBB2 resulting in stimulation of breast cancer growth.

Tamoxifen is antigonadotropic in postmenopausal women and partially suppresses levels of the gonadotropins, luteinizing hormone (LH) and follicle-stimulating hormone (FSH) in such women. However, it has progonadotropic effects in premenopausal women and increases estrogen levels by 6-fold in them. Due to the nature of tamoxifen as a competitive ER ligand, this increase in estrogen levels is liable to interfere with the antiestrogenic efficacy of tamoxifen. The effects of tamoxifen on breast cancer Ki-67 expression, sex hormone-binding globulin (SHBG) levels, and IGF-1 levels are dose-dependent across a dosage range of 1 to 20 mg/day in women with breast cancer. Tamoxifen has been found to decrease insulin-like growth factor 1 (IGF-1) levels by 17 to 38% in women and men. Suppression of IGF-1 production in the liver is a well-known action of estrogens and SERMs. A 10 mg/day dosage of tamoxifen is nearly as effective as a 20 mg/day dosage in suppressing IGF-1 levels.

==== Other activities ====
Afimoxifene is an agonist of the G protein-coupled estrogen receptor (GPER) with relatively low affinity. Its affinity for the receptor is in the range of 100 to 1,000 nM, relative to 3 to 6 nM for estradiol.

In addition to its activity as a SERM, afimoxifene binds to both the estrogen-related receptor β and estrogen-related receptor γ and is an antagonist of the estrogen-related receptor γ (ERRγ).

Norendoxifen (4-hydroxy-N,N-didesmethyltamoxifen), another active metabolite of tamoxifen, has been found to act as a potent competitive aromatase inhibitor (IC_{50} = 90 nM), and may also be involved in the antiestrogenic activity of tamoxifen.

In addition to its activity as a SERM, tamoxifen is a potent and selective protein kinase C inhibitor, and is active in this regard at therapeutic concentrations. This action is thought to underlie the efficacy of tamoxifen in the treatment of bipolar disorder.

Tamoxifen is an inhibitor of P-glycoprotein.

In 2018, it was discovered that tamoxifen directly interacts with the dopamine transporter (DAT) and acts as an atypical dopamine reuptake inhibitor (DRI). It has weak potency (54% inhibition of dopamine uptake at 10 μM) and lacks any stimulant or depressant effects when administered by itself. However, tamoxifen dose-dependently blocks amphetamine-mediated dopamine release and psychostimulant-like effects in animals. This unusual profile of DRI activity has made tamoxifen of potential interest as a starting point for structural modification to develop novel pharmaceutical drugs for treatment of stimulant use disorder.

In 2025 Tamoxifen has also been reported to interact with tubulin and inhibit its polymerization.

=== Pharmacokinetics ===
==== Absorption ====
Tamoxifen is rapidly and extensively absorbed from the intestines with oral administration. The oral bioavailability of tamoxifen is approximately 100%, which is suggestive of minimal first-pass metabolism in the intestines and liver. Following intake, peak levels of tamoxifen occur after three to seven hours. Steady state levels of tamoxifen are reached typically after 3 to 4 weeks but possibly up to 16 weeks of daily administration. Steady state levels of afimoxifene are achieved after 8 weeks of daily tamoxifen administration. Peak levels of tamoxifen after a single 40 mg oral dose were 65 ng/mL and steady state levels at 20 mg/day were 310 ng/mL. Levels of tamoxifen show clear dose dependency across a dosage range of 1 to 20 mg/day. Endoxifen levels are approximately 5 to 10 times higher than afimoxifene levels, with large interindividual variability. Endoxifen levels have been reported as 10.8 to 15.9 ng/mL at steady state in CYP2D6 normal metabolizers during therapy with 20 mg/day tamoxifen. The most abundant metabolites of tamoxifen in terms of circulating concentrations are N-desmethyltamoxifen, N,N-didesmethyltamoxifen, (Z)-endoxifen, and tamoxifen N-oxide.

==== Distribution ====
The volume of distribution of tamoxifen is 50 to 60 L/kg and its clearance has been estimated as 1.2 to 5.1 L/hour. High concentrations of tamoxifen have been found in breast, uterus, liver, kidney, lung, pancreas, and ovary tissue in animals and humans. Levels of tamoxifen in the uterus have been found to be 2- to 3-fold higher than in the circulation and in the breasts 10-fold higher than in the circulation. The plasma protein binding of tamoxifen and afimoxifene is greater than 99%. A majority of tamoxifen is bound to albumin. Albumin alone binds 98.8% of tamoxifen while other plasma proteins are not greatly involved.

==== Metabolism ====
Tamoxifen and its metabolites in humans
| Compound | Mean plasma concentrations | Effect on ER / affinity for ER^{a} |
|---|---|---|
| Tamoxifen | 190–420 nmol/L | Weak antagonist / 2% |
| N-Desmethyltamoxifen | 280–800 nmol/L | Weak antagonist / 1% |
| N,N-Desmethyltamoxifen | 90–120 nmol/L | Weak antagonist |
| Endoxifen | 14–130 nmol/L | Strong antagonist / equal to afimoxifene |
| Afimoxifene | 3–17 nmol/L^{b} | Strong antagonist / 188% |
| α-Hydroxytamoxifen | 1 nmol/L | None |
| 3,4-Dihydroxytamoxifen | ? | Weak antagonist / high affinity |
| Tamoxifen N-oxide | 15–24 nmol/L | Weak antagonist^{c} |
Footnotes: ^{a} = Estradiol is 100%. ^{b} = One study reported a much higher concentration (67 nmol/L). ^{c} = Might be due to reduction to tamoxifen.

Tamoxifen is a prodrug and is metabolized in the liver by the cytochrome P450 isoforms CYP3A4, CYP2C9, and CYP2D6 into active metabolites such as endoxifen (4-hydroxy-N-desmethyltamoxifen) and afimoxifene (4-hydroxytamoxifen). Conversion of tamoxifen by N-demethylation into N-desmethyltamoxifen, which is catalyzed primarily by CYP3A4 and CYP3A5, is responsible for approximately 92% of tamoxifen metabolism. Conversely, 4-hydroxylation of tamoxifen into afimoxifene is responsible for only about 7% of tamoxifen metabolism. Following its formation, N-desmethyltamoxifen is oxidized into several other metabolites, the most notable of which is endoxifen. Another active metabolite, norendoxifen (4-hydroxy-N,N-didesmethyltamoxifen), is formed via N-demethylation of endoxifen or 4-hydroxylation of N,N-didesmethyltamoxifen. Tamoxifen and its metabolites undergo conjugation, including glucuronidation and sulfation. Tamoxifen may inhibit its own metabolism.

==== Elimination ====
Tamoxifen has a long elimination half-life of typically 5 to 7 days, with a range of 4 to 11 days. Similarly, the half-life of afimoxifene is 14 days. Conversely, the half-life of endoxifen is 50 to 70 hours (2–3 days). The long half-lives of tamoxifen and afimoxifene are attributed to their high plasma protein binding as well as to enterohepatic recirculation. Upon discontinuation of treatment, levels of tamoxifen and its metabolites persist in the circulation for at least 6 weeks. Tamoxifen is excreted in bile and is eliminated in feces, while small amounts are eliminated in urine.

== Chemistry ==
Tamoxifen is a nonsteroidal SERM of the triphenylethylene family and was structurally derived from diethylstilbestrol-like estrogens and antiestrogens such as chlorotrianisene and ethamoxytriphetol. Initially, clomifene was synthesized, and tamoxifen was developed subsequently. Tamoxifen is closely related structurally to other triphenylethylenes, such as clomifene, nafoxidine, ospemifene, toremifene, and numerous others. Other SERMs, like raloxifene, are structurally distinct from tamoxifen and other triphenylethylenes.

== History ==
In the late 1950s, pharmaceutical companies were actively researching a newly discovered class of anti-estrogen compounds in the hope of developing a morning-after contraceptive pill. Arthur L Walpole was a reproductive endocrinologist who led such a team at the Alderley Park research laboratories of ICI Pharmaceuticals. It was there in 1962 that chemist Dora Richardson first synthesized tamoxifen, back then known as ICI-46,474, when she was looking to create triphenylethylene derivatives for the contraceptive pill project that her team was researching.

This compound was originally created to work as an estrogen inhibitor, but instead was found to stimulate ovulation in participants of the drug testing trial. Walpole and his colleagues filed a UK patent covering this compound in 1962, but patent protection on this compound was repeatedly denied in the US until the 1980s. Tamoxifen did eventually receive marketing approval as a fertility treatment, but the class of compounds never proved useful in human contraception. A link between estrogen and breast cancer had been known for many years, but cancer treatments were not a corporate priority at the time, and Walpole's personal interests were important in keeping support for the compound alive in the face of this and the lack of patent protection. It was only when Walpole threatened to leave his position that corporate decided to allow trials and testing for tamoxifen as a drug that could be used to treat breast cancer. Without Walpole's effort towards defending the work that his team had done in discovering a possibly revolutionary source for breast cancer treatment, tamoxifen could have become a discarded or under-researched idea. Walpole's team consisted of Dora Richardson and G. A. Snow, who worked on the chemistry portion of the project, along with G. E. Paget and J. K. Walley, who focused primarily on the biological side.

Tamoxifen is one of three drugs in an anti-angiogenetic protocol developed by Dr. Judah Folkman, a researcher at Children's Hospital at Harvard Medical School in Boston. Folkman discovered in the 1970s that angiogenesis – the growth of new blood vessels – plays a significant role in the development of cancer. Since his discovery, an entirely new field of cancer research has developed. Clinical trials on angiogenesis inhibitors have been underway since 1992 using many different drugs. The Harvard researchers developed a specific protocol for a golden retriever named Navy who was cancer-free after receiving the prescribed cocktail of celecoxib, doxycycline, and tamoxifen – the treatment subsequently became known as the Navy Protocol. Furthermore, tamoxifen treatment alone has been shown to have anti-angiogenetic effects in animal models of cancer which appear to be, at least in part, independent of tamoxifen's ER antagonist properties.

Other antiestrogens, such as ethamoxytriphetol (MER-25) and clomifene (MRL-41), were assessed for treatment of breast cancer and found to be effective before tamoxifen, but were plagued with toxicity issues. The first clinical study of tamoxifen took place at the Christie Hospital in 1971, and showed a convincing effect in advanced breast cancer, but nevertheless ICI's development programme came close to termination when it was reviewed in 1972. In an unpublished article from the early days of the trial, Dora Richardson documented her team's excitement about tamoxifen's effects in counteracting infertility problems and the early positive effects found in breast cancer patients. Unfortunately, this work was not well received by everyone, as the team was supposed to be looking for a contraceptive pill. Tamoxifen's further development may have been bolstered by a second clinical study by Harold W.C. Ward at the Queen Elizabeth Hospital, Birmingham. Ward's study showed a more definitive response to the drug at a higher dosage. Walpole also may have helped to convince the company to market tamoxifen for late stage breast cancer in 1973. He was also instrumental in funding V. Craig Jordan to work on tamoxifen. In 1972, ICI Pharmaceuticals Division abandoned development of tamoxifen for financial reasons. The drug was subsequently reinvented from a failed contraceptive, to become tamoxifen, the gold standard for the adjuvant treatment of breast cancer and the pioneering medicine for chemprevention for high-risk women. Two books, Estrogen Action, Selective Estrogen Receptor Modulators and Women's Health (Imperial College Press 2013) and Tamoxifen: Pioneering Medicine in Breast Cancer (Springer 2013) tell this story.

Comparison of early clinical experience with antiestrogens for advanced breast cancer
| Antiestrogen | Dosage | Year(s) | Response rate | Adverse effects |
|---|---|---|---|---|
| Ethamoxytriphetol | 500–4,500 mg/day | 1960 | 25% | Acute psychotic episodes |
| Clomifene | 100–300 mg/day | 1964–1974 | 34% | Risks of cataracts |
| Nafoxidine | 180–240 mg/day | 1976 | 31% | Cataracts, ichthyosis, photophobia |
| Tamoxifen | 20–40 mg/day | 1971–1973 | 31% | Transient thrombocytopenia^{a} |
Footnotes: ^{a} = "The particular advantage of this drug is the low incidence of troublesome side effects (25)." "Side effects were usually trivial (26)." Sources:

1980 saw the publication of the first trial to show that tamoxifen given in addition to chemotherapy improved survival for patients with early breast cancer. In advanced disease, tamoxifen is now only recognized as effective in ER+ patients, but the early trials did not select ER+ patients, and by the mid-1980s the clinical trial picture was not showing a major advantage for tamoxifen. Nevertheless, tamoxifen had a relatively mild side-effect profile, and a number of large trials continued.

The pharmacology of SERMs was discovered, defined, and deciphered during the 1980s. A clinical strategy was described that led to the creation of SERMs as a group of multifunctional medicines aimed at the treatment or prevention of many conditions in postmenopausal women, e.g. osteoporosis and breast cancer.

The early sales of tamoxifen in both the UK and in the U.S. far exceeded ICI's original estimate, but despite this, at the annual portfolio review ICI's board members still asserted that "there was no market for cancer", leaving the drug's marketing success to rely on its clinical results and clinicians' and scientists' interests in it. Shortly after, Dora Richardson published a history of tamoxifen that, unusually for that type of paper, included personal accounts and letters from patients who attributed their healing to the drug. This testimony from cancer patients using tamoxifen helped to shape and push forward research, by justifying it both morally and scientifically to corporations.

It was not until 1998 that the meta-analysis of the Oxford-based Early Breast Cancer Trialists' Collaborative Group showed definitively that tamoxifen was effective for early breast cancer.

== Society and culture ==
=== Brand names ===
Tamoxifen is marketed under the brand names Nolvadex and Soltamox, and a variety of other brand names throughout the world.

=== Economics ===
Global sales of tamoxifen in 2001 were approximately $1.02 billion. Since the expiration of the patent in 2002, it is widely available as a generic drug around the world. As of 2004, tamoxifen was the world's largest selling hormonal drug for the treatment of breast cancer.

== Research ==
In McCune–Albright syndrome (MAS) tamoxifen has been used to treat premature puberty and the consequences of premature puberty. Tamoxifen has been seen to decrease rapid bone maturation which is the result of excessive estrogen and alter predicted adult height (PAH). The same effects have also been seen in short pubertal boys. However, one in vitro study in 2007 and later an in vivo study in 2008 have shown that tamoxifen induces apoptosis in growth plate chondrocytes, reduces serum insulin-like growth factor 1 (IGF-1) levels and causes persistent retardation of longitudinal and cortical radial bone growth in young male rats, leading the researchers to express concern giving tamoxifen to growing individuals.

Tamoxifen has been studied in the treatment of the rare conditions of retroperitoneal fibrosis and idiopathic sclerosing mesenteritis. It has also been proposed as part of a treatment plan for Riedel's thyroiditis.

Tamoxifen is used as a research tool to trigger tissue-specific gene expression in many conditional expression constructs in genetically modified animals including a version of the Cre-Lox recombination technique. While widely used in transgenic research, the strong anabolic effect of tamoxifen on bone might confound this approach, especially as it relates to bone-targeted constructs.

Tamoxifen may be effective in the treatment of mania in people with bipolar disorder. This is thought to be due to blockade of protein kinase C (PKC), an enzyme that regulates neuron activity in the brain. Researchers believe PKC is overactive during the mania in bipolar patients. Endoxifen, a major active metabolite of tamoxifen with a 4-fold more potent PKC inhibition, has been approved in India for bipolar disorder, and is marketed under the name Zonalta by Intas Pharmaceuticals.

There is growing evidence for the use of tamoxifen as a neuroprotective agent against brain damage caused by traumatic brain injury, stroke, ischemic events, and vascular cognitive impairment in males, who usually tolerate the drug well. In animal studies, it has facilitated the restoration of male white matter lesions and protected against silent infarcts, particularly in the hippocampus. Potential mechanisms include reducing microglial inflammation responses, such as from M1-type macrophages, reducing apoptosis induced by caspase-3 cascades, and preserving ERα in neurons and surrounding astrocytes. Tamoxifen similarly protected against the effects of secondary spinal cord injury by reducing microglial inflammation responses and helping to preserve the blood-spinal cord barrier. Unfortunately, due to the well-established estrogenic side effects in females, particularly pre-menopausal and ovariectomized females, these potential applications are limited. Despite this, treatments for these conditions are currently limited, consisting primarily of thrombolysis using tissue-type plasminogen activator, manual thrombectomy, and craniectomy procedures. As such, this avenue of research is still ongoing.
