= Merchant of Venus =

1988 board game

- Designers: Richard Hamblen
- Publishers: Avalon Hill
- Publication: 1988
- Players: 1–6
- Setup time: 15 minutes
- Playing time: 2–6 hours
- Chance: Medium
- Age range: 12 and up
- Skills: Planning, Negotiation

Merchant of Venus is a board game, published in 1988 by Avalon Hill, set in an unexplored part of the galaxy during a reawakening of galactic civilization. Players move around the board as traders discovering long forgotten pockets of civilization and buying and selling goods. The game can be played by one to six players. In tournaments it is usually played by four players. The solitaire version, which relies heavily on combat with a militaristic race, has different game mechanics.

The name of the game is a pun on the Shakespeare play Merchant of Venice. The planet Venus does not actually appear in the game.

== Aim ==
The aim of the game is to acquire a set amount of wealth ($1000, $2000, $3000 or $4000). The first player to hold the required amount in cash and deeds is declared the winner.

== Strategy ==
The length of the game impacts on the strategy. In short games trade routes will not be well developed whereas in longer games extensive trade routes will develop.

The game has at least two predictable phases. In the early part of the game, players are discovering the identity of the cultures in the fourteen solar systems available for trade, and often find valuable artifacts from an earlier period of civilization. When discovering a culture, players get bonuses, which they can use to buy goods. Once the board has been largely revealed, the game focuses on moving goods from cultures that build to other races that demand the goods. Often the winner will be a player who is effective in investing his mid-game purchase in factories and orbital ports that pay a commission when other players use the ports. Judging whether a player is coming up on a win often consists of looking at the number of deeds the player owns.

Later in the game, calculating the sale, purchase and commission on several transactions can become a relatively complicated event, especially when players are expecting a fast turnaround.

The game remains popular decades after publication in part thanks to its whimsical theme, but also because it allows a number of potential win strategies and calls on the players to make many interesting decisions.

== 2012 Second Edition ==
On October 24, 2011, game publisher Stronghold Games announced that it had reached an agreement with designer Richard Hamblen to reprint the game for release in 2012. Later that same day, publisher Fantasy Flight Games announced that it had acquired the right to republish the game from Hasbro, which Hasbro had acquired through their purchase of Avalon Hill. Both companies issued statements in the days following, maintaining a cordial tone but each asserting its right and intention to reprint the game.

On June 27, 2012, both Stronghold Games and Fantasy Flight Games announced that they had come to an agreement regarding the fate of the game. The second edition was released in November 2012 by Fantasy Flight Games with Stronghold Games consulting on the project. It contains a two-sided game board and two sets of rules, allowing for play of both the original game and an updated one that is more in line with contemporary boardgame design.

== Reception ==
Mike Siggins reviewed Merchant of Venus for Games International magazine, and gave it 4 stars out of 5, and stated that "Richard Hamblin has devised a system that has some clever design tricks, works within a reasonable time, has plenty of options and offers high playability and balance. With the possible exception of SPI's out of print Star Trader, I would say it is the best trading game so far."

John ONeill of Black Gate commented: "Unlike Avalon Hill's other science fiction games — like Stellar Conquest and Alpha Omega — the focus of Merchant of Venus wasn't crushing your opponents with massive fleets of warships. Players were explorers and traders in an unexplored part of the galaxy during a reawakening of galactic civilization, discovering long-lost pockets of civilization, and opening fabulously profitable trade routes. Playable with up to six players, the game also had an intriguing solitaire version, which featured action-heavy combat with a strange militaristic race."

== Reviews ==
- Casus Belli #49
