= Trauma (role-playing game) =

Trauma is a 1988 role-playing game published by Aujourd'hui Communications.

== Gameplay ==
Trauma is a game in which a contemporary roleplaying game involves suspense and real-world dangers, offering rules, scenarios, and tools for players to create player characters like themselves facing extraordinary crises.

== Reviews ==
- Casus Belli #45
- Jeux & Stratégie #52
