= Outline of medicine =

Diagnosis, treatment, and prevention of illness

The Rod of Asclepius, a symbol commonly associated with medicine

The following outline is provided as an overview of and topical guide to medicine:

Medicine – science of healing. It encompasses a variety of health care practices evolved to maintain health by the prevention and treatment of illness.

== Aims ==
- Cure
- Health
- Homeostasis
- Medical ethics
- Prevention of illness
- Palliation

== Branches of medicine ==
1. Anesthesiology – practice of medicine dedicated to the relief of pain and total care of the surgical patient before, during and after surgery.
2. Alternative medicine; is any healing practice, "that does not fall within the realm of conventional medicine.
3. Cardiology – branch of medicine that deals with disorders of the heart and the blood vessels.
4. Critical care medicine – focuses on life support and the intensive care of the seriously ill.
5. Dentistry – branch of medicine that deals with treatment of diseases in the oral cavity
6. Dermatology – branch of medicine that deals with the skin, hair, and nails.
7. Emergency medicine – focuses on care provided in the emergency department
8. Endocrinology – branch of medicine that deals with disorders of the endocrine system.
9. Epidemiology – study of cause and prevalence of diseases and programs to contain them
10. First aid – assistance given to any person experiencing a sudden illness or injury, with care provided to preserve life, prevent the condition from worsening, and/or promote recovery. It includes initial intervention in a serious condition prior to professional medical help being available, such as performing CPR while awaiting an ambulance, as well as the complete treatment of minor conditions, such as applying a plaster to a cut.
11. Gastroenterology – branch of medicine that deals with the study and care of the digestive system.
12. General practice (often called family medicine) is a branch of medicine that specializes in primary care.
13. Geriatrics – branch of medicine that deals with the general health and well-being of the elderly.
14. Gynaecology – diagnosis and treatment of the female reproductive system
15. Hematology – branch of medicine that deals with the blood and the circulatory system.
16. Hepatology – branch of medicine that deals with the liver, gallbladder and the biliary system.
17. Infectious disease (Outline of concepts) – branch of medicine that deals with the diagnosis and management of infectious disease, especially for complex cases and immunocompromised patients.
18. Internal medicine – involved with adult diseases
19. Neurology – branch of medicine that deals with the brain and the nervous system.
20. Nephrology – branch of medicine which deals with the kidneys.
21. Obstetrics – care of women during and after pregnancy
22. Occupational medicine – branch of medicine concerned with the maintenance of health in the workplace
23. Oncology – branch of medicine that studies the types of cancer.
24. Ophthalmology – branch of medicine that deals with the eyes.
25. Optometry – branch of medicine that involves examining the eyes and applicable visual systems for defects or abnormalities as well as the medical diagnosis and management of eye disease.
26. Orthopaedics – branch of medicine that deals with conditions involving the musculoskeletal system.
27. Otorhinolaryngology – branch of medicine that deals with the ears, nose and throat.
28. Pathology – study of causes and pathogenesis of diseases.
29. Pediatrics – branch of medicine that deals with the general health and well-being of children and in some countries like the U.S. young adults.
30. Physiatry – comprising physical medicine and rehabilitation
31. Preventive medicine – measures taken for disease prevention, as opposed to disease treatment.
32. Psychiatry – branch of medicine that deals with the study, diagnosis, treatment, and prevention of mental disorders.
33. Pulmonology – branch of medicine that deals with the respiratory system.
34. Radiology – branch of medicine that employs medical imaging to diagnose and treat disease.
35. Sports medicine – branch of medicine that deals with physical fitness and the treatment and prevention of injuries related to sports and exercise.
36. Rheumatology – branch of medicine that deals with the diagnosis and treatment of rheumatic diseases.
37. Surgery – branch of medicine that uses operative techniques to investigate or treat both disease and injury, or to help improve bodily function or appearance.
38. Urology – branch of medicine that deals with the urinary system of both sexes and the male reproductive system

=== History of medicine ===
- History of medicine
- Prehistoric medicine
- Greco-Roman medicine
- Medicine in the medieval Islamic world
- Medieval medicine of Western Europe
- Ancient Egyptian medicine
- Babylonian medicine
- Ancient Iranian medicine

=== Alternative medicine ===
- Homeopathy
- Traditional African Medicine
- Herbalism
- Siddha medicine
  - Ayurveda
- Traditional Chinese medicine
- Jewish medicine

== Medical biology ==
Medical biology

=== Fields of medical biology ===
- Anatomy – study of the physical structure of organisms. In contrast to macroscopic or gross anatomy, cytology and histology are concerned with microscopic structures.
  - List of anatomical topics
    - List of bones of the human skeleton
    - List of homologues of the human reproductive system
    - List of human anatomical features
    - List of human anatomical parts named after people
    - List of human blood components
    - List of human hormones
    - List of human nerves
    - List of muscles of the human body
    - List of regions in the human brain
- Biochemistry – study of the chemistry taking place in living organisms, especially the structure and function of their chemical components.
- Bioinformatics
- Biological engineering
- Biophysics
- Biostatistics – application of statistics to biological fields in the broadest sense. A knowledge of biostatistics is essential in the planning, evaluation, and interpretation of medical research. It is also fundamental to epidemiology and evidence-based medicine.
- Biotechnology
  - Nanobiotechnology
- Cell biology – microscopic study of individual cells.
- Embryology – study of the early development of organisms.
- Gene therapy
- Genetics – study of genes, and their role in biological inheritance.
  - Cytogenetics
- Histology – study of the structures of biological tissues by light microscopy, electron microscopy and immunohistochemistry.
- Immunology – study of the immune system, which includes the innate and adaptive immune system in humans, for example.
- Laboratory medical biology
- Microbiology – study of microorganisms, including protozoa, bacteria, fungi, and viruses.
- Molecular biology
- Neuroscience (outline) – includes those disciplines of science that are related to the study of the nervous system. A main focus of neuroscience is the biology and physiology of the human brain and spinal cord.
- Parasitology
- Pathology – study of disease, including the causes, course, progression and resolution thereof.
- Physiology – study of the normal functioning of the body and the underlying regulatory mechanisms.
- Systems biology
- Virology
- Toxicology – study of hazardous effects of drugs and poisons.
- and many others (typically, life sciences that pertain to medicine)

=== Illness (diseases and disorders) ===
- Disease
- Disability
- List of cancer types
- List of childhood diseases
- List of diseases caused by insects
- List of eponymous diseases
- List of fictional diseases
- List of food-borne illness outbreaks in the United States
- List of genetic disorders
- List of human parasitic diseases
- List of illnesses related to poor nutrition
- List of infectious diseases
  - List of infectious diseases causing flu-like syndrome
- List of latent human viral infections
- List of mental illnesses
- List of neurological disorders
- List of notifiable diseases
- List of parasites (human)
- List of skin-related conditions
- List of systemic diseases with ocular manifestations

== Medical practice ==
Practice of medicine

- Physical examination
- Diagnosis
- Surgery
- Medication

== Drugs ==
Drugs

- Drug
- Pharmaceutical drug/ Medication
- Recreational drug
- List of anaesthetic drugs
- List of antibiotics
- List of antiviral drugs
- List of bestselling drugs
- List of drugs affected by grapefruit
- List of drugs banned from the Olympics
- List of controlled drugs in the United Kingdom
- List of medical inhalants
- List of monoclonal antibodies
- List of psychedelic drugs
- List of psychiatric medications
  - List of psychiatric medications by condition treated
- List of schedules of controlled substances (USA)
  - List of Schedule I drugs
  - List of Schedule II drugs
  - List of Schedule III drugs
  - List of Schedule IV drugs
  - List of Schedule V drugs
- List of withdrawn drugs

== Medical equipment ==
Medical equipment

- MRI
- Computed axial tomography

== Medical labs ==
- Blood test

== Medical facilities ==
- Clinic
- Walk in clinic
- Hospice
  - List of hospice programs
- Hospital
- Private hospital
- Public hospital
  - List of hospitals in the United States
    - List of burn centers in the United States
    - List of Veterans Affairs medical facilities

== Medical education ==
Medical education – education related to the practice of being a medical practitioner; either the initial training to become a physician, additional training thereafter, and fellowship.

- Medical school
  - List of medical schools
- Internship
- Residency
- Fellowship

== Medical research ==
Medical research

- Clinical research (outline)

== Medical jargon ==
Medical terminology

- List of medical roots, suffixes and prefixes

=== Medical abbreviations and acronyms ===
- Acronyms in healthcare
- List of medical abbreviations: Overview
- List of medical abbreviations: Latin abbreviations
- List of abbreviations for diseases and disorders
- List of abbreviations for medical organisations and personnel
- List of abbreviations used in medical prescriptions
- List of abbreviations used in health informatics
- List of optometric abbreviations

=== Medical glossaries ===
- Glossary of alternative medicine
- Glossary of anatomical terminology, definitions and abbreviations
- Glossary of clinical research
- Glossary of communication disorders
- Glossary of diabetes
- Glossary of medical terms related to communications disorders
- Glossary of medicine
- Glossary of psychiatry

== Medical organizations ==
- List of medical organisations
  - List of pharmacy associations

=== Government agencies ===
- Centers for Disease Control and Prevention (US)
- Food and Drug Administration (US)
- National Academy of Medicine (US)
- National Institutes of Health (US)

== Medical publications ==
- List of important publications in medicine
- List of medical journals
  - List of defunct medical journals
- List of medical and health informatics journals

== Persons influential in medicine ==
- List of physicians

=== Medical scholars ===
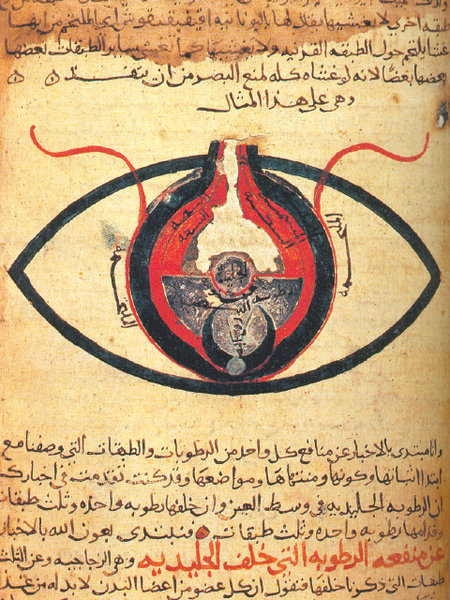
An Arabic manuscript, dated 1200 CE, titled Anatomy of the Eye, authored by al-Mutadibih

- The earliest known physician, Hesyre.
- The first recorded female physician, Peseshet.
- Borsippa, a Babylonian who wrote the Diagnostic Handbook.
- The Iranian chemist, Rhazes.
- Avicenna, the philosopher and physician.
- Greco-Roman medical scholars:
  - Hippocrates, commonly considered the father of modern medicine.
  - Galen, known for his ambitious surgeries.
  - Andreas Vesalius
  - Oribasius, a Byzantine who compiled medical knowledge.
- Abu al-Qasim, an Islamic physician known as the father of modern surgery.
- Medieval European medical scholars:
  - Theodoric Borgognoni, one of the most significant surgeons of the medieval period, responsible for introducing and promoting important surgical advances including basic antiseptic practice and the use of anaesthetics.
  - Guy de Chauliac, considered to be one of the earliest fathers of modern surgery, after the great Islamic surgeon, Abu al-Qasim.
  - Realdo Colombo, anatomist and surgeon who contributed to understanding of lesser circulation.
  - Michael Servetus, considered to be the first European to discover the pulmonary circulation of the blood.
  - Ambroise Paré suggested using ligatures instead of cauterisation and tested the bezoar stone.
  - William Harvey describes blood circulation.
  - John Hunter, surgeon.
  - Amato Lusitano described venous valves and guessed their function.
  - Garcia de Orta first to describe Cholera and other tropical diseases and herbal treatments
  - Percivall Pott, surgeon.
  - Sir Thomas Browne physician and medical neologist.
  - Thomas Sydenham physician and so-called "English Hippocrates."
- Kuan Huang, who studied abroad and brought his techniques back to homeland china.
- Ignaz Semmelweis, who studied and decreased the incidence of childbed fever.
- Louis Pasteur and Robert Koch founded bacteriology.
- Alexander Fleming, whose accidental discovery of penicillin advanced the field of antibiotics.

=== Pioneers in medicine ===
- Wilhelm Röntgen discovered x-rays, earning the first Nobel Prize in Physics in 1901, "in recognition of the extraordinary services he has rendered by the discovery of the remarkable rays (or x-rays)," and invented radiography.
- Christiaan Barnard performed the first heart transplant
- Ian Donald pioneered the use of the ultrasound scan, which led to its use as a diagnostic tool.
- Sir Godfrey Hounsfield invented the computed tomography (CT) scanner, sharing the 1979 Nobel Prize in Physiology or Medicine with Allan M. Cormack, "for the development of computer assisted tomography."
- Sir Peter Mansfield invented the MRI scanner, sharing the 2003 Nobel Prize in Physiology or Medicine with Paul Lauterbur for their "discoveries concerning magnetic resonance imaging."
- Robert Jarvik, inventor of the artificial heart.
- Anthony Atala, creator of the first lab-grown organ, an artificial urinary bladder.

== General concepts in medicine ==
- Epidemiology – study of the demographics of disease processes, and includes, but is not limited to, the study of epidemics.
- Nutrition – study of the relationship of food and drink to health and disease, especially in determining an optimal diet. Medical nutrition therapy is done by dietitians and is prescribed for diabetes, cardiovascular diseases, weight and eating disorders, allergies, malnutrition, and neoplastic diseases.
- Pharmacology – study of drugs and their actions.
- Psychology – an academic and applied discipline that involves the scientific study of mental functions and behaviors.
- Outline of nutrition
  - List of macronutrients
  - List of micronutrients
- Outline of emergency medicine
  - List of emergency medicine courses
- List of surgical procedures
  - List of eye surgical procedures
- List of disabilities
  - List of disability-related terms with negative connotations
- List of medical emergencies
- List of eponymous fractures
- List of AIDS-related topics
- List of clinically important bacteria
- List of distinct cell types in the adult human body
- List of eponymous medical signs
- List of life extension-related topics
- List of medical inhalants
- List of medical symptoms
- List of oncology-related terms
- List of oral health and dental topics
- List of pharmaceutical companies
- List of psychotherapies
- List of vaccine topics
- Outline of autism
- Outline of exercise
- Outline of obstetrics (pregnancy and childbirth)
- Outline of psychology
- Pharmacology, for list of medicinal substances

== See also ==
- Health
  - Outline of health
    - Outline of health sciences
