= List of abbreviations for diseases and disorders =

This list contains acronyms and initials related to diseases (infectious or non-infectious) and medical disorders.

== A ==
| Acronyms | Diseases and disorders |
|---|---|
| AAA | Abdominal aortic aneurysm |
| AAS | Aarskog–Scott syndrome |
| ABCD syndrome | Albinism, black lock, cell migration disorder |
| ABPA | Allergic bronchopulmonary aspergillosis |
| ACC | Agenesis of the corpus callosum |
| ACS | Acute coronary syndrome |
| ACTH deficiency | Adrenocorticotropic hormone deficiency |
| ACUG | Arthrocutaneouveal granulomatosis (see Blau syndrome) |
| ACVD | Atherosclerotic cardiovascular disease |
| AD | Alzheimer's disease |
| AD | Attachment disorder |
| ADD | Attention deficit disorder |
| ADD-RT | Attention deficit disorder – residual type |
| ADEM | Acute disseminated encephalomyelitis |
| ADHD | Attention deficit hyperactivity disorder |
| AERD | Aspirin exacerbated respiratory disease |
| AF or A-fib | Atrial fibrillation |
| AGS | Aicardi–Goutières syndrome |
| AH | Acquired hemophilia |
| AHA | Acquired hemophilia A |
| AHB | Acquired hemophilia B |
| AHC | Alternating hemiplegia of childhood |
| AHF | Alkhurma hemorrhagic fever |
| AKI | Acute kidney injury |
| AIDS | Acquired immune deficiency syndrome |
| AIP | Acute intermittent porphyria |
| AIWS | Alice in Wonderland syndrome |
| ALA DD | Doss porphyria/ALA dehydratase deficiency/Plumboporphyria (the disease is known by multiple names) |
| ALD | Alcoholic liver disease |
| ALI | Acute lung injury |
| ALL | Acute lymphoblastic lymphoma, acute lymphocytic leukemia |
| ALS | Amyotrophic lateral sclerosis |
| AMD | Age-related macular degeneration |
| AML | Acute myelogenous leukemia |
| AN | Anorexia nervosa |
| AOCD | Anemia of chronic disease |
| AODM | Adult onset diabetes mellitus |
| AOS | Apraxia of speech |
| APA | Aldosterone-producing adenoma |
| APD | Auditory processing disorder |
| APS | Antiphospholipid syndrome |
| ARBD | Alcohol-related birth defects |
| ARD | Adult Refsum disease |
| ARDS | Acute respiratory distress syndrome |
| ARND | Alcohol-related neurodevelopmental disorder |
| ARM | Anorectal malformation |
| AS | Ankylosing spondylitis |
| AS | Asperger syndrome |
| ASCVD | Atherosclerotic cardiovascular disease |
| ASD | Atrial septal defect |
| ASD(s) | Autism spectrum disorders |
| ASHF | Acute systolic heart failure |
| ASMD | Acid sphingomyelinase deficiency (see Niemann-Pick disease) |
| ASPD | Antisocial personality disorder |
| ASS | African sleeping sickness |
| A-T | Ataxia-telangiectasia |
| AVMs | Arteriovenous malformations |
| AvPD | Avoidant personality disorder |

== B ==
| Acronyms | Diseases and disorders |
|---|---|
| BA | Bronchial Asthma |
| BBS | Bardet-Biedl syndrome |
| BBS | Bashful bladder syndrome (see paruresis) |
| BEB | Benign essential blepharospasm |
| BD | Behçet disease |
| BD | Binswanger's disease |
| BEH | Behaviorally/emotionally handicapped |
| BH | Behaviorally handicapped |
| BL | Burkitt lymphoma |
| BMD | Becker's muscular dystrophy |
| BPAD | Bipolar affective disorder |
| BPD | Borderline personality disorder (often misattributed to bipolar disorder) |
| BPH | Benign prostatic hyperplasia |
| BRBNS | Blue rubber bleb nevus syndrome |
| BRIC1 | Benign recurrent intrahepatic cholestasis 1 |
| BRRS | Bannayan–Riley–Ruvalcaba syndrome |
| BrS | Brugada syndrome |
| BS | Bloom syndrome |
| BSE | Bovine spongiform encephalopathy |
| BSS | Brown-Séquard syndrome |
| BV | Bacterial vaginosis |

== C ==
| Acronyms | Diseases and disorders |
|---|---|
| CA | Cancer |
| CACH | Childhood ataxia with central nervous system hypomyelination (see vanishing white matter disease) |
| CAD | Coronary artery disease |
| CADASIL | Cerebral autosomal dominant arteriopathy with subcortical infarcts and leukoencephalopathy |
| CAP | Community acquired pneumonia |
| CAPA | COVID-19–associated pulmonary aspergillosis |
| CAPD | Central auditory processing disorder |
| CCD | Considerable conduct disorder |
| CCHF | Crimean-Congo haemorrhagic fever |
| CCHS | Congenital central hypoventilation syndrome |
| CCM | Cerebral cavernous malformation |
| CDG | Congenital disorder of glycosylation |
| CDGS | Carbohydrate deficient glycoprotein syndrome |
| CDHF | Chronic diastolic heart failure |
| CEP | Congenital erythropoietic porphyria |
| CESD | Cholesteryl ester storage disease |
| CF | Cystic fibrosis |
| CFIDS | Chronic fatigue immune dysfunction syndrome |
| CFS | Chronic fatigue syndrome |
| CGBD | Corticobasal ganglionic degeneration |
| CH | Cluster headache |
| CHARGE syndrome | Coloboma of the eye, heart defects, atresia of the nasal choanae, delayed growth & or development, genital abnormalities, ear abnormalities |
| CHD | Congenital heart disease |
| CHD | Congenital hip dysplasia |
| CHD | Coronary heart disease |
| CHF | Congestive heart failure |
| CIDP | Chronic inflammatory demyelinating polyneuropathy |
| CIPA | Congenital insensitivity to pain with anhidrosis |
| CIP | Congenital insensitivity to pain |
| CJD | Creutzfeldt–Jakob disease |
| CKD | Chronic kidney disease |
| CLOVES syndrome | Congenital lipomatous overgrowth, vascular malformations, epidermal nevi, and skeletal/spinal abnormalities syndrome |
| CML | Chronic myelogenous leukemia |
| CMs | Chiari malformations |
| CMT disease | Charcot–Marie–Tooth disease |
| CMT1A | Charcot–Marie–Tooth disease type 1A |
| CMT1B | Charcot–Marie–Tooth disease type 1B |
| CMT1C | Charcot–Marie–Tooth disease type 1C |
| CMT1D | Charcot–Marie–Tooth disease type 1D |
| CMT1E | Charcot–Marie–Tooth disease type 1E |
| CMT1F | Charcot–Marie–Tooth disease type 1F |
| CMT1X | Charcot–Marie–Tooth disease type 1X |
| CMT2 | Charcot–Marie–Tooth disease type 2 |
| COFS | Cerebro-oculo-facio-skeletal syndrome |
| COLD | Chronic obstructive lung disease |
| COPD | Chronic obstructive pulmonary disease |
| COVID-19 | Coronavirus disease 2019 |
| CP | Cerebral palsy |
| CP/CPPS | Chronic prostatitis/chronic pelvic pain syndrome |
| CPDD | Calcium pyrophosphate deposition disease |
| CPM | Central pontine myelinolysis |
| CPPS | Chronic pelvic pain syndrome (see UCPPS) |
| CRE | Carbapenem-resistant Enterobacteriaceae |
| CRF | Chronic renal failure |
| CRKP | Carbapenem-resistant Klebsiella pneumoniae |
| CRPS | Complex regional pain syndrome |
| CSA | Central sleep apnea |
| CSD | Cat scratch disease |
| CTE | Chronic traumatic encephalopathy |
| CTF | Colorado tick fever |
| CVD | Cardiovascular disease |
| CVI | Chronic venous insufficiency |
| CWD | Chronic wasting disease |

== D ==
| Acronyms | Diseases and disorders |
|---|---|
| DAS | Developmental apraxia of speech |
| DBA | Diamond–Blackfan anemia |
| DBMD | Duchenne–Becker muscular dystrophy |
| DD | Developmental disability |
| DEF | Deaf |
| DF | Dengue fever |
| DH | Developmentally handicapped |
| DHF | Dengue hemorrhagic fever |
| DHF | Diastolic heart failure |
| DHPR | Dihydropteridine reductase deficiency |
| DI | Diabetes insipidus |
| DIC | Disseminated intravascular coagulation |
| DID | Dissociative Identity Disorder |
| DiG | DiGeorge syndrome |
| DISH | Diffuse idiopathic skeletal hyperostosis |
| DJD | Degenerative joint disease |
| DLB | Dementia with Lewy bodies |
| DM | Diabetes mellitus |
| DMD | Duchenne muscular dystrophy |
| DNSD | dissociative neurological symptom disorder |
| DP | Doss porphyria/ALA dehydratase deficiency/Plumboporphyria (the disease is known by multiple names) |
| DPD | Dependent personality disorder |
| DPT | Diphtheria, pertussis, tetanus |
| DRSP disease | Drug-resistant Streptococcus pneumoniae disease |
| DS | Down syndrome |
| DSPS | Delayed sleep phase syndrome |
| DTs | Delirium tremens |
| DVD | Developmental verbal dyspraxia |
| DVT | Deep vein thrombosis |

== E ==
| Acronyms | Diseases and disorders |
|---|---|
| ED | Emotionally disturbed |
| ED | Erectile dysfunction |
| EDS | Ehlers–Danlos syndrome |
| EDS | Excessive daytime sleepiness |
| EEE | Eastern equine encephalitis |
| EHK | Epidermolytic hyperkeratosis |
| EMH | Educable mentally handicapped |
| EMR | Educable mentally retarded |
| ENS | Epidermal nevus syndrome |
| EOAD | Early-onset Alzheimer's disease |
| EPM | Extrapontine myelinolysis (see central pontine myelinolysis) |
| EPP | Erythropoietic protoporphyria |
| ESRD | End-stage renal disease |
| ESS | Empty sella syndrome |
| EVD | Ebola Virus Disease |

== F ==
| Acronyms | Diseases and disorders |
|---|---|
| FAE | Fetal alcohol effects |
| FAS | Fetal alcohol syndrome |
| FASDs | Fetal alcohol spectrum disorders |
| FFI | Fatal familial insomnia |
| FMA | Focal muscular atrophies |
| FMD | Fibromuscular dysplasia |
| FMS | Fibromyalgia syndrome |
| FNSD | Functional neurological symptom disorder |
| FSP | Familial spastic paraparesis |
| FTD | Frontotemporal dementia |
| FUO | Fever of unknown origin |
| FVS | Fetal valproate syndrome |
| Fx | Fracture |
| FXS | Fragile X syndrome |

== G ==
| Acronyms | Diseases and disorders |
|---|---|
| GAD | Generalized anxiety disorder |
| GAN | Giant axonal neuropathy |
| GAS disease | Group A Streptococcal disease |
| GAVE | Gastric antral vascular ectasia (see Watermelon stomach) |
| GBS | Guillain–Barré syndrome |
| GBS disease | Group B Streptococcal disease |
| GCE | Glycine encephalopathy |
| GD | Gestational diabetes |
| GERD | Gastroesophageal reflux disease |
| GI | Gastrointestinal |
| GIB | Gastrointestinal bleeding |
| GN | Glossopharyngeal neuralgia |
| GORD | Gastro-oesophageal reflux disease |
| GSS disease | Gerstmann–Sträussler–Scheinker disease |
| GT/LD | Gifted and learning disabled |
| GVHD | Graft-versus-host disease |
| GWD | Guinea worm disease |

== H ==
| Acronyms | Diseases and disorders |
|---|---|
| H1N1 flu | Hemagglutinin Type 1 and Neuraminidase Type 1 influenza |
| HAS | Holmes–Adie syndrome |
| HCP | Hereditary coproporphyria |
| HD | Huntington's disease |
| HDL2 | Huntington's disease–like 2 |
| HELLP syndrome | Hemolytic anemia, elevated liver enzymes and low platelet count syndrome |
| HeV Infection | Hendra virus infection |
| HF | Heart failure |
| HFA | High-functioning autism |
| HFMD | Hand, foot, and mouth disease |
| HFRS | Hemorrhagic fever with renal syndrome |
| HI | Hearing impaired |
| HiB disease | Haemophilus influenzae type B disease |
| HIBM | Hereditary inclusion body myopathy |
| HMSN Type III | Hereditary motor and sensory polyneuropathy type III (see Dejerine–Sottas syndrome) |
| HOH | Hard of hearing |
| HTN | Hypertension |
| HPRT deficiency | Hypoxanthine-guanine phosphoribosyl transferase deficiency |
| HPD | Histrionic personality disorder |
| HPS | Hantavirus pulmonary syndrome |
| HPV Infection | Human papillomavirus infection |
| HSP | Hereditary spastic paraplegia |

== I ==
| Acronyms | Diseases and disorders |
|---|---|
| IAPA | Influenza-associated pulmonary aspergillosis |
| IBD | Inflammatory bowel disease |
| IBIDS syndrome | Ichthyosis, brittle hair, intellectual impairment, decreased fertility, and short stature syndrome |
| IBM | Inclusion body myositis |
| IBS | Ichthyosis bullosa of Siemens |
| IBS | Irritable bowel syndrome |
| IC/PBS | Interstitial cystitis/painful bladder syndrome |
| ICF syndrome | Immunodeficiency, centromere instability and facial anomalies syndrome |
| ID | Infectious disease |
| IED | Intermittent explosive disorder |
| IFAP syndrome | Ichthyosis follicularis, alopecia, and photophobia syndrome |
| IHA | Idiopathic hyperaldosteronism |
| INAD | Infantile neuroaxonal dystrophy |
| IP | Incontinentia pigmenti |
| IRD | Infantile Refsum disease |
| IS | Infantile spasm |
| ITP | Idiopathic thrombocytopenic purpura |

== J ==
| Acronyms | Diseases and disorders |
|---|---|
| JAS | Juvenile ankylosing spondylitis |
| JBS | Johanson–Blizzard syndrome |
| JE | Japanese encephalitis |
| JHD | Juvenile Huntington's disease |
| JMML | Juvenile myelomonocytic leukemia |
| JODM | Juvenile onset diabetes mellitus |
| JPA | Juvenile pilocytic astrocytoma |
| JRA | Juvenile rheumatoid arthritis |
| JWS | Jackson–Weiss syndrome |

== K ==
| Acronyms | Diseases and disorders |
|---|---|
| KC | Keratoconus |
| KFD | Kyasanur Forest disease |
| KS | Kaposi's sarcoma |
| KS | Kawasaki syndrome |
| KSS | Kearns–Sayre syndrome |
| KTS | Klippel–Trénaunay syndrome |
| KTW Syndrome | Klippel–Trénaunay–Weber syndrome |

== L ==
| Acronyms | Diseases and disorders |
|---|---|
| LBD | Lewy body dementia |
| LCM | Lymphocytic choriomeningitis |
| LD(s) | Learning disabilities/difficulties/differences/disorder |
| LD | Legionnaires' disease |
| LEMS | Lambert–Eaton myasthenic syndrome |
| LFA | Low-functioning autism |
| LGV | Lymphogranuloma venereum |
| LKS | Landau–Kleffner syndrome |
| LNS | Lesch–Nyhan syndrome |
| LP | Lipoid proteinosis |
| LP | Little person/people (see dwarfism) |
| LPR | Laryngopharyngeal Reflux |
| LUHF | Lujo Hemorrhagic Fever |

== M ==
| Acronyms | Diseases and disorders |
|---|---|
| MAC | Mycobacterium avium complex |
| MBD | Minimal brain dysfunction |
| MCS | Multiple chemical sensitivities |
| MD | Muscular dystrophy |
| MDS | Myoclonic dystonia |
| MDD | Major depressive disorder |
| MDR TB | Multi-drug-resistant tuberculosis |
| ME | Myalgic Encephalomyelitis |
| ME/CFS | Myalgic encephalomyelitis/chronic fatigue syndrome |
| MERS | Middle East respiratory syndrome |
| MFS | Marfan syndrome |
| MI | Myocardial infarction |
| MID | Multi-infarct dementia |
| MIS | Multisystem Inflammatory Syndrome |
| MIS-A | Multisystem Inflammatory Syndrome in adults |
| MIS-C | Multisystem Inflammatory Syndrome in children |
| MJD | Machado-Joseph disease |
| ML | mucolipidoses |
| MLD | Metachromatic leukodystrophy |
| MMA | Monomelic amyotrophy |
| MMR | Measles, mumps, rubella |
| MMRV | Measles, mumps, rubella, varicella |
| MND | Motor neuron disease |
| MODY | Maturity-onset diabetes of the young |
| MOH | Medication overuse headaches |
| MPD | Myeloproliferative disorders |
| MPS I | Mucopolysaccharoidosis type I (see Hurler syndrome) |
| MPS II | Mucopolysaccharoidosis type II (see Hunter syndrome) |
| MPS III | Mucopolysaccharoidosis type III (see Sanfilippo syndrome) |
| MPS IV | Mucopolysaccharoidosis type IV (see Morquio syndrome) |
| MPS VI | Mucopolysaccharoidosis type VI (see Maroteaux–Lamy syndrome) |
| MPS VII | Mucopolysaccharoidosis type VII (see Sly syndrome) |
| MPX | Monkeypox |
| MR/DD | Mentally retarded/developmentally disabled |
| MS | Multiple sclerosis |
| MSA | Multiple system atrophy |
| MSDD | Multi-sensory developmental delays |

== N ==
| Acronyms | Diseases and disorders |
|---|---|
| NAS | Neonatal abstinence syndrome |
| NBIA | Neurodegeneration with brain iron accumulation |
| NCIP | Novel coronavirus-infected pneumonia |
| NCL | Neuronal ceroid lipofuscinosis |
| NF1 | Neurofibromatosis type 1 |
| NF2 | Neurofibromatosis type 2 |
| NKH | Nonketotic hyperglycinemia |
| NLD | Nonverbal learning disability |
| NMDs | Neuronal migration disorders |
| NMO | Neuromyelitis optica |
| NMS | Neuroleptic malignant syndrome |
| NP | Niemann–Pick disease |
| NPC1 | Niemann–Pick disease, type C1 |
| NPD | Narcissistic personality disorder |
| NPH | Normal pressure hydrocephalus |
| NTD | Neural tube defect |
| NTDs | Neural tube defects |
| NTDs | Neglected tropical diseases |

== O ==
| Acronyms | Diseases and disorders |
|---|---|
| OA | Osteoarthritis |
| OCD | Obsessive-compulsive disorder |
| OCPD | Obsessive-compulsive personality disorder |
| ODD | Oppositional defiant disorder |
| OHF | Omsk hemorrhagic fever |
| OMA | Oculomotor apraxia |
| ON | Osteonecrosis |
| OPC | Oropharyngeal candidiasis |
| OPCA | Olivopontocerebellar atrophy |
| OSA | Obstructive sleep apnea |
| OSDD | Other Specified Dissociative Disorder |

== P ==
| Acronyms | Diseases and disorders |
|---|---|
| PBC | Primary biliary cirrhosis |
| PBD | Peroxisome biogenesis disorders |
| PCA | Posterior cortical atrophy |
| PCT | Porphyria cutanea tarda |
| PD | Parkinson's disease |
| PDD | Parkinson's disease dementia |
| PDD | Pervasive developmental disorder |
| PDD-NOS | Pervasive developmental disorder, not otherwise specified |
| PDD/NOS | Pervasive developmental disorder, not otherwise specified |
| PDS | Pokkuri Death Syndrome |
| PE | Pulmonary embolism |
| PKAN | Panthothenate kinase-associated neurodegeneration |
| PKU | Phenylketonuria |
| PLMD | Periodic limb movement disorder |
| PLS | Primary lateral sclerosis |
| PMD | Pelizaeus–Merzbacher disease |
| PML | Progressive multifocal leukoencephalopathy |
| PMOS | Polyendocrine metabolic ovarian syndrome |
| PMS | Premenstrual syndrome |
| POTS | Postural orthostatic tachycardia syndrome |
| PPD | Paranoid personality disorder |
| PPMA | Post-polio progressive muscular atrophy |
| PPS | Post-polio syndrome |
| PSC | Primary sclerosing cholangitis |
| PSP | Progressive supranuclear palsy |
| PTSD | Post-traumatic stress disorder |
| PVL | Periventricular leukomalacia |
| PW | Port-wine stain |

== Q ==
| Acronyms | Diseases and disorders |
|---|---|
| Q fever | Query fever |
| QMS | Qazi–Markouizos syndrome |
| QPD | Qualitative platelet defect |
| QPD | Quebec platelet disorder |
| QPS | Quebec platelet syndrome |
| QTT | Queensland tick typhus |

== R ==
| Acronyms | Diseases and disorders |
|---|---|
| RA | Rheumatoid arthritis |
| RAD | Reactive airway disease |
| RIND | Reversible ischemic neurologic deficit |
| RLF | Retrolental fibroplasia |
| RLS | Restless legs syndrome |
| RMDs | Repetitive motion disorders |
| ROP | Retinopathy of prematurity |
| RS | Reye's syndrome |
| RSD | Reflex sympathetic dystrophy |
| RTI | Respiratory tract infection |
| RVF | Rift Valley fever |

== S ==
| Acronyms | Diseases and disorders |
|---|---|
| SADS | Sudden arrhythmic death syndrome |
| SARS | Severe acute respiratory syndrome |
| SB | Spina bifida |
| SBMD | Sensory-based motor disorder |
| SBS | Shaken baby syndrome |
| SC | Sydenham chorea |
| SD | Saint Vitus's dance (see Sydenham chorea) |
| SDD | Sensory discrimination disorder |
| SDS | Sudden death syndrome |
| SHF | Systolic heart failure |
| SIDS | Sudden infant death syndrome |
| SIRS | Systemic inflammatory response syndrome |
| SIS | Shaken infant syndrome |
| SjD | Sjögren's disease |
| SJS | Stevens–Johnson syndrome |
| SLE | Systemic lupus erythematosus |
| SM | Selective Mutism |
| SMA | Spinal muscular atrophy |
| SMD | Sensory modulation disorder |
| SMEI | Severe myoclonic epilepsy of infancy |
| SMS | Smith–Magenis syndrome |
| SOD | Septo-optic dysplasia |
| SPD | Sensory processing disorder, schizoid personality disorder |
| SPS | Stiff person syndrome |
| SSPE | Subacute sclerosing panencephalitis |
| STEMI | ST-elevation myocardial infarction |
| STD | Sexually transmitted disease |
| STI | Sexually transmitted infection |
| STPD | Schizotypal personality disorder |
| SUDEP | Sudden unexpected death in epilepsy |
| SUNCT | Short-lasting unilateral neuralgiform headache with conjunctival injection and tearing |
| SUNDS | Sudden unexplained nocturnal death syndrome |
| SWS | Sturge–Weber syndrome |
| SLOS | Smith-Lemli-Opitz syndrome |

== T ==
| Acronyms | Diseases and disorders |
|---|---|
| TAC | Trigeminal autonomic cephalalgia |
| TAO | Thromboangiitis obliterans |
| TB | Tuberculosis |
| TBI | Traumatic brain injury |
| TCS | Tethered cord syndrome |
| TEF | Tracheoesophageal fistula |
| TIA | Transient ischemic attack |
| TMH | Trainable mentally handicapped |
| TMJ/TMD | Temporomandibular joint disorder |
| TMR | Trainable mentally retarded |
| TN | Trigeminal Neuralgia |
| TOS | Thoracic outlet syndrome |
| TS | Tourette syndrome |
| TS | Tuberous sclerosis |
| TSC | Tuberous sclerosis |
| TSEs | Transmissible spongiform encephalopathies |
| TSP | Tropical spastic paraparesis |
| TTH | Tension type headache |
| TTP | Thrombotic thrombocytopenic purpura |

== U ==
| Acronyms | Diseases and disorders |
|---|---|
| UCPPS | Urologic Chronic Pelvic Pain Syndrome (IC/BPS + CP/CPPS) |
| UCD | Unicentric Castleman disease |
| UDA | Urticaria-deafness-amyloidosis |
| UFS | Urofacial syndrome |
| USP7-related diseases | Ubiquitin specific protease 7-related diseases |
| UTI | Urinary tract infection |
| UC | Ulcerative colitis |
| URI | Upper respiratory infection |

== V ==
| Acronyms | Diseases and disorders |
|---|---|
| VACTERL-H | Vertebral abnormalities, Anal atresia, Cardiac defects, Tracheoesophageal fistula, Esophageal atresia, Renal and radial abnormalities, Limb abnormalities with Hydrocephalus |
| VAED | Vaccine-associated enhanced disease |
| VCFS | Velo cardio facial syndrome |
| vCJD | variant Creutzfeldt–Jakob disease |
| VD | Vascular dementia |
| VD | Venereal disease |
| VHF | Viral hemorrhagic fever |
| VHL | Von Hippel–Lindau disease |
| VKC | Vernal keratoconjunctivitis |
| VKH | Vogt–Koyanagi–Harada disease |
| VOD | veno-occlusive disease |
| VP | Variegate porphyria |
| VSD | Ventricular septal defect |
| VVC | Vulvovaginal candidiasis |
| VWD | Von Willebrand disease |
| VWM disease | Vanishing white matter disease |

== W ==
| Acronyms | Diseases and disorders |
|---|---|
| WAGR syndrome | Wilms tumor, aniridia, genitourinary anomalies, and mental retardation syndrome |
| WD | Wilson's disease |
| WEE | Western equine encephalitis |
| WS | Williams syndrome |
| WS4 | Waardenburg syndrome type 4 |

== X ==
| Acronyms | Diseases and disorders |
|---|---|
| X-ALD | X-linked adrenoleukodystrophy |
| X-CALD | X-linked cerebral adrenoleukodystrophy |
| XDH and AOX dual deficiency | Xanthine dehydrogenase and aldehyde oxidase combined deficiency |
| XDH deficiency | Xanthine dehydrogenase deficiency |
| XDP | X-linked dystonia-parkinsonism |
| XDR TB | Extensively drug-resistant tuberculosis |
| XHED | X-linked hypohidrotic ectodermal dysplasia |
| XLMTM | X-linked myotubular myopathy |
| XLOS | X-linked Opitz G/BBB syndrome |
| XLP syndrome | X-linked lymphoproliferative syndrome (see Duncan Disease) |
| XLSA | X-linked sideroblastic anemia |
| XMEA | X-linked myopathy with excessive autophagy |
| XMEN | X-linked immunodeficiency with magnesium defect, Epstein-Barr virus infection and neoplasia |
| XP | Xeroderma pigmentosa |
| XSCID | X-linked severe combined immunodeficiency |
| XXX syndrome | Triple X syndrome |

== Y ==
| Acronyms | Diseases and disorders |
|---|---|
| YF | Yellow Fever |
| YNS | Yellow nail syndrome |
| YOAD | younger-onset Alzheimer's disease |
| YSS | Young–Simpson syndrome |
| YVS | Yunis–Varon syndrome |
| YY syndrome | Double Y syndrome |

== Z ==
| Acronyms | Diseases and disorders |
|---|---|
| ZAP-70 deficiency | Zeta-associated-protein 70 deficiency |
| ZBLS | Zadik–Barak–Levin syndrome |
| ZES | Zollinger–Ellison syndrome |
| ZLS | Zimmermann–Laband syndrome |
| ZS | Zellweger syndrome |
| ZSD | Zellweger spectrum disorders |
| ZSS | Zellweger syndrome spectrum |
| ZTTK syndrome | Zhu–Tokita–Takenouchi–Kim syndrome |

== See also ==
- Acronyms in healthcare
- List of medical abbreviations: Overview
- List of medical abbreviations: Latin abbreviations
- List of abbreviations for medical organisations and personnel
- List of abbreviations used in medical prescriptions
- List of optometric abbreviations
