= Audiology and hearing health professionals in Brazil =

In Brazil, audiology grew out of the field of ear nose and throat (ENT) medical field. According to Bevilacqua et al. (2008), the majority of audiologists in Brazil work at private institutions, including private medical practices and dedicated speech and hearing clinics. They are also employed in public institutions, such as community clinics, elementary schools, colleges, and universities. Audiologists perform diagnostic evaluations of auditory and vestibular disorders, select and fit hearing aids, and provide aural rehabilitation. They may also assist with workers’ health programs, dispense hearing aids, and aural rehabilitation in the public sector.

Despite having the largest economy in South America or Central America, Brazil is still considered a developing country due to its low gross domestic product, or GDP, per capita, low living standards, high infant mortality rate and other factors. "With regard to hearing health, the Brazilian government established the national policy for giving attention to hearing health in 2004, in which the Ministry of Health, considering the social magnitude of hearing impairment in the Brazilian population and its consequences, presented the proposal to structure a network of services set up by regions and in hierarchy that aims to be implemented in all federative units of Brazil, with integrated actions to promote ear health, hearing impairment prevention, treatment and rehabilitation organized and managed by the National Health System, Sistema Único de Saúde (SUS), in Portuguese.,"

== Hearing healthcare professional qualifications ==
According to Bevilacqua et al. (2008), "the entry level for the profession remains the baccalaureate degree. The undergraduate course in speech pathology and audiology (fonoaudiologia) involves a double major with coursework in both speech-language pathology and audiology. Classes include the basic sciences, anatomy and physiology, human development, linguistics, phonetics, psychology, the nature and process of audition and balance, normal and abnormal communication development, and supervised clinical practicum. A double license is granted to graduates of this four-year course, and they are free to work in any area of the field. Graduates must also comply with federal regulatory (licensure) standards in order to practice". According to the Brazilian Federal Speech Language Pathology and Audiology Council (Conselho Federal de Fonoaudiologia, 2018), there are currently 117 undergraduate courses in speech-language pathology and audiology in Brazil, with approximately 44.000 professionals in all country. It is at graduate level that different courses are offered in the four areas of specialization defined by the Speech-Language Pathology and Audiology Council (audiology, language, oral motor disorders, and voice). There are several options for degrees and coursework. Some courses offer a 500-hour course of study which provides advanced clinical training focused in one of the four areas of specialization, and graduates receive the title ‘Specialist’. In addition, a few universities offer masters and doctoral degree courses designed to provide the necessary training for those aiming at a career in research and education. Currently, there are 32 specialization courses and eight graduate courses in communication disorders throughout Brazil."

== Universal newborn hearing screening ==
Brazil is one of the few developing countries that provides universal newborn hearing screenings. Brazil has one of the largest and oldest newborn hearing screening programs (NHSP) in Latin America with over 246 screening sites across 24 of the 27 Brazilian states. According to Cavalcanti & Guerra (2012), the first NHSP dates back to 1988 in São Paulo. Originally, only babies with risk factors were screened for hearing loss. Despite efforts being made to implement newborn hearing screening throughout Brazil, 77% of the UNHS programs are in the Southern, which is the more industrialized part of the country. In 2004, Brazil established a national policy for hearing health which included diagnostic procedures, hearing aids and cochlear implants being provided to the pediatric population free of charge and rehabilitation services available for infants identified with hearing loss at an early age. Newborn hearing screening is one of the leading contributors for engaging subsequent diagnostic, treatment and rehabilitation actions. One example of a universal newborn hearing screenings are at the Public Hospital of Bauru, Sa˜o Paulo state, Brazil. The screening method this location uses is a two-stage screening consisting of transient otoacoustic emissions (TOAE), performed by an audiologist. If the newborn does not pass the first part of the screening then they are referred to Audiology and Speech Pathology Clinic at the University of São Paulo, campus of Bauru for diagnostic follow-up testing and intervention. Bevilacqua et al., (2010) reviewed the average cost of the newborn hearing screening in Brazil and found the cost of hearing screening was equivalent to US$7.00 and the annual cost of the universal newborn hearing screening program was equivalent to US$26,940.47.

== Statistics ==
Country	GNI $Int PPP	Pop. (000s)	Auds	Auds/Mil. Pop.	ENTs	ENTs/Mil. Pop.	Aud Phys	Aud Tech	H/A Tech	SLT	TOD
Brazil	8800	178470	25600*	143	6000	34	0	0	10	1000	27500

GNI $Int PPP: Per Capita Gross National Income in international dollars; Pop. (000s): Population (000s); Auds: Total Audiologists; Auds/Mil. Pop: Audiologists per million people; ENTs: Total ENT surgeons; ENTs/Mil. Pop: ENT surgeons per million people; Aud Phys: Audiological Physicians; Aud Techs: Audiological Technicians; SLT: Speech-Language Therapists; TOD: Teachers of the Deaf; * indicates combined Speech-Language-Hearing qualification
