= C10H13N3O2 =

The molecular formula C_{10}H_{13}N_{3}O_{2} (molar mass: 207.23 g/mol, exact mass: 207.1008 u) may refer to:

- Guanoxan
- Histamine glutarimide
- para-Nitrophenylpiperazine
- NNK (nicotine-derived nitrosamine ketone)
