= Audiology and hearing health professionals in India =

Audiology and hearing health professionals in India is made up of Indian healthcare professional that focus on audiological and hearing problems.

== Hearing healthcare professional qualifications ==
According to Manchaiah et al. (2010), "Audiological services in India are available in both the public and private sectors. Both sectors offer services such as hearing assessment, selection and fitting of hearing aids, and aural rehabilitation. Some of the centres have successful cochlear implantation programmes, however, the services in some of the specialised audiology areas like vestibular assessment and rehabilitation, assessment and management of auditory processing disorders, and tinnitus rehabilitation are limited. Services provided in the public sector are funded by the Department of Health or the State Governments which usually offer free services mainly at district level hospitals, educational institutes and district health rehabilitation centres. There is also provision for free body level hearing aids and solar driven rechargeable batteries through the scheme ‘Assistance to Disabled Persons for Purchase (ADIP)’ funded by the Ministry of Social Justice and Empowerment. The paediatric population has a provision of subsidised BTE hearing aids under the National Program for Prevention and Control of Deafness (NPPCD) scheme. Private audiology centres in India are generally equipped with all the necessary diagnostic instruments. Their main focus of work is in hearing aid dispensing. However, these clinics or institutes are not easily accessible to people living in rural settings as most of them are based in urban locations."

== Universal newborn hearing screening ==
India is one of the few developing countries with a universal newborn hearing screening program (NHSP). Despite India's exceptionally large population and high annual birth rate (25 babies per 1000), India has a well-developing health care system and well-establish immunization programme. In 2006, according to the World Health Organization (WHO), the National Programme for Prevention and Control of Deafness was launched in India. The National Programme for Prevention and Control of Deafness is currently running in over 60 districts across India and aims to identify babies with bilateral severe-profound hearing loss by 6 months of age and intervene or initiate rehabilitation by 9 months of age. Under this programme, India follows a two-stage protocol for newborn hearing screening. In an institution-based screening, the programme's goal is to screen every baby born in a hospital or admitted soon after birth using otoacoustic emissions (OAEs), specifically transient evoked otoacoustic emissions (TEOAEs). If a baby does not pass, then they are re-tested in a month. If the baby does not pass at the re-screen, then they are referred for auditory brainstem response (ABR) testing at the tertiary-level centers. At community-based screenings, the programme's goal is to screen babies who are not born in hospitals. This screening should be carried out using a questionnaire and behavioral testing and is performed when the baby is immunized at 6 weeks of age or older. A trained health care worker at sub center administers immunization and performs the hearing screening. This protocol is repeated at every immunization. If a baby does not pass the screening, then they are referred for an OAE screening at the district hospital. If they do not pass the OAE screening, then they are sent for an ABR evaluation. Once a baby is identified with hearing loss, they are referred for hearing aid fitting and rehabilitation at the district hospital.

== Statistics ==
Country	GNI $Int PPP	Pop. (000s)	Auds	Auds/Mil. Pop.	ENTs	ENTs/Mil. Pop.	Aud Phys	Aud Tech	H/A Tech	SLT	TOD
India	1568	1065462	1000	1	N/A	N/A	N/A	N/A	N/A	700	N/A

GNI $Int PPP: Per Capita Gross National Income in international dollars; Pop. (000s): Population (000s); Auds: Total Audiologists; Auds/Mil. Pop: Audiologists per million people; ENTs: Total ENT surgeons; ENTs/Mil. Pop: ENT surgeons per million people; Aud Phys: Audiological Physicians; Aud Techs: Audiological Technicians; SLT: Speech-Language Therapists; TOD: Teachers of the Deaf

== Organizations and charities ==
Over the past few years, charities and non-governmental organizations have become involved in improving ear and hearing healthcare services in India. Examples of charities and organizations include:

- Aural Education for the Hearing Impaired (AURED),
- Development Education Empowerment for the Disadvantaged in Society (DEEDS),
- Deafchild India,
- Hearing International – India,
- Indian Deaf Children's Society,
- I Hear Foundation,
- Research Education & Audiological Development Society (READS),
- Rotary International,
- Society to Aid the Hearing Impaired (SAHI),
- Sound of Infinity by Anju Sharma
- Vani Pradan Kendra.
