= Glossary of communication disorders =

This is a glossary of medical terms related to communication disorders which are psychological or medical conditions that could have the potential to affect the ways in which individuals can hear, listen, understand, speak and respond to others.

== A ==
Acoustic neuroma
Tumor, usually benign, which may develop on the hearing and balance nerves and can cause gradual hearing loss, tinnitus, and/or dizziness. (sometimes called vestibular schwannoma). Also see Neurofibromatosis Type 2.
Acquired deafness
Loss of hearing that occurs or develops some time during the lifespan but is not present at birth.
Alport syndrome
Hereditary condition characterized by kidney disease, sensorineural hearing loss, and sometimes eye defects.
American Sign Language (ASL)
Manual language with its own syntax and grammar, used primarily by people who are deaf.
Aphasia
Total or partial loss of the ability to use or understand language; usually caused by stroke, brain disease, or injury.
Aphonia
Complete loss of voice.
Apraxia
Inability to execute a voluntary movement despite being able to demonstrate normal muscle function.
Articulation disorder
Inability to correctly produce speech sounds (phonemes) because of imprecise placement, timing, pressure, speed, or flow of movement of the lips, tongue, or throat.
Assistive devices
Technical tools and devices such as alphabet boards, text telephones, or text-to-speech conversion software used to aid individuals who have communication disorders perform actions, tasks, and activities.
Audiologist
Health care professional who is trained to evaluate hearing loss and related disorders, including balance (vestibular) disorders and tinnitus, and to rehabilitate individuals with hearing loss and related disorders. An audiologist uses a variety of tests and procedures to assess hearing and balance function and to fit and dispense hearing aids and other assistive devices for hearing.
Auditory Brainstem Response test (ABR test)
A test for brain functioning in comatose, unresponsive, etc., patients, and for hearing in infants and young children; involves attaching electrodes to the head to record electrical activity from the hearing nerve and other parts of the brain.
Auditory nerve
Eighth cranial nerve that connects the inner ear to the brainstem and is responsible for hearing and balance.
Auditory perception
Ability to identify, interpret, and attach meaning to sound.
Auditory prosthesis
Device that substitutes or enhances the ability to hear.
Augmentative devices
Tools that help individuals with limited or absent speech to communicate, such as communication boards, pictographs (symbols that look like the things they represent), or ideographs (symbols representing ideas).
Aural rehabilitation
Techniques used with people who are hearing impaired to improve their ability to speak and communicate.
Autoimmune deafness
Individual's immune system produces abnormal antibodies that react against the body's healthy tissues.
Autism
Can refer to autistic disorder a psychiatric syndrome featuring restricted and repetitive behaviors, and impaired social interaction and communication; or the group of syndromes to which autistic disorder belongs - the autism spectrum disorders.

== B ==
Babbling
Prelinguistic sound play by infants; characterized by labial consonants(/b/p/m/).
Balance
Biological system that enables individuals to know where their bodies are in the environment and to maintain a desired position. Normal balance depends on information from the labyrinth in the inner ear, from other senses such as sight and touch, and from muscle movement.
Balance disorder
Disruption in the labyrinth, the inner ear organ that controls the balance system, which allows individuals to know where their bodies are in the environment. The labyrinth works with other systems in the body, such as the visual and skeletal systems, to maintain posture.
Barotrauma
Injury to the middle ear caused by a reduction of air pressure.
Benign paroxysmal positional vertigo (BPPV)
Balance disorder that results in sudden onset of dizziness, spinning, or vertigo when moving the head.
Brainstem implant
Auditory prosthesis that bypasses the cochlea and auditory nerve. This type of implant helps individuals who cannot benefit from a cochlear implant because the auditory nerves are not working.

== C ==
Captioning
Text display of spoken words, presented on a television or a movie screen, that allows a deaf or hard-of-hearing viewer to follow the dialogue and the action of a program simultaneously.
Central auditory processing disorder
Inability to differentiate, recognize, or understand sounds; hearing and intelligence are normal.
Chemosensory disorders
Diseases or problems associated with the sense of smell or the sense of taste.
Cholesteatoma
Accumulation of dead cells in the middle ear, caused by repeated middle ear infections.
Cochlea
Snail-shaped structure in the inner ear that contains the organ of hearing.
Cochlear implant
Medical device that bypasses damaged structures in the inner ear and directly stimulates the auditory nerve, allowing some deaf individuals to learn to hear and interpret sounds and speech.
Cognition
Thinking skills that include perception, memory, awareness, reasoning, judgment, intellect, and imagination.
Conductive hearing impairment
Hearing loss caused by dysfunction of the outer or middle ear.
Cued speech
Method of communication that combines speech reading with a system of hand-shapes placed near the mouth to help deaf or hard-of-hearing individuals differentiate words that look similar on the lips (e.g., bunch vs. punch) or are hidden (e.g., gag).
Cytomegalovirus (Congenital)
One group of herpes viruses that infects humans and can cause a variety of clinical symptoms, including deafness or hearing impairment; infection with the virus may be either before or after birth.

== D ==
Decibel
Unit that measures the intensity or loudness of sound.
Developmental language disorder
A neurodevelopmental disorder, causing persistent difficulty with language, affecting about 7–9% of the population.
Developmental verbal dyspraxia
In individuals with normal muscle tone and speech muscle coordination, partial loss of the ability to consistently pronounce words.
Dizziness
Physical unsteadiness, imbalance, and lightheadedness associated with balance disorders.
Dysarthria
Group of speech disorders caused by disturbances in the strength or coordination of the muscles of the speech mechanism as a result of damage to the brain or nerves.
Dysequilibrium
Any disturbance of balance.
Dysfluency
Disruption in the smooth flow or expression of speech.
Dysgeusia
Distortion or absence of the sense of taste.
Dyslexia
Learning disability characterized by reading difficulties. Some individuals may also have difficulty writing, spelling, or working with numbers.
Dysosmia
Distortion or absence of the sense of smell.
Dysphagia
Difficulty swallowing.
Dysphonia
Any impairment of the voice or speaking ability.
Dystonia
Abnormal muscle tone of one or more muscles.

== E ==
Ear infection
Presence and growth of bacteria or viruses in the ear.
Earwax
Yellow secretion from glands in the outer ear (cerumen) that keeps the skin of the ear dry and protected from infection.
Echolalia
Repeating what one has already said or heard; often associated with Autism Spectrum Disorder.
Endolymph
Fluid in the labyrinth (the organ of balance located in the inner ear that consists of three semicircular canals and the vestibule).

== G ==
Grammar
System of rules used by speakers of a language to produce and understand spoken language.
Gustation
Act or sensation of tasting.
Glaucoma
Disease related to eyes due to increase in IOP(intraorbicular pressure)

== H ==
Hair cells
Sensory cells of the inner ear, which are topped with hair-like structures, the stereocilia, and which transform the mechanical energy of sound waves into nerve impulses.
Haptic sense
Sense of physical contact or touch.
Haptometer
Instrument for measuring sensitivity to touch.
Hearing
Series of events in which sound waves in the air are converted to electrical signals, which are sent as nerve impulses to the brain, where they are interpreted.
Hearing aid
Electronic device that brings amplified sound to the ear. A hearing aid usually consists of a microphone, amplifier, and receiver.
Hearing disorder
Disruption in the normal hearing process that may occur in outer, middle, or inner ear, whereby sound waves are not conducted to the inner ear, converted to electrical signals and/or nerve impulses are not transmitted to the brain to be interpreted.
Hereditary hearing impairment
Hearing loss passed down through generations of a family.
Hoarseness
Abnormally rough or harsh-sounding voice caused by vocal abuse and other disorders such as gastroesophageal reflux, thyroid problems, or trauma to the larynx (voice box).
Hyper neurotic diafragma contractions
The hiccups
Hypogeusia
Diminished sensitivity to taste.
Hyposmia
Diminished sensitivity to smell.

== I ==
Inflection
Alterations in the pitch and prosody of spoken language to convey meaning.
Inner ear
Part of the ear that contains both the organ of hearing (the cochlea) and the organ of balance (the labyrinth).
Intensity
Refers to the energy flow per unit area (audiology).

== K ==
Kallmann's syndrome
Disorder that can include several characteristics such as absence of the sense of smell and decreased functional activity of the gonads (organs that produce sex cells), affecting growth and sexual development.

== L ==
Labyrinth
Organ of balance located in the inner ear. The labyrinth consists of three semicircular canals and the vestibule.
Labyrinthine hydrops
Excessive fluid in the organ of balance (labyrinth); can cause pressure or fullness in the ears, hearing loss, dizziness, and loss of balance.
Labyrinthitis
Viral or bacterial infection or inflammation of the inner ear that can cause dizziness, loss of balance, and temporary hearing loss.
Landau-Kleffner syndrome
Childhood disorder of unknown origin which often extends into adulthood and can be identified by gradual or sudden loss of the ability to understand and use spoken language.
Language
System for communicating ideas and feelings using sounds, gestures, signs, or marks.
Language disorders
Any of a number of problems with verbal communication and the ability to use or understand a symbol system for communication.
Laryngeal neoplasms
Abnormal growths in the larynx (voice box) that can be cancerous or noncancerous.
Laryngeal nodules
Noncancerous, callous-like growths on the inner parts of the vocal folds (vocal cords); usually caused by vocal abuse or misuse.
Laryngeal paralysis
Loss of function or feeling of one or both of the vocal folds caused by injury or disease to the nerves of the larynx.
Laryngectomy
Surgery to remove part or all of the larynx (voice box).
Laryngitis
Hoarse voice or the complete loss of the voice because of irritation to the vocal folds (vocal cords).
Laryngoplasty
Laryngeal framework surgery of a paralysed vocal cord to help strengthen the voice - a window in the thyroid cartilage is created and an implant is inserted into the para-glottic space via an open approach.
Larynx
Valve structure between the trachea (windpipe) and the pharynx (the upper throat) that is the primary organ of voice production.
Learning disabilities
Childhood disorders characterized by difficulty with certain skills such as reading or writing in individuals with normal intelligence.

== M ==
Mastoid
Back portion of the temporal bone that contains the inner ear.
Mastoid surgery
Surgical procedure to remove infection from the mastoid bone.
Meige syndrome
Movement disorder that can involve excessive eye blinking (blepharospasm) with involuntary movements of the jaw muscles, lips, and tongue (oromandibular dystonia).
Ménière's disease
Inner ear disorder that can affect both hearing and balance. It can cause episodes of vertigo, hearing loss, tinnitus, and the sensation of fullness in the ear.
Meningitis
Inflammation of the meninges, the membranes that envelop the brain and the spinal cord; may cause hearing loss or deafness.
Middle ear
Part of the ear that includes the eardrum and three tiny bones of the middle ear, ending at the round window that leads to the inner ear.
Misarticulation
Innacurately produced speech sound (phoneme) or sounds.
Motor speech disorders
Group of disorders caused by the inability to accurately produce speech sounds (phonemes) because of muscle weakness or incoordination or difficulty performing voluntary muscle movements.

== N ==
Neuroplasticity
Ability of the brain and/or certain parts of the nervous system to adapt to new conditions, such as an injury.
Neural prostheses
Devices that substitute for an injured or diseased part of the nervous system, such as the cochlear implant.
Neural stimulation
To activate or energize a nerve through an external source.
Neurofibromatosis Type 1 (NF-1 von Recklinghausen's)
Group of inherited disorders in which noncancerous tumors grow on several nerves that may include the hearing nerve. The symptoms of NF-1 include coffee-colored spots on the skin, enlargement, deformation of bones, and neurofibromas.
Neurofibromatosis Type 2 (NF-2)
Group of inherited disorders in which noncancerous tumors grow on several nerves that usually include the hearing nerve. The symptoms of NF-2 include tumors on the hearing nerve which can affect hearing and balance. NF-2 may occur in the teenage years with hearing loss. Also see acoustic neurinoma.
Neurogenic communication disorder
Inability to exchange information with others because of hearing, speech, and/or language problems caused by impairment of the nervous system (brain or nerves).
Noise-induced hearing loss
Hearing loss caused by exposure to harmful sounds, either very loud impulse sound(s) or repeated exposure to sounds over 90-decibel level over an extended period of time that damage the sensitive structures of the inner ear.
Nonsyndromic hereditary hearing impairment
Hearing loss or deafness that is inherited and is not associated with other inherited clinical characteristics.

== O ==
Odorant
Substance that stimulates the sense of smell.
Olfaction
The act of smelling.
Olfactometer
Device for estimating the intensity of the sense of smell.
Open-set speech recognition
Understanding speech without visual clues (speech reading).
Otitis externa
Inflammation of the outer part of the ear extending to the auditory canal.
Otitis media
Inflammation of the middle ear caused by infection.
Otoacoustic emissions
Low-intensity sounds produced by the inner ear that can be quickly measured with a sensitive microphone placed in the ear canal.
Otolaryngologist
Physician/surgeon who specializes in diseases of the ears, nose, throat, and head and neck.
Otologist
Physician/surgeon who specializes in diseases of the ear.
Otosclerosis
Abnormal growth of bone of the inner ear. This bone prevents structures within the ear from working properly and causes hearing loss. For some people with otosclerosis, the hearing loss may become severe.
Ototoxic drugs
Drugs such as a special class of antibiotics, aminoglycoside antibiotics, that can damage the hearing and balance organs located in the inner ear for some individuals.
Outer ear
External portion of the ear, consisting of the pinna, or auricle, and the ear canal.

== P ==
Papillomavirus
Group of viruses that can cause noncancerous wart-like tumors to grow on the surface of skin and internal organs such as the respiratory tract; can be life-threatening.
Parosmia
Any disease or perversion of the sense of smell, especially the subjective perception of odors that do not exist.
Perception (Hearing)
Process of knowing or being aware of information through the ear.
Perilymph fistula
Leakage of inner ear fluid to the middle ear that occurs without apparent cause or that is associated with head trauma, physical exertion, or barotrauma.
Pervasive developmental disorders
Disorders characterized by delays in several areas of development that may include socialization and communication.
Pheromones
Chemical substances secreted by an animal that elicit a specific behavioral or physiological response in another animal of the same species.
Phonology
Study of speech sounds.
Postlingually deafened
Individual who becomes deaf after having acquired language.
Prelingually deafened
Individual who is either born deaf or who lost their hearing early in childhood, before acquiring language.
Presbycusis
Loss of hearing that gradually occurs because of changes in the inner or middle ear in individuals as they grow older.

== R ==
Reading disorders
Any of a group of problems characterized by difficulty using or understanding the symbol system for written language.
Round window
Membrane separating the middle ear and inner ear.

== S ==
Sensorineural hearing loss
Hearing loss caused by damage to the sensory cells and/or nerve fibers of the inner ear.
Sign language
Method of communication for people who are deaf or hard of hearing in which hand movements, gestures, and facial expressions convey grammatical structure and meaning. rhinitis.
Sound vocalization
Ability to produce voice.
Spasmodic dysphonia
Momentary disruption of voice caused by involuntary movements of one or more muscles of the larynx or voice box.
Specific language impairment (SLI)
Difficulty with language or the organized-symbol system used for communication in the absence of problems such as mental retardation, hearing loss, or emotional disorders.
Speech
Spoken communication.
Speech disorder
Any defect or abnormality that prevents an individual from communicating by means of spoken words. Speech disorders may develop from nerve injury to the brain, muscular paralysis, structural defects, hysteria, or mental retardation.
Speech processor
Part of a cochlear implant that converts speech sounds into electrical impulses to stimulate the auditory nerve, allowing an individual to understand sound and speech.
Speech-language pathologist
Health professional trained to evaluate and treat people who have voice, speech, language, or swallowing disorders (including hearing impairment) that affect their ability to communicate.
Stroke
Also known as a cerebrovascular accident (CVA); caused by a lack of blood to the brain, resulting in the sudden loss of speech, language, or the ability to move a body part, and, if severe enough, death.
Stuttering
Frequent repetition of words or parts of words that disrupts the smooth flow of speech.
Sudden deafness
Loss of hearing that occurs quickly due to such causes as explosion, a viral infection, or the use of some drugs.
Swallowing disorders
Any of a group of problems that interferes with the transfer of food from the mouth to the stomach.
Syndromic hearing impairment
Hearing loss or deafness that, along with other characteristics, is inherited or passed down through generations of a family.

== T ==
Tactile
Related to touch or the sense of touch.
Tactile devices
Mechanical instruments that make use of touch to help individuals who have certain disabilities, such as deaf-blindness, to communicate.
Throat disorders
Disorders or diseases of the larynx (voice box), pharynx, or esophagus.
Thyroplasty
Surgical technique(s) to improve the human voice by altering single or multiple structures of the larynx, which houses the vocal folds (vocal cords) with the related controlling nerves, muscles, and cartilage. Typically, this surgery is considered to improve the position or tension of the vocal folds which can improve vocal volume and production. This is also known as laryngeal framework surgery. The most common technique may be to insert small blocks of custom-shaped silastin just inside of the tracheal wall, pushing the vocal fold muscle inward (medialization). This typically strengthens the output of a weaker voice but it also reduces the exchange volume of pulmonary function, as the tracheal opening has been permanently reduced. This surgery is named for its proximity to the thyroid gland.
Tinnitus
Sensation of a ringing, roaring, or buzzing sound in the ears or head. It is often associated with many forms of hearing impairment. Noise exposure and inner ear infections are but two predisposing conditions which can lead to the development of tinnitus.
Tongue
Large muscle on the floor of the mouth that manipulates food for chewing and swallowing. It is the main organ of taste, and assists in forming speech sounds.
Touch
Tactile sense; the sense by which contact with the skin or mucous membrane is experienced.
Tourette syndrome
Neurological disorder characterized by recurring movements and sounds (called tics).
Tracheostomy
Surgical opening into the trachea (windpipe) to help someone breathe who has an obstruction or swelling in the larynx (voice box) or upper throat or who has had the larynx surgically removed.
Tuberous Sclerosis
Hereditary disease with multiorgan manifestation. Typical symptoms are epileptic seizures, autism, skin disorders, and renal tumors.
Tympanoplasty
Surgical repair of the eardrum (tympanic membrane) or bones of the middle ear.

== U ==
Umami
Taste of substances such as L-glutamate salts (MSG) that are found in foods like bouillon and other stocks. (reference:Yamaguchi S, Ninomiya K. J Nutr. 2000 Apr:130(4S Suppl):921S-926S.)
Usher syndrome
Hereditary disease that affects hearing and vision and sometimes balance.
Ulna
Long bone in the arm on the pinky side that goes from the humerus to the carpal.

== V ==
Velocardiofacial syndrome
Inherited disorder characterized by cleft palate (opening in the roof of the mouth), heart defects, characteristic facial appearance, minor learning problems, and speech and feeding problems.
Vertigo
Illusion of movement; a sensation as if the external world were revolving around an individual (objective vertigo) or as if the individual were revolving in space (subjective vertigo).
Vestibular Neuronitis
Infection at the vestibular nerve.
Vestibular system
System in the body that is responsible for maintaining balance, posture, and the body's orientation in space. This system also regulates locomotion and other movements and keeps objects in visual focus as the body moves.
Vestibule
Bony cavity of the inner ear.
Vibrotactile aids
Mechanical instruments that help individuals who are deaf to detect and interpret sound through the sense of touch.
Vocal cord paralysis
Inability of one or both vocal folds (vocal cords) to move because of damage to the brain or nerves.
Vocal cords (Vocal folds)
Muscularized folds of mucous membrane that extend from the larynx (voice box) wall. The folds are enclosed in elastic vocal ligament and muscle that control the tension and rate of vibration of the cords as air passes through them.
Vocal folds
See Vocal cords.
Vocal tremor
Trembling or shaking of one or more of the muscles of the larynx, resulting in an unsteady-sounding voice.
Voice
Sound produced by air passing out through the larynx and upper respiratory tract.
Voice disorders
Group of problems involving abnormal pitch, loudness, or quality of the sound produced by the larynx (voice box).

== W ==
Waardenburg syndrome
Hereditary disorder that is characterized by hearing impairment, a white shock of hair and/or distinctive blue color to one or both eyes, and wide-set inner corners of the eyes. Balance problems are also associated with some types of Waardenburg syndrome.
