= List of abbreviations for medical organisations and personnel =

== A ==
Abbreviation	Organization or personnel
AA	Alcoholics Anonymous
AABB	AABB, formerly known as the American Association of Blood Banks
AACN	American Association of Critical-Care Nurses
AAD	American Association of Dermatology
AADGP	American Academy of Dental Group Practice
AAFP	American Academy of Family Physicians
AAIN	American Academy of Industrial Nurses
AAMC	Australian Army Medical Corps
AAN	American Academy of Nursing
AANS	Australian Army Nursing Service
AAO	American Academy of Ophthalmology
AAO	American Academy of Optometry
AAOS	American Academy of Orthopaedic Surgeons
AAP	American Academy of Pediatrics
ABEM	American Board of Emergency Medicine
ABMS	American Board of Medical Specialties
ACCP	American College of Chest Physicians
ACEP	American College of Emergency Physicians
ACMPH	American College of Military Public Health
ACGME	Accreditation Council for Graduate Medical Education
ACOG	American College of Obstetricians and Gynecologists
ACP	Advanced Care Paramedic (Canada)
ACR	American College of Radiology
ACR	American College of Rheumatology
ACS	American Cancer Society
ACP	American College of Physicians
ACS	American College of Surgeons
ADA	American Dental Association
ADA	American Diabetes Association
AGD	Academy of General Dentistry
AHA	American Heart Association
AIEOP	Associazione Italiana Ematologia Oncologia Pediatrica (Italian association to study pediatric oncology)
AMA	American Medical Association
AMIA	American Medical Informatics Association
AMA	Australian Medical Association
AMSA	American Medical Student Association
AMT	American Medical Technologists
ANA	American Nurses Association
AND	Academy of Nutrition and Dietetics (formerly American Dietetic Association)
ANF	Australian Nursing Federation
ANNA	American Nephrology Nurses' Association
AOA	American Optometric Association
AOA	Australian Orthopaedic Association
AOA	American Osteopathic Association
AOBEM	American Osteopathic Board of Emergency Medicine
AORN	Association of Perioperative Registered Nurses
APGAR	American Pediatric Gross Assessment Record (a backronym)
APA	American Psychiatric Association
APN	Advanced practice nurse
ARA	American Rheumatological Association
ARRT	American Registry of Radiologic Technologists
ASCEPT	Australasian Society of Clinical & Experimental Pharmacologists and Toxicologists
ASCP	American Society for Clinical Pathology
ASCP	American Society of Consultant Pharmacists
ASFA	American Society for Apheresis
ASHA	American Speech–Language–Hearing Association
ASMI	Australian Self-Medication Industry
ASMSO	American Society of Medication Safety Officers
ASPS	American Society of Plastic Surgeons
ASRT	American Society of Radiologic Technologists
ASTRO	ASTRO (American Society for Radiation Oncology)
ASSH	American Society for Surgery of the Hand
AWHONN	Association of Women's Health, Obstetric and Neonatal Nurses

== B ==
Abbreviation	Organization or personnel
BMA	British Medical Association
BAAPS	British Association of Aesthetic Plastic Surgeons
BNF	British National Formulary

== C ==
Abbreviation	Organization or personnel
CAD	Canadian Association of the Deaf
CAEP	Canadian Association of Emergency Physicians
CAG	Canadian Association of Gerontology
CAMT	Canadian Association of Music Therapy
CAMTS	Commission on Accreditation of Medical Transport Systems
CAO	Canadian Association of Optometrists
CAOT	Canadian Association of Occupational Therapists
CAP	Canadian Association of Physicists
CAP	College of American Pathologists
CAR	Canadian Association of Radiologists
CASLPA	Canadian Association of Speech-Language Pathologists and Audiologists
CASLPO	College of Audiologists and Speech-Language Pathologists of Ontario
CCG	Children's Cancer Group
CCOHS	Canadian Centre for Occupational Health
CCRN	Certification for adult, pediatric and neonatal critical care nurses
CCS	Canadian Cardiovascular Society
CDAAC	Communicative Disorders Assistant Association of Canada
CDC	Centers for Disease Control and Prevention
CESMA	Council for European Specialist Medical Assessments
CHT	Certified Hand Therapist
CMA	Canadian Medical Association
CMA	Certified medical assistant
CMS	Centers for Medicare and Medicaid Services
CNA	Certified Nursing Assistant
COG	Children's Oncology Group
COTA(A)	Council on the Ageing (Australia)
CPhT	Certified pharmacy technician
CPM	Certified Professional Midwife
CPME	Standing Committee of European Doctors
CRD	Centre for Reviews and Dissemination
CRN	Certified radiology nurse
CRNA	Certified registered nurse anesthetist
CRT	Certified respiratory therapists – Respiratory therapy
CRT	Certified Radiologic Technologist – California License
CRTT	Certified Respiratory Therapy Technicians – Respiratory therapy
CTRS	Certified therapeutic recreation specialist – Recreation therapy or Therapeutic recreation
CSA	Certified surgical assistant
CST	Certified Surgical Technologist
CWS	cooperative weichteilsarkomen study (German soft tissue sarcoma cooperative group)

== D ==
Abbreviation	Organization or personnel
DC	Doctor of Chiropractic
DDS	Doctor of Dental Surgery
DHB	District Health Board (New Zealand)
DI	Digital Imaging Technologist
DMD	Doctor of Dental Medicine
DNP	Doctor of Nursing Practice
DO	Doctor of Osteopathic Medicine
DoH	Department of Health (various countries)
DNB	Diplomate of National Board India
DPT	Doctor of Physical Therapy
DPM	Doctor of Podiatric Medicine

== E ==
Abbreviation	Organization or personnel
EMA	European Medicines Agency
EMS	Emergency medical services
EMT	Emergency medical technician
EMT-B	Emergency Medical Technician - Basic(OLD)
EMT-I	Emergency Medical Technician - Intermediate (OLD)
EMT-P	Emergency Medical Technician - Paramedic (OLD)
EN	Enrolled nurse (AU) – See Licensed practical nurse
EORTC	European Organization for Research Treatment in Cancer
EpSSG	European paediatric soft tissue sarcoma study group
ESRD	End Stage Renal Disease Program
ESTIV	European Society of Toxicology in Vitro

== F ==
Abbreviation	Organization or personnel
FDA	Food and Drug Administration
FACC	Fellowship in the American College of Cardiology
FACE	Fellow of the American College of Endocrinology
FACP	Fellow of the American College of Physicians
FAHA	Fellow of the American Heart Association
FCCP	Fellow of the American College of Chest Physicians
FCRSA	
FHO	Foundation house officer
FIGO	International Federation of Gynecology and Obstetrics
FNKR	
FNLA	Fellow of the National Lipid Association
FNP	Family Nurse Practitioner
FRCP	Fellow of the Royal College of Physicians (UK)
FVRS	Fellowship in Vitreo-Retinal Surgery
FAPA	Fellowship, American Psychiatric Association

== G ==
Abbreviation	Organization or personnel
GDC	General Dental Council (UK)
GMC	General Medical Council (UK)
GMS	General medical services medical services provided by GPs (UK)
GP	General practitioner
GPhC	General Pharmaceutical Council (UK)

== H ==
Abbreviation	Organization or personnel
HC	Health Canada
HEMS	Helicopter Emergency Medical Service
HPCSA	Health Professions Council of South Africa
HSE	Health Service Executive (Ireland)

== I ==
Abbreviation	Organization or personnel
IASP	International Association for the Study of Pain
IAMMS	Ibn Sina Academy of Medieval Medicine and Sciences
IBCLC	International Board Certified Lactation Consultant
ICG	Italian Cooperative Group
IFMSA	International Federation of Medical Students' Associations
IMD	Institution for Mental Disease
IMF	Irish Medicines Formulary
IMO	Irish Medical Organisation
INHS	Inland Northwest Health Services
ISMP	Institute for Safe Medication Practices

== J ==
Abbreviation	Organization or personnel
JAMA	Journal of the American Medical Association
JAOA	Journal of the American Osteopathic Association
JC	Joint Commission, previously JCAHO

== L ==
Abbreviation	Organization or personnel
LA	Laboratory aide or assistant
LMSSA	Licentiate in Medicine and Surgery of the Society of Apothecaries
LMT	Licensed massage therapist
LPN	Licensed practical nurse
LSA	Licensed surgical assistant
LVN	Licensed vocational nurse – see licensed practical nurse

== M ==
Abbreviation	Organization or personnel
MASH	Mobile army surgical hospital (US)
MedPAC	Medicare Payment Advisory Commission
MD	Doctor of Medicine
MLA	Medical laboratory assistant
MT	Medical technologist
MLT	Medical laboratory technician
MOH	Ministry of Health (various countries)
MRCP	Membership of the Royal College of Physicians
MRCS	Membership of the Royal College of Surgeons
MRT	Medical radiation technologist
MP	Medical psychologist
MPH	Master of Public Health
MSOS	Medication Safety Officers Society
MSPT	Master of Science in Physical Therapy

== N ==
Abbreviation	Organization or personnel
NA	Narcotics Anonymous
NAACLS	National accrediting agency for clinical laboratory science
NAPCRG	North American Primary Care Research Group
NCA	National credentialing agency for laboratory personnel
NCI	National Cancer Institute
NCTMB	Nationally certified in therapeutic massage and bodywork
NEJM	New England Journal of Medicine
NHC	Nephrology Hypertension Clinic, P.C
NHS	National Health Service
NICE	National Institute for Health and Clinical Excellence
NKC	Northwest Kidney Centers
NKF	National Kidney Foundation
NYHA	New York Heart Association
NPS	National Prescribing Service (Australia)
NPSA	National Pharmaceutical Services Association
NREMT	National Registry of Emergency Medical Technicians(ORG)
NREMR	National Registry Emergency Medical First Responder (NREMR)
NREMT	National Registry Emergency Medical Technician (NREMT)
NRS	Nurse
NRAEMT	National Registry Advanced Emergency Medical Technician (NRAEMT)
NRP	National Registry Paramedic
NZNO	New Zealand Nurses Organisation

== O ==
Abbreviation	Organization or personnel
OD	Doctor of Optometry
ONG	Orthodontic National Group
OTA	Orthodontic Technicians Association
OTR	Occupational Therapist Registered

== P ==
Abbreviation	Organization or personnel
PA	Physician assistant or pathologist assistant
PAC	Certified Physician assistant or pathologist assistant
CPT	Phlebotomist
PCT	Primary care trust (UK)
PGNZ	Pharmaceutical Guild of New Zealand
PHARM	Pharmaceutical Health and Rational Use of Medicines (Australia)
Pharm.D	Doctor of Pharmacy
PMS	Personal Medical Services alternative contract for UK GPs
POG	Pediatric Oncology Group
PRHO	Pre-registration house officer (UK)
PSNZ	Pharmaceutical Society of New Zealand

== R ==
Abbreviation	Organization or personnel
RA	Radiologist's assistant
RACP	Royal Australasian College of Physicians
RACS	Royal Australasian College of Surgeons
RCGP	Royal College of General Practitioners
RCIS	Registered Cardiovascular Invasive Specialist
RCS	Registered Cardiovascular Specialist
RCM	Royal College of Midwives
RCN	Royal College of Nursing
RCOG	Royal College of Obstetricians and Gynaecologists
RCP	Royal College of Pathologists
RCP	Royal College of Physicians
RCPA	Royal College of Pathologists of Australasia
RCS	Royal College of Surgeons (England)
RCSI	Royal College of Surgeons in Ireland
RD	Registered Dietitian
RMA	Registered medical assistant
RN	Registered nurse
R.Ph	Registered pharmacist
RPhT	Registered pharmacy technician
RPN	Registered practical nurse — See Licensed practical nurse
RPN	Registered psychiatric nurse
RPS	Royal Pharmaceutical Society
RRT	Registered Respiratory Therapist - Respiratory therapy
RVT	Registered Veterinary Technician
RSN	Renal support network
RT	Radiologic technologist
RT	Respiratory therapist – Respiratory therapy

== S ==
Abbreviation	Organization or personnel
SCOAP	Surgical Care and Outcomes Assessment Program
SEN	State Enrolled Nurse (UK) – See Licensed Practical Nurse
SHO	Senior house officer (UK)
SIGN	Scottish Intercollegiate Guidelines Network (SIGN and NICE are major centers of CPG development)
SIOP	International Society of Paediatric Oncology
SN	Student nurse
SOMA	Student Osteopathic Medical Association
STFM	Society of Teachers of Family Medicine
STSC	Soft tissue sarcoma committee
SpR	Specialist registrar (UK)
SLP	Speech-language pathologist

== U ==
Abbreviation	Organization or personnel
UDC	University Disability Consortium
UEMS	Union Européenne des Médecins Spécialistes
UKPDS	United Kingdom Prospective Diabetes Study
UNOS	United Network for Organ Sharing
USMLE	United States Medical Licensing Examination

== V ==
Abbreviation	Organization or personnel
VA	Veterans Administration – United States Department of Veterans Affairs

== W ==
Abbreviation	Organization or personnel
WHO	World Health Organization
WMA	World Medical Association
