= Influenza-like illness =

Medical diagnosis

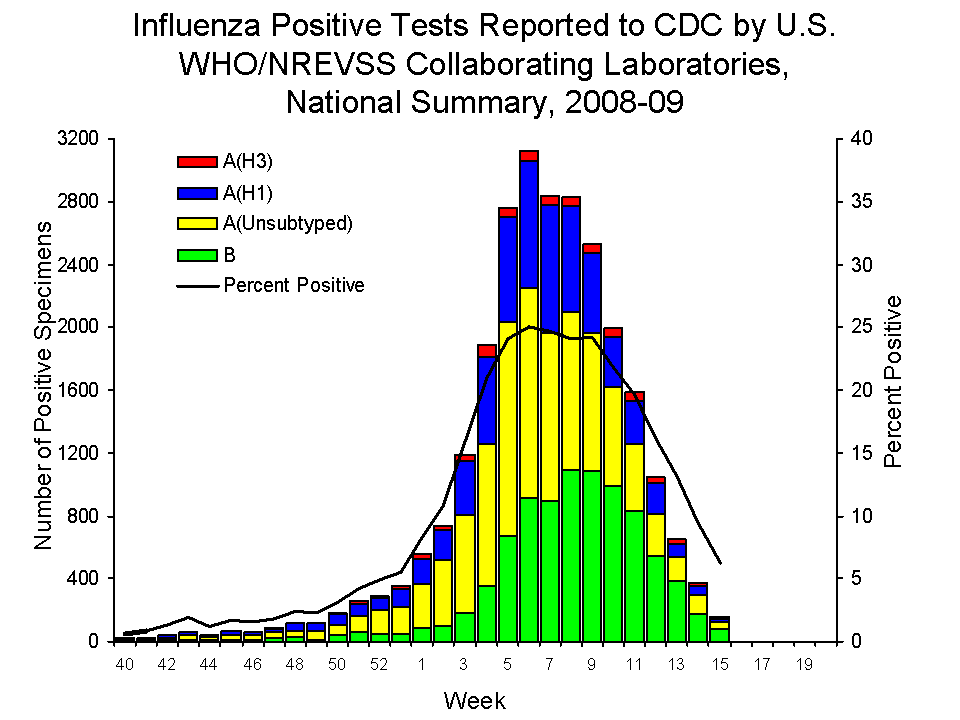
- Proportion of positive influenza tests during a flu season.

Influenza-like illness (ILI), also known as flu-like syndrome or flu-like symptoms, is a medical diagnosis of possible influenza or other illness causing a set of common symptoms. These include fever, shivering, chills, malaise, dry cough, loss of appetite, body aches, nausea, and sneezing typically in connection with a sudden onset of illness. In most cases, the symptoms are caused by cytokines released by immune system activation, and are thus relatively non-specific.

Common causes of ILI include the common cold and influenza, which tends to be less common but more severe than the common cold. Less common causes include side effects of many drugs and manifestations of many other diseases.

== Definition ==
The term ILI can be used casually, but when used in the surveillance of influenza cases, can have a strict definition. The World Health Organization defines an illness as an ILI if the patient has a fever greater than or equal to 38 °C and a cough, which began in the last 10 days. If the patient's condition requires hospitalisation, the illness is classified instead as a severe acute respiratory infection (SARI). Other organisations may have different definitions. For instance, the CDC defines it as a 100 °F (38 °C) fever or greater, and a cough or sore throat.

== Causes ==
The causes of influenza-like illness range from benign self-limited illnesses such as gastroenteritis, rhinoviral disease, and influenza, to severe, sometimes life-threatening, diseases such as meningitis, sepsis, and leukemia.

=== Influenza ===
Technically, any clinical diagnosis of influenza is a diagnosis of ILI, not of influenza. This distinction usually is of no great concern because, regardless of cause, most cases of ILI are mild and self-limiting. Furthermore, except perhaps during the peak of a major outbreak of influenza, most cases of ILI are not due to influenza. ILI is very common: in the United States each adult can average 1–3 episodes per year and each child can average 3–6 episodes per year.

Influenza in humans is subject to clinical surveillance by a global network of more than 110 National Influenza Centers. These centers receive samples obtained from patients diagnosed with ILI, and test the samples for the presence of an influenza virus. Not all patients diagnosed with ILI are tested, and not all test results are reported. Samples are selected for testing based on severity of ILI, and as part of routine sampling, and at participating surveillance clinics and laboratories. The United States has a general surveillance program, a border surveillance program, and a hospital surveillance program, all devoted to finding new outbreaks of influenza.

In most years, in the majority of samples tested, the influenza virus is not present (see figure above). In the United States during the 2008–9 influenza season through 18 April, out of 183,839 samples tested and reported to the CDC, only 25,925 (14.1%) were positive for influenza. The percent positive reached a maximum of about 25%. The percent positive increases with the incidence of infection, peaking with the peak incidence of influenza (see figure). During an epidemic, 60–70% of patients with a clear influenza-like illness actually have influenza.

Samples are respiratory samples, usually collected by a physician, nurse, or assistant, and sent to a hospital laboratory for preliminary testing. There are several methods of collecting a respiratory sample, depending on requirements of the laboratory that will test the sample. A sample may be obtained from around the nose simply by wiping with a dry cotton swab.

=== Other causes ===
Infectious diseases causing ILI include respiratory syncytial virus, human metapneumovirus infection, malaria, acute HIV/AIDS infection, herpes, hepatitis C, Lyme disease, rabies, myocarditis, Q fever, dengue fever, poliomyelitis, pneumonia, measles, SARS, COVID-19, and many others.

Pharmaceutical drugs that may cause ILI include many biologics such as interferons and monoclonal antibodies. Chemotherapeutic agents also commonly cause flu-like symptoms. Other drugs associated with a flu-like syndrome include bisphosphonates, caspofungin, and levamisole. A flu-like syndrome can also be caused by an influenza vaccine or other vaccines, and by opioid withdrawal in physically dependent individuals.

== Diagnosis ==
Influenza-like illness is a nonspecific respiratory illness characterized by fever, fatigue, cough, and other symptoms that stop within a few days. Most cases of ILI are caused not by influenza but by other viruses (e.g., rhinoviruses, coronaviruses, human respiratory syncytial virus, adenoviruses, and human parainfluenza viruses). Less common causes of ILI include bacteria such as Legionella, Chlamydia pneumoniae, Mycoplasma pneumoniae, and Streptococcus pneumoniae. Influenza, RSV, and certain bacterial infections are particularly important causes of ILI because these infections can lead to serious complications requiring hospitalization. Physicians who examine persons with ILI can use a combination of epidemiologic and clinical data (information about recent other patients and the individual patient) and, if necessary, laboratory and radiographic tests to determine the cause of the ILI. The use of multiplexed point-of-care testing such as CRP (C-reactive protein) along with an examination by a doctor may help to identify a bacterial and avoid an unnecessary antibiotic prescription.

During the 2009 flu pandemic, many thousands of cases of ILI were reported in the media as suspected swine flu. Most were false alarms. A differential diagnosis of probable swine flu requires not only symptoms but also a high likelihood of swine flu due to the person's recent history. During the 2009 flu pandemic in the United States, the CDC advised physicians to "consider swine influenza infection in the differential diagnosis of patients with acute febrile respiratory illness who have either been in contact with persons with confirmed swine flu, or who were in one of the five U.S. states that have reported swine flu cases or in Mexico during the 7 days preceding their illness onset." A diagnosis of confirmed swine flu required laboratory testing of a respiratory sample (a simple nose and throat swab).

=== In rare cases ===
If a person with ILI also has either a history of exposure or an occupational or environmental risk of exposure to Bacillus anthracis (anthrax), then a differential diagnosis requires distinguishing between ILI and anthrax. Other rare causes of ILI include leukemia and metal fume fever.

== In horses ==
ILI occurs in some horses after intramuscular injection of vaccines. For these horses, light exercise speeds resolution of the ILI. Non-steroidal anti-inflammatory drugs (NSAIDs) may be given with the vaccine.

== See also ==
- Attack rate
- Disease surveillance
- Histamine glutarimide
