= List of infectious diseases causing flu-like syndrome =

This is a list of infectious diseases, other than the most common ones, that cause flu-like syndrome (influenza-like illness):

== Bacterial ==
- Anthrax
- Brucellosis
- Cat scratch fever
- Legionellosis
- Leptospirosis
- Listeriosis
- Lyme disease
- Lymphogranuloma venereum
- Mastitis
- Salmonellosis
- Toxic Shock Syndrome
- Syphilis
- Tuberculosis
- Scrub typhus
- Rocky Mountain spotted fever

== Viral ==
- Bornholm disease (Coxsackie B virus)
- COVID-19
- Chickenpox
- Cytomegalovirus
- Eastern equine encephalitis virus
- California encephalitis virus
- Enteroviruses
- Hendra virus
- Hepatitis A, B, C, D, E
- Herpes
- HIV-1, -2
- Newcastle disease
- Human parainfluenza viruses
- Human rhinovirus
- Measles
- MERS coronavirus
- Human respiratory syncytial virus (RSV)
- Rubella
- SARS coronavirus
- SARS coronavirus 2
- Slapped cheek syndrome
- Smallpox
- Togaviridae
- Venezuelan equine encephalitis

== Fungal ==
- Blastomycosis
- Coccidioidomycosis
- Histoplasmosis
- Stachybotrys chartarum

== Protozoan ==
- Babesiosis
- Leishmaniasis
- Malaria
- Toxoplasmosis
