= Qazi–Markouizos syndrome =

- Other names: Dysharmonic skeletal maturation-muscular fiber disproportion syndrome

Qazi–Markouizos syndrome is a rare hereditary condition characterized by non-progressive, congenital hypotonia, severe intellectual disability, an increased proportion of type 2 muscle fibers, which additionally exhibit increased size, as well as dysharmonic skeletal maturation. To date, the molecular mechanism of Qazi–Markouizos syndrome, which is also known as Puerto Rican infant hypotonia syndrome, remains unknown.
