= Histamine glutarimide =

Chemical compound

Clinical data
- Other names: XC-8

Legal status
- Legal status: Investigational

Identifiers
- IUPAC name: 1-[2-(1H-imidazol-5-yl)ethyl]piperidine-2,6-dione
- CAS Number: 1464897-15-1
- PubChem CID: 24826317
- DrugBank: DB16016
- ChemSpider: 48673501
- UNII: VOM9DP10M3

Chemical and physical data
- Formula: C_{10}H_{13}N_{3}O_{2}
- Molar mass: 207.233 g·mol^{−1}
- 3D model (JSmol): Interactive image
- SMILES: C1CC(=O)N(C(=O)C1)CCC2=CN=CN2
- InChI: InChI=1S/C10H13N3O2/c14-9-2-1-3-10(15)13(9)5-4-8-6-11-7-12-8/h6-7H,1-5H2,(H,11,12); Key:DYKZYSKWOHKZMF-UHFFFAOYSA-N

Histamine glutarimide is an investigational new drug that is being evaluated for the treatment of cough in acute respiratory infection. It is a glutaminyl cyclase inhibitor.
