= Sudden unexplained nocturnal death syndrome =

Sudden unexplained nocturnal death syndrome may refer to:

- Brugada syndrome, a genetic disorder in which the electrical activity within the heart is abnormal
- Sudden arrhythmic death syndrome (SADS), a sudden unexpected death of adolescents and adults, mainly during sleep
- Pokkuri Death Syndrome (PDS), a form of sudden unexpected death in Japan affecting young, seemingly healthy males, often during sleep, with no obvious cause.
