= Registered cardiovascular invasive specialist =

Medical profession

A registered cardiovascular invasive specialist (RCIS) assists a cardiologist with cardiac catheterization procedures in the United States. These procedures can determine if a blockage exists in the blood vessels that supply the heart muscle, and can help diagnose other problems.

To become registered, one must pass the registry proctored by CCI (Cardiovascular Credentialing International). The exam consists of 170 multiple choice questions. Some questions involve mathematical computation as well as pictures where one must identify anatomy and equipment. To be registry eligible, a candidate must have worked in a cardiac catheterization laboratory for at least one year or have graduated from a registry–eligible program.

== See also ==
- Cardiac catheterization
