= American College of Military Public Health =

US research organization

The American College of Military Public Health (ACMPH) is an association of public health scientists and clinicians who promote health among U.S. military service members and their families. The ACMPH focuses on traumatic brain injuries (TBI), post-traumatic stress disorder (PTSD), and infectious disease control. The organization was founded in 2016.
