= List of abbreviations used in health informatics =

This is a list of abbreviations used in health informatics.

- ACA, Affordable Care Act
- DICOM, a standard for handling, storing, printing, and transmitting information in medical imaging. It includes a file format definition and a network communications protocol. The communication protocol is an application protocol that uses TCP/IP to communicate between systems. DICOM files can be exchanged between two entities that are capable of receiving image and patient data in DICOM format.
- HITM, European Association of Healthcare IT Managers
- RIS, Radiology Information System
- HIS, Hospital Information System
- PACS, Picture Archiving and Communications System
- EHR Electronic Health Record
- HTA Healthcare Technology Assessment
- RFID Radio Frequency Identification
- CALLIOPE, a European coordination network for eHealth interoperability implementation, launched on 1 June 2008 by the EU-funded Thematic Network with a duration of 30 months
- CEN The European Committee for Standardization (CEN) a European business organization aimed at removing trade barriers for European industry and consumers.
- DG INFSO, Directorate-General for Information Society and Media (European Commission), a Directorate-General of the European Commission that deals with research, policy and regulation on the areas of information and communication technology and media.
- ICT, Information and Communication Technologies
- e-health (also written e-health) is a relatively recent term for healthcare practice supported by electronic processes and communication, dating back to at least 1999. Usage of the term varies: some would argue it is interchangeable with health informatics with a broad definition covering electronic/digital processes in health, while others use it in the narrower sense of healthcare practice using the Internet.
- Mhealth (also written as m-health or mobile health), a sub-segment of eHealth used for the practice of medical and public health supported by mobile devices for health services and information.
