= List of medical abbreviations: Latin abbreviations =

The main discussion of these abbreviations in the context of drug prescriptions and other medical prescriptions is at List of abbreviations used in medical prescriptions. Some of these abbreviations are best not used, as marked and explained here.

Abbrev.	Meaning	Latin (or Neo-Latin) origin
a.c.	before meals	ante cibum
a.d., ad, AD	right ear	auris dextra
a.m., am, AM	morning	ante meridiem
nocte	every night	Omne Nocte
a.s., as, AS	left ear	auris sinistra
a.u., au, AU	both ears together or each ear	aures unitas or auris uterque
b.d.s, bds, BDS	2 times a day	bis die sumendum
b.i.d., bid, BID	twice a day / twice daily	bis in die
gtt., gtts	drop(s)	gutta(e)
h., h	hour	hora
qhs, h.s., hs	at bedtime or half strength	quaque hora somni
ii	two tablets	duos doses
iii	three tablets	trēs doses
n.p.o., npo, NPO	nothing by mouth / not by oral administration	nihil per os
o.d., od, OD	right eye once a day (United Kingdom)	oculus dexter omne in die
o.s., os, OS	left eye	oculus sinister
o.u., ou, OU	both eyes	oculus uterque
p.c.	after food	post cibum
p.m., pm, PM	afternoon or evening	post meridiem
p.o., po, PO	by mouth / oral administration	per os / nonstandard form per orem
p.r., pr, PR	rectally / rectal administration	per rectum
p.r.n., prn, PRN	as needed	pro re nata
q.	every	quaque
q.1.h., q1h	every hour	quaque hora
q.2.h., q2h	every 2 hours	quaque secunda hora
q.4.h., q4h	every 4 hours	quaque quarta hora
q.6.h., q6h	every 6 hours	quaque sexta hora
q.8.h., q8h	every 8 hours	quaque octava hora
q.a.m., qAM, qam	every morning	quaque ante meridiem
q.d., qd	every day / daily	quaque die
q.h.s., qhs	every night at bedtime	quaque hora somni
q.d.s, qds, QDS	4 times a day	quater die sumendum
q.i.d, qid	4 times a day	quater in die
q.h., qh	every hour, hourly	quaque hora
q.o.d., qod	every other day / alternate days	quaque altera die
q.p.m., qPM, qpm	every afternoon or evening	quaque post meridiem
q.s., qs	a sufficient quantity (enough)	quantum sufficiat
q.wk. also qw	weekly (once a week)	quaque week
Rx, R_{x}, ℞	prescription	recipe
Sig., S.	directions	signa
Stat.	immediately, with no delay, now	statim
t.i.d., tid, TID	3 times a day	ter in die
t.d.s., tds, TDS	take by mouth 3 times a day	ter die sumendus
u.d., ud	as directed	ut dictum
