= Aural rehabilitation =

Medical rehabilitation procedure

Aural rehabilitation is the process of identifying and diagnosing a hearing loss, providing different types of therapies to clients who are hard of hearing, and implementing different amplification devices to aid the client's hearing abilities. Aural rehab includes specific procedures in which each therapy and amplification device has as its goal the habilitation or rehabilitation of persons to overcome the disability caused by a hearing impairment or deafness.

Aural rehabilitation is frequently used as an integral component in managing individuals with hearing loss. It refers to services and procedures for facilitating adequate receptive and expressive communication in individuals with hearing differences. Aural rehabilitation is often an interdisciplinary endeavor involving physicians, audiologists and speech-language pathologists.

== Scope of practice ==
Audiologists and speech-language pathologists are professionals who typically provide aural rehabilitation components. The audiologist may be responsible for the fitting, dispensing and management of a hearing device, counseling the client about his or her hearing loss, the application of certain processes to enhance communication, and the skills training regarding environmental modifications which will facilitate the development of receptive and expressive communication. The speech-language pathologist is typically responsible for evaluating the client's receptive and expressive communication skills and providing the services to anchor improvement. The speech-language pathologist also provides training and treatment for communication strategies, speech-perception training (e.g., speechreading, auditory training and auditory-visual-speech-perception training), speech and voice production, and comprehension of oral, written, and sign language.

== History ==
In the United States, adult aural rehab started as a result of the number of soldiers who incurred hearing loss in World War II and were in need of services. Back then, audiologists and speech-language pathologists would put emphasis on speech reading (lip-reading) auditory training, and would fit the soldiers with very primitive hearing aids. In the past, the main components of the rehab process were training clients in lip-reading techniques and listening exercises. Today, the list includes a thorough hearing evaluation, intervention with hearing instruments, and counseling for the client before and after the hearing device is selected.

== Types of aural rehabilitation therapies ==
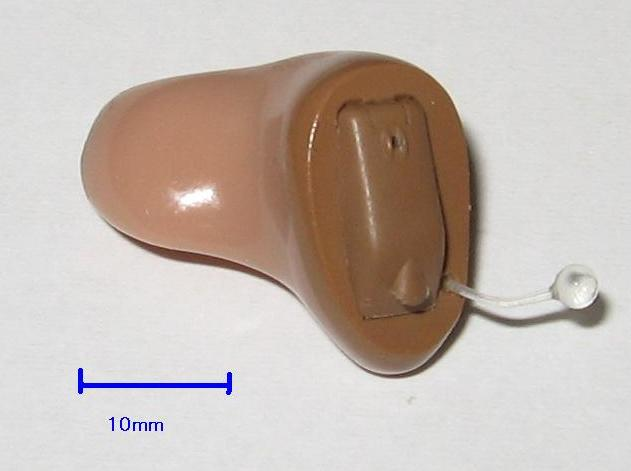
Hearing Aid

- Hearing aid orientation: The process of providing education and therapies to persons (individual or group) and their families about the use and expectations of wearing hearing aids to improve communication.
- Listening strategies: The process of teaching hard of hearing persons common and alternative strategies when listening with or without amplification to improve their communication.
- Speechreading: The process of using or teaching the understanding communication using visual cues observed from the speaker's mouth, facial expressions, and hand movements.
- Auditory Training: The process of teaching an individual with a hearing loss the ability to recognize speech sounds, patterns, words, phrases, or sentences via audition.
- Unisensory: Therapy philosophy that centers on extreme development of a single sense for improving communication.
- Cued speech: The process of using and teaching manual hand or facial movements used to supplement an auditory-verbal approach to the development of communication competence.
- Total communication: The process of using and teaching speech, language, and communication skills simultaneously using manual communication, speech, and hearing.
- Manual communication: The process of using and teaching communication via finger-spelling and with a sign language.

== General steps included in the aural rehab of a child (infant, toddler, child) ==
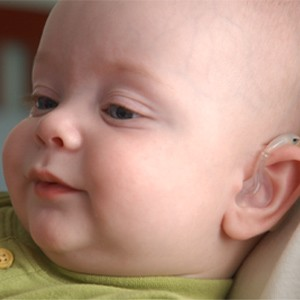
Infant wearing hearing aid

1. Identification of Hearing loss
2. Audiological evaluation
3. Hearing aid and or assistive listening device evaluation and use
4. Parental guidance to select appropriate therapy program
5. Early intervention program
6. Communication skill development (auditory, speech/language, sign)
7. Literacy development (cognition, writing, reading)

Regardless of treatment method for an infant, toddler, or child, the following problems have to be considered:

1. Perceptual problems
2. Communication problems (aural, oral, manual)
3. Literacy problems (cognitive, memory, dexterity)
4. Social, emotional, psychological problems
5. Education and vocational placement problems
6. Family and societal problems

== General steps included in an aural rehab program for an adult ==
Adult programs differ from child programs because adults typically have a later onset of significant hearing loss; they have acquired a worldly knowledge, and have experienced normal speech/language development. Consequently, treatment and therapy strategies are much different compared with a child.

1. Assessment and impact of hearing loss
2. Assessment for the use of hearing aids and or assistive listening devices
3. Assessment of listening strategies and speech reading skills
4. Developing a treatment program including the family
5. Delivery of the treatment program
6. Outcome measures

Treatment strategies for adults center on:

- Hearing aid and or assistive listening device evaluation and orientation
- Providing therapy to maintain speech and language
- Providing therapy to increase listening strategies and speech reading
- Counseling to facilitate adjustment to hearing aid and or assistive listening device and possible psychological, emotional, and occupation impacts of hearing loss

Regardless of whether the aural rehab program is designed for a child or an adult, the members of the hearing care team are the same. The principal members are the audiologist, speech-language pathologist, otologist, and the family physician. Additional members of the hearing care team can include any of the following: educators of the child who is hard of hearing, has mental health counselors, school psychologists, sensory device manufacturers and distributors, social workers, telecommunication and captioning service providers , and vocational counselors .
