= International emergency medicine =

Subspecialty of emergency medicine

International emergency medicine is a subspecialty of emergency medicine that focuses not only on the global practice of emergency medicine but also on efforts to promote the growth of emergency care as a branch of medicine throughout the world. The term international emergency medicine generally refers to the transfer of skills and knowledge—including knowledge of ambulance operations and other aspects of prehospital care—from developed emergency medical systems (EMSs) to those systems which are less developed. However, this definition has been criticized as oxymoronic, given the international nature of medicine and the number of physicians working internationally. From this point of view, international emergency medicine is better described as the training required for and the reality of practicing the specialty outside of one's native country.

Emergency medicine has been a recognized medical specialty in the United States and other developed countries for nearly forty years, although these countries' EMSs did not become fully mature until the early 1990s. At that point, some of its practitioners turned their attention from developing the specialty at home to developing it abroad, leading to the birth of international emergency medicine. They began to support the growth of emergency medicine worldwide, doing so through conferences, national and regional emergency medicine organizations, relief and development organizations, international emergency medicine fellowships, physician exchanges, information transfer, and curriculum development.

Most developing countries are taking steps to develop emergency medicine as a specialty, to develop accreditation mechanisms, and to promote the development of emergency medicine training programs. Their interest is a result of improved healthcare, increasing urbanization, aging populations, the rising number of traffic fatalities, and heightened awareness of emergency medicine among their citizens. In addition, emergency medicine is useful in dealing with time-sensitive illnesses, as well as improving public health through vaccinations, interventions, training, and data collection. Countries that lack mature EMSs are developing emergency medicine as a specialty so that they will be able to set up training programs and encourage medical students to pursue residencies in emergency medicine.

Some challenges faced in international emergency medicine include immature or non-existent training programs, a lack of adequate emergency transport, a shortage of resources to fund emergency medicine development, and an absence of research that could inform developing countries how to best spend the resources they devote to emergency medicine. Additionally, the standards and methods used in countries with mature EMSs are not always suited for use in developing countries due to a lack of infrastructure, shortage of funds, or local demographics. Ambulances, the developed country standard, are costly and not practical for the road conditions present in many countries; instead, a variety of modes of transportation are used. Furthermore, in place of expensive medication and equipment, developing countries often opt for cheaper if slightly less effective alternatives. Although it may seem that increasing availability to emergency medicine must improve health, there is little empirical evidence to directly support that claim or to point out which methods are most effective in improving patient health. Evidence-based medicine seeks to address this issue by rigorously studying the effects of different interventions instead of relying on logic or tradition.

== Background ==
=== Definition ===
The most commonly accepted definition of international emergency medicine is that it is "the area of emergency medicine concerned with the development of emergency medicine in other countries." In that definition, "other countries" refers to nations that do not have a mature emergency care system (exemplified by board-certified emergency physicians and academic emergency medicine, among other things). Included in those nations are some that are otherwise quite developed but lack a complete emergency medical system, such as Armenia, China, Israel, Nicaragua, and the Philippines. Work in international emergency medicine can be broken down into two main categories: 1) the promotion of emergency medicine as a recognized and established specialty in other countries, and 2) the provision of humanitarian assistance.

William Burdick, Mark Hauswald, and Kenneth Iserson have criticized the above definition as oxymoronic, given the international nature of medicine and the number of physicians working internationally. From that point of view, international emergency medicine is not solely about development of emergency medical systems but is instead better described as the training required for and the reality of practicing the specialty outside of one's native country.

=== History ===
==== Emergency medicine ====
Emergency medicine is a specialty that was first developed in the United States in the 1960s. For the United States, the high number of traffic and other accident fatalities in the 1960s spurred a white paper from the National Academy of Sciences; it exposed the inadequacy of the current emergency medical system and led to the establishment of modern emergency medical services. The United Kingdom, Australia, Canada, Hong Kong, and Singapore followed shortly thereafter, developing their respective emergency medicine systems in the 1970s and 1980s.

==== Beginning of the subspecialty ====
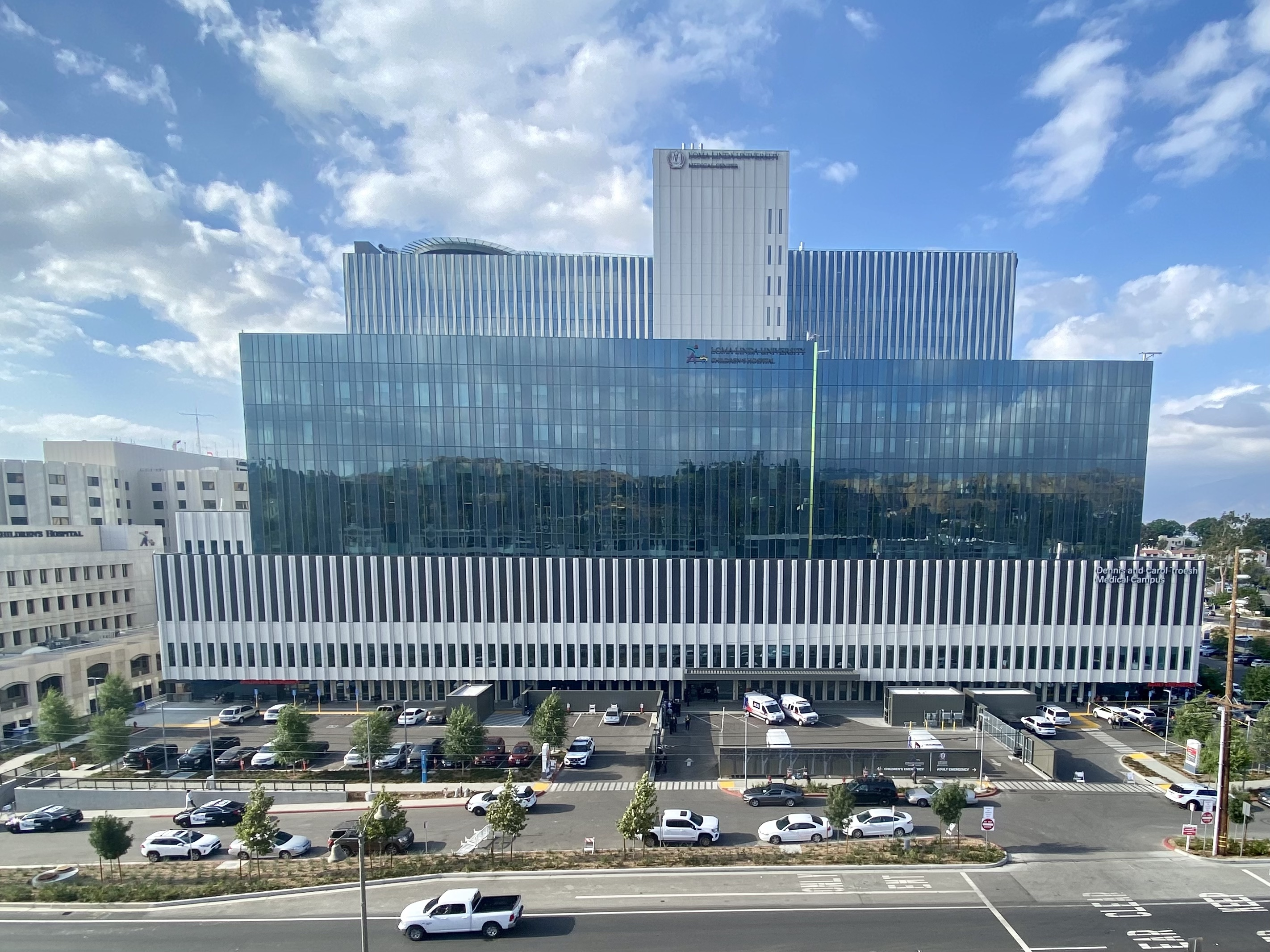
In 1994, Loma Linda University Medical Center established the first international emergency medicine fellowship in the world.

By the early 1990s, the emergency medicine systems (EMSs) in the United States, the United Kingdom, Australia, Canada, Hong Kong, and Singapore were largely mature, leading some practitioners to focus on developing the specialty in other countries. Thus, international emergency medicine as a subspecialty began in the 1990s, although some isolated efforts to achieve some of its goals had taken place in the late 1980s. There were several reasons for the heightened interest these practitioners had in developing emergency medicine abroad. One was the contrast between the EMSs of their countries and the EMSs of other countries. Another was the revolutions of 1989, overthrowing authoritarian regimes, which facilitated spread of new ideas, such as emergency medicine.

Two international emergency medicine conferences were launched in the 1980s, the International Conference on Emergency Medicine (ICEM) and the World Association for Disaster and Emergency Medicine Conference (WADEM). ICEM was founded by the International Federation of Emergency Medicine, while WADEM was started by an organization of the same name. Additionally, in the 1990s various national and regional emergency medicine organizations began supporting the development of the specialty in other countries, including the American College of Emergency Physicians, the European Society for Emergency Medicine, and the Asian Society of Emergency Medicine.

Furthermore, countries without mature EMSs began taking more interest in developing them. One reason for this interest was the overall improvement in healthcare in these countries. Another was the increasing urbanization taking place worldwide and the corresponding shift of focus from infectious diseases to trauma and cardiorespiratory diseases, which are better managed by emergency medicine than prevention. In addition to these developments, the aging population in many countries has led to an increased need for emergency medical services. Also, American popular culture, particularly television shows, and "the demonstrated success of emergency medicine" in countries with mature EMSs both led the public in many countries to expect better emergency medical care.

International emergency medicine organizations, whether focused on relief or development, have also contributed to the growth of the subspecialty. Relief organizations, such as Doctors Without Borders or AmeriCares, serve countries that do not have mature EMSs when health catastrophes occur. These organizations also serve to "enhance [the specialty's] image in the international public eye". Some development organizations, such as Emergency International or the International Federation for Emergency Medicine, help establish and develop emergency care systems in other countries by providing "ongoing educational and organizational assistance."

=== Emergency medicine in the developing world ===
Motor vehicle crashes were a major factor that led to the development of emergency medicine in the United States, the United Kingdom, Australia, Canada, Hong Kong, and Singapore, and they are a major factor leading countries to develop their own emergency medical systems today. Such crashes represent a leading cause of death for adolescents and young adults, with the majority of deaths occurring in the developing world. In recent decades, while traffic fatalities have declined in industrialized nations, they have been on the rise in developing ones. Furthermore, developing nations tend to have a higher proportion of fatalities per number of vehicles for various reasons, including lower safety standards for vehicles. The lack of available emergency care in many developing countries only serves to exacerbate this problem. This higher rate of accident mortality per vehicle exists despite the fact that there are fewer cars in Asia and Africa than in the West. Odero et al. argue that this shows a need to improve emergency medical care.

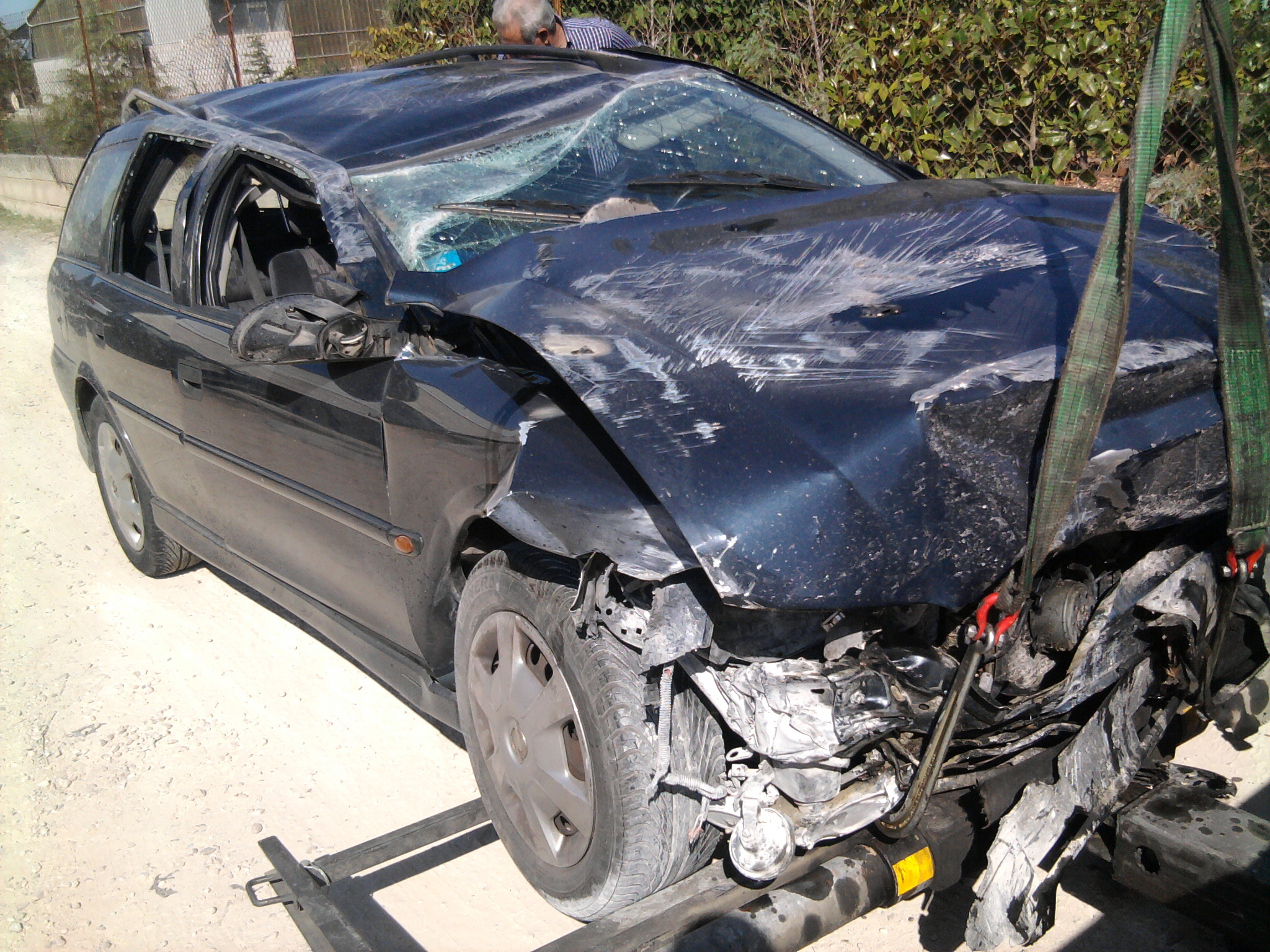
Motor vehicle accidents such as this one are more likely to be fatal in developing countries than in developed ones.

Emergency medical care applies to other acute health problems as well. Many illnesses with time-sensitive elements are common in developing countries, including severe infections, hypoxia caused by respiratory infections, dehydration caused by diarrhoea, intentional and unintentional injuries, postpartum bleeding, and acute myocardial infarction. These are potentially life-threatening conditions, yet effective treatment is often unavailable for much of the world's population.

For instance, a 2008 study of medical systems in Zambia published by the International Anesthesia Research Society found that only 50 percent of hospitals had an emergency medical system that transported patients. Just 24 percent of ambulances carried oxygen, with only 40 percent carrying drugs of any kind. Furthermore, only 29 intensive care beds were available in all of the hospitals surveyed, and these were only found in major hospitals. This implies that the majority of critically ill patients are receiving care in general hospital wards.

Anderson et al. argue that, aside from acute care, emergency medicine can also play a significant role in public health. Vaccinations for many diseases such as diphtheria, tetanus and pertussis can be administered by emergency departments, patients can be targeted for specific interventions such as counseling for substance abuse, and conditions like hypertension can be detected and treated. Emergency departments are excellent locations to train health care providers and to collect data, because of the high number of patients. Emergency medicine also improves public health by preventing secondary disease developing from an initial presentation (initial symptoms), and it serves as the first line of defense in disaster scenarios.

=== Models of emergency care ===
There are two primary models of emergency medicine: the Anglo-American model, which relies on "bringing the patient to the hospital", and the Franco-German model, which operates through "bringing the hospital to the patient". Thus, in the Anglo-American model, the patient is rapidly transported by non-physician providers to definitive care such as an emergency department in a hospital. Conversely, the Franco-German approach has a physician, often an anesthesiologist, come to the patient and provide stabilizing care in the field. The patient is then triaged directly to the appropriate department of a hospital. The Anglo-American model is seen in nations such as Australia, Canada, Ireland, New Zealand, the United Kingdom, and the United States, while the Franco-German model is found in European countries such as Austria, France, Germany, Poland, Portugal, and Russia. Most developing emergency medical systems, including those of China, Japan, the Philippines, South Korea, and Taiwan, have been established along Anglo-American lines, but little work exists to establish the advantage of either system.

Jeffrey Arnold and James Holliman have criticized the use of these descriptors for emergency medical systems as an oversimplification and a needless source of controversy. Instead, Arnold and Holliman have proposed that other groupings be used, such as classifying emergency medical systems as following a specialty or multidisciplinary model. Specialty systems would include those with physicians dedicated to emergency medicine, whereas multidisciplinary systems would encompass those that rely on physicians from other disciplines to provide emergency care. Such an approach would seek to categorize pre-hospital care separately from in-hospital systems. Within Arnold and Holliman's understanding of emergency care models, there is also an acknowledgement that current Western models may be inadequate in the context of developing nations. For instance, a cost–benefit analysis found that creating an EMS system in Kuala Lumpur that met U.S. standards for cardiac arrest response (85 percent of patients receive defibrillation within 6 minutes) would cost US$2.5 million and only save four neurologically intact lives per year. The primary variable responsible for that result is the relatively young demography of Kuala Lumpur, meaning that comparatively few cardiac-related deaths occur.

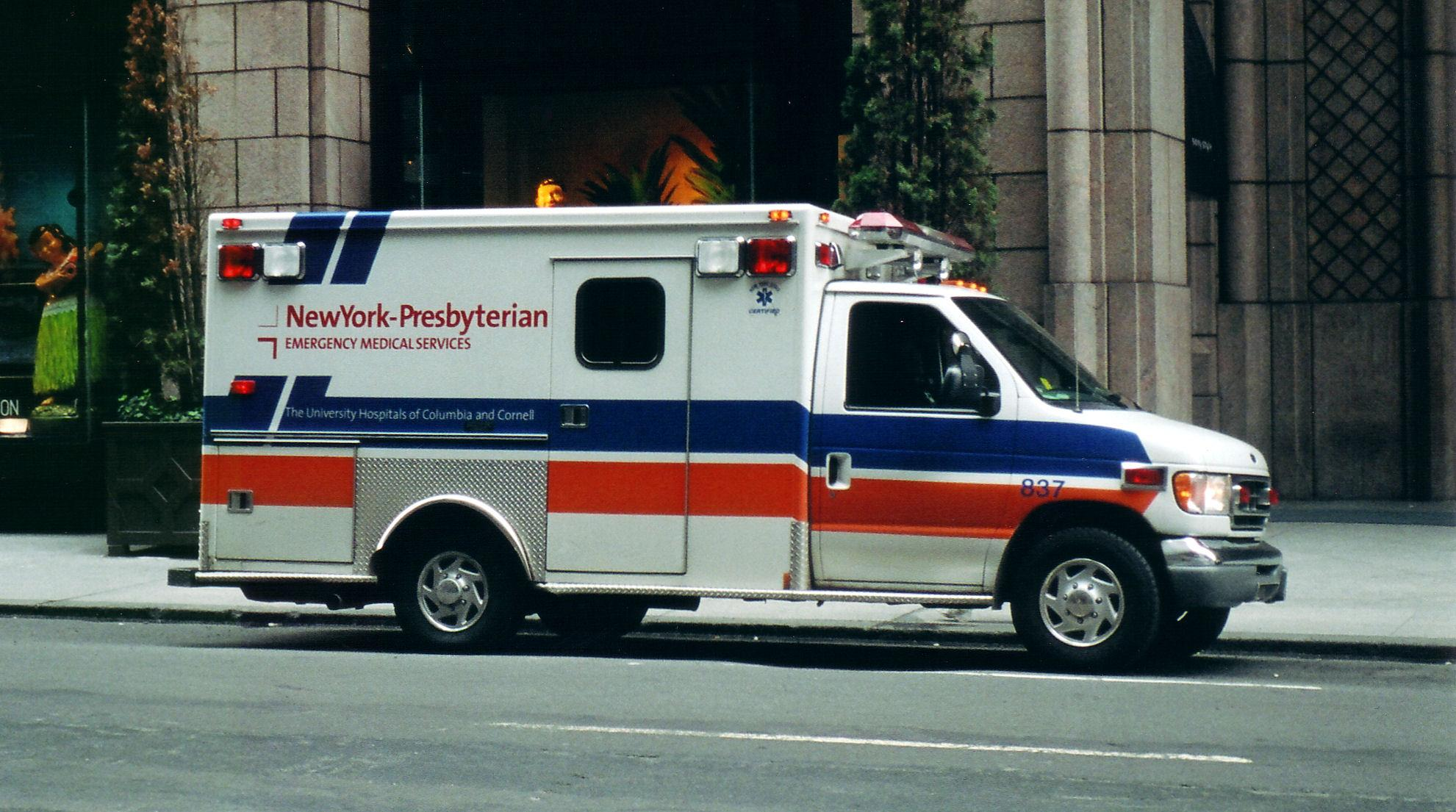
An ambulance like this one is too expensive and impractical for use in many developing countries.

An example of a developing nation establishing its own model of emergency medicine may be seen in southern Brazil. Elements of both of the major conventional models have been incorporated, with the EMS system following French influences and the ambulances being staffed by physicians, while an American approach to emergency medical residency training is also present.

== Role in overall health system ==
=== Developed countries ===
In developed counties, training programs specifically relating to the international practice of emergency medicine are now available within many emergency medicine residencies. The curriculum that should be covered by such programs has been the subject of much discussion. Patient care, medical knowledge, practice-based learning, communication skills, professionalism, and system-based practice are the basic six competencies required of programs approved by the Accreditation Council for Graduate Medical Education, but the application of these goals can take many forms. The breadth of skills needed in international emergency medicine make it unlikely that one standardized program could fulfill the training needs for every scenario. One Australian study found that the primary topics covered by U.S. fellowship programs were emergency medicine systems development, humanitarian relief, disaster management, public health, travel and field medicine, program administration, and academic skills. Its authors argue that attempting to cover all of those areas may be unrealistic and that a more targeted focus on acquiring necessary skills might be more productive.

After such training is completed, or even without any EMS training, working in or visiting other nations is one way physicians can participate in international emergency medicine. Some physicians choose to pursue their careers overseas, while others opt for shorter trips. For example, a team of U.S. physicians spent seven months helping establish a new emergency department and emergency residency program in Hangzhou, China. Such exchanges can be mutually beneficial. For instance, 23 to 28 percent of all physicians in Australia, the United States, the United Kingdom and Canada received their training at medical schools outside of the country in which they currently practice.

=== Developing countries ===
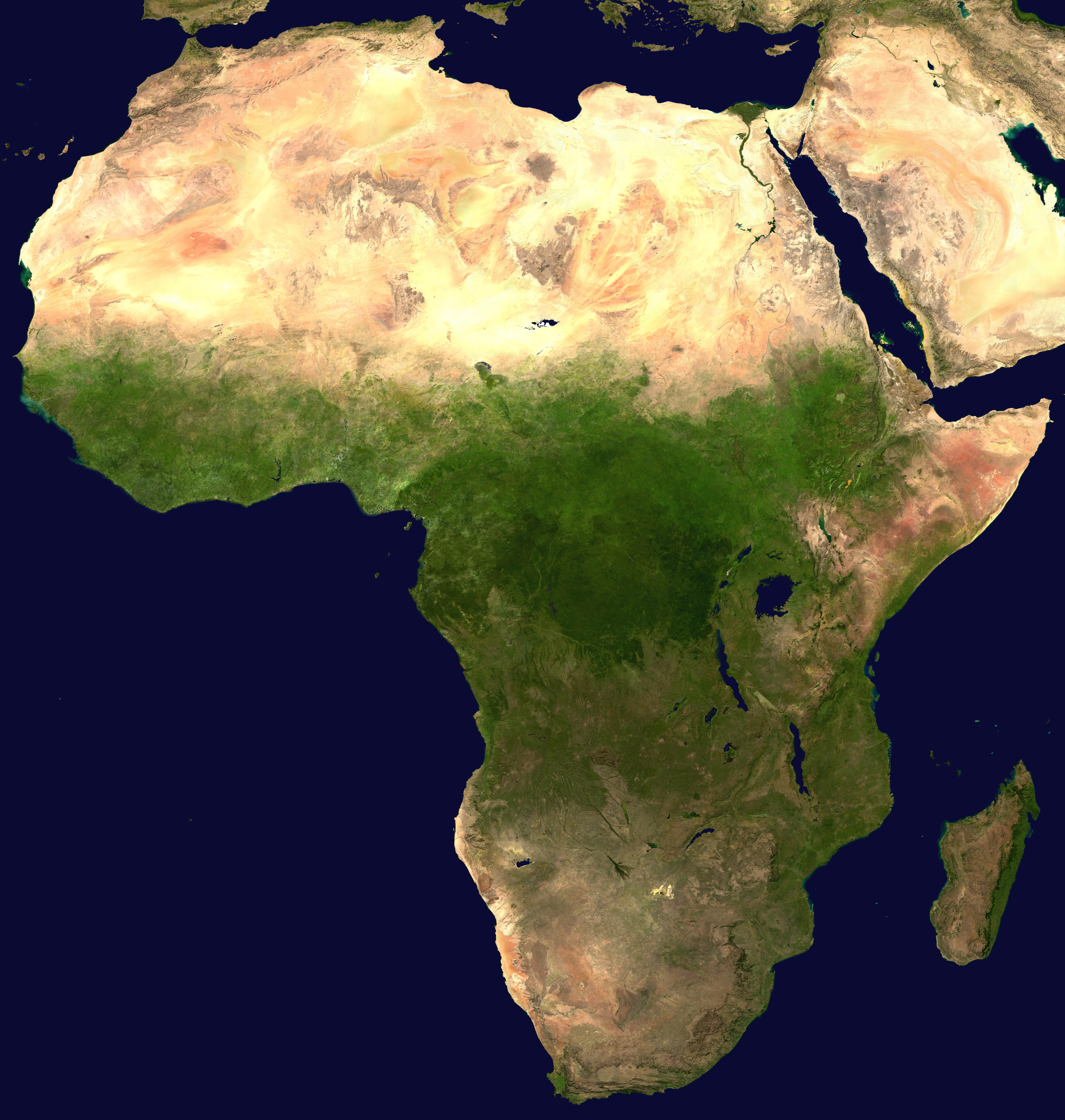
According to Alagappan et al., Africa is the continent most in need of developing emergency medical systems.

The experience of international emergency medicine in developing countries is in some ways the opposite of that of developed ones. As of the 2000s, developing countries are attempting to establish effective systems of care and recognized specialty programs with assistance from health care providers from the developed world. In 2005, there were only a few countries with advanced emergency medical systems, and a far greater number (50+) that were in the process of developing those systems. The process of development usually begins in academia and patient care, followed by administrative and economic concerns, and finally health policy and agendas.

Given the limited resources of many developing nations, funding vitally effects how emergency medicine fits into the health system. Preventive care is a crucial part of healthcare in developing countries, and it may be difficult to budget for emergency medicine without cutting into those resources. This is a particular problem for poorer nations such as Zambia, which had a per capita health expenditure of 23 US dollars in 2003. Regardless of the amount of preventive care available, health problems requiring immediate attention will still occur, and emergency medical programs could increase access to care. Kobusingye et al. argue that expanding emergency medicine does not need to be unreasonably expensive, particularly if developing countries focus on low-cost but effective treatments administered by first responders.

== Initiatives to expand emergency medicine ==
=== Curriculum development ===
Hobgood et al. argue that one key component in equipping nations to develop emergency medical systems is to identify the aspects of training that are essential for health care providers. In their view, a standard curriculum is useful for identifying core issues, even if countries have very different needs and resources. To address this goal, the International Federation for Emergency Medicine developed a model curriculum in 2009. This initiative seeks to provide a minimum basic standard that can be tailored to the specific needs of the various nations implementing training in emergency medicine. It is targeted towards all medical students in order to produce a minimum competency in emergency care for all physicians, regardless of their specialty.

=== Transferring knowledge ===
Countries with decades of experience in comprehensive emergency medical systems have expertise that nations that are just beginning emergency medical programs lack. Thus, there exists considerable opportunity for the transfer of knowledge to assist newly founded programs. Such transfers may be made either from a distance or in person. For instance, the International Emergency Medicine Fellowship at the University of Toronto sent a three-person team to Cluj-Napoca, Romania, to promote the local development of emergency medicine. An assessment of the present status was performed that identified targets for improvement in physical plant organization and patient flow; staffing, staff education, equipment, medication and supplies; and infection control practices. Following these designations, plans regarding these areas were collaboratively drawn up and then implemented, partially through international exchange trips.

Another conduit for the transfer of knowledge is the International Conference on Emergency Medicine, a conference held every two years for worldwide emergency physicians by the International Federation for Emergency Medicine (IFEM). In 2012, the conference took place in Dublin, Ireland. The organization was founded in 1991 by four national emergency physician organizations: the American College of Emergency Physicians, the British Association for Emergency Medicine, the Canadian Association of Emergency Physicians, and the Australasian College for Emergency Medicine. The conference rotated between the founding members until 2010, when it was held in Singapore. Many new members have been accepted since the mid-1990s, when the IFEM decided to open up membership to other nations' emergency medicine organizations; the conference will rotate to them as well. For instance, in 2014 the conference will be hosted in Hong Kong and in 2016 it will be held in Cape Town, South Africa.

There are other conferences on international emergency medicine as well, including the one that the World Association for Disaster and Emergency Medicine (WADEM) has held every two years since 1987. However, WADEM focuses more on disaster medicine than emergency medicine system development, and many of its member physicians are not specialists in emergency medicine. Additionally, the European Society for Emergency Medicine (EuSEM) has hosted an annual conference since 1998. EuSEM also publishes The European Journal of Emergency Medicine, develops recommendations for emergency medicine standards for European countries, and supports a disaster medicine training center and degree program in San Marino. The Asian Society for Emergency Medicine (Asian Society), which was founded in 1998, holds its own biennial conference. In addition to that, the Asian Society, like the EuSEM, develops curriculum recommendations for Asian countries.

=== Developing emergency medicine as a specialty ===
One way to advance emergency medical care is to obtain the recognition of emergency medicine as a specialty in countries that currently lack it. Without such recognition, it is difficult to set up training programs or recruit potential students, as they face the uncertainty of training to obtain a credential that may end up being useless to them. Recognition increases the visibility and prestige of the profession and promotes other efforts to advance its development. Botswana may serve as a case study. Its recent recognition of emergency medicine as a specialty has been closely accompanied by the creation of the Botswana Society for Emergency Care, the establishment of a Resuscitation Training Centre and a Trauma Research Centre at the University of Botswana, and the formation of a committee to design a national policy for pre-hospital care.

An alternate route for developing emergency medicine is to provide additional training for other specialists to equip them to practice in emergency medicine. This has the benefit of being more rapid to implement, as physicians already trained in other areas can add the necessary emergency skills to their repertoire. However, after the initial expansion it is difficult for emergency medicine to progress further in nations that adopt this strategy, as the retrained practitioners identify more with their original specialty and have less incentive to continue to press for further innovations in emergency medicine.

== Challenges ==
=== Training ===
Educational opportunities in emergency medicine are not available in many countries, and even when present, they are often in their infancy. Botswana opened its first medical school in 2009, with a program in emergency medicine following in 2011. The program aims to train four to six physicians in emergency medicine each year. Limitations on in-country training mean that the program includes six months of training at an international site. The organization of the program is modeled on South Africa's program due to the similarities in resource constraints and disease burdens and the eagerness of College of Emergency Medicine of South Africa and Emergency Medicine Society of South Africa to support the expansion of emergency medicine. Two years of clinical practice are required before entering the residency program, as in the South African and Australian approaches.

To deal with this shortage of educational opportunities, Scott Weiner et al. suggest that countries with developed emergency medical systems should focus on training the trainers. This, he believes, is a sustainable approach to promote the development of emergency medicine worldwide. It works by sending developed country health care workers to equip a small group of trainees with the necessary skills to then go on and teach the concepts to others. As such, it may be able to leverage the insights of developed emergency medical systems while remaining sustainable, as the newly trained trainers continue to spread the knowledge. The Tuscan Emergency Medicine Initiative is an example, with physicians from other specialties currently working in emergency departments being taught how to teach a new group of emergency medical specialists.

=== Emergency transport ===
The limitations on resources available in developing countries are particularly evident in the area of emergency transport. Ambulances, the developed country standard, are costly and not practical for the road conditions present in many countries. Indeed, there may be no roads at all. One study found that modes of transport as diverse as motorboats, canoes, bicycles with trailers, tricycles with platforms, tractors with trailers, reconditioned vehicles, and ox carts were used for emergency transport.

In more advanced developing countries, establishing ambulance transport systems is more feasible, but still requires considerable expertise and planning. Prior to 2004, Pakistan did not have an organized emergency medical system. In that year, Rescue 1122 was launched as a professional pre-hospital emergency service, and it has managed to achieve an average response time of 7 minutes, comparable to that of developed nations. Some of the critical factors in its success included local manufacture of vehicles, training instructors to certify emergency medical technicians, adopting training materials to the local context, and branching out to include fire and rescue service response under a united command structure.

=== Resources ===
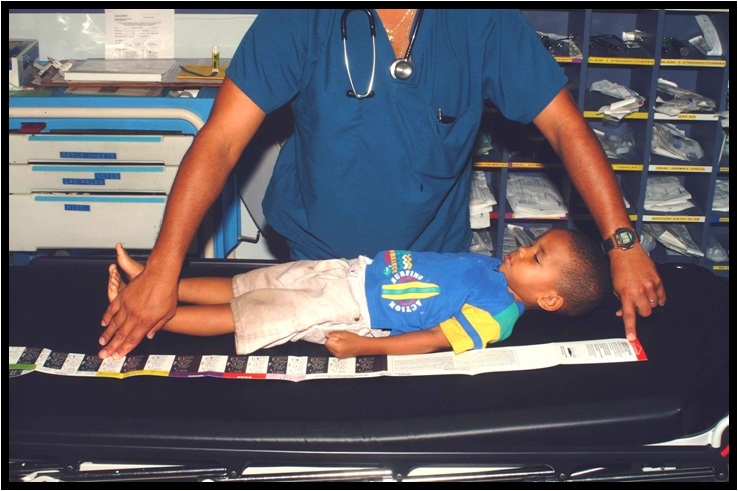
Broselow tape

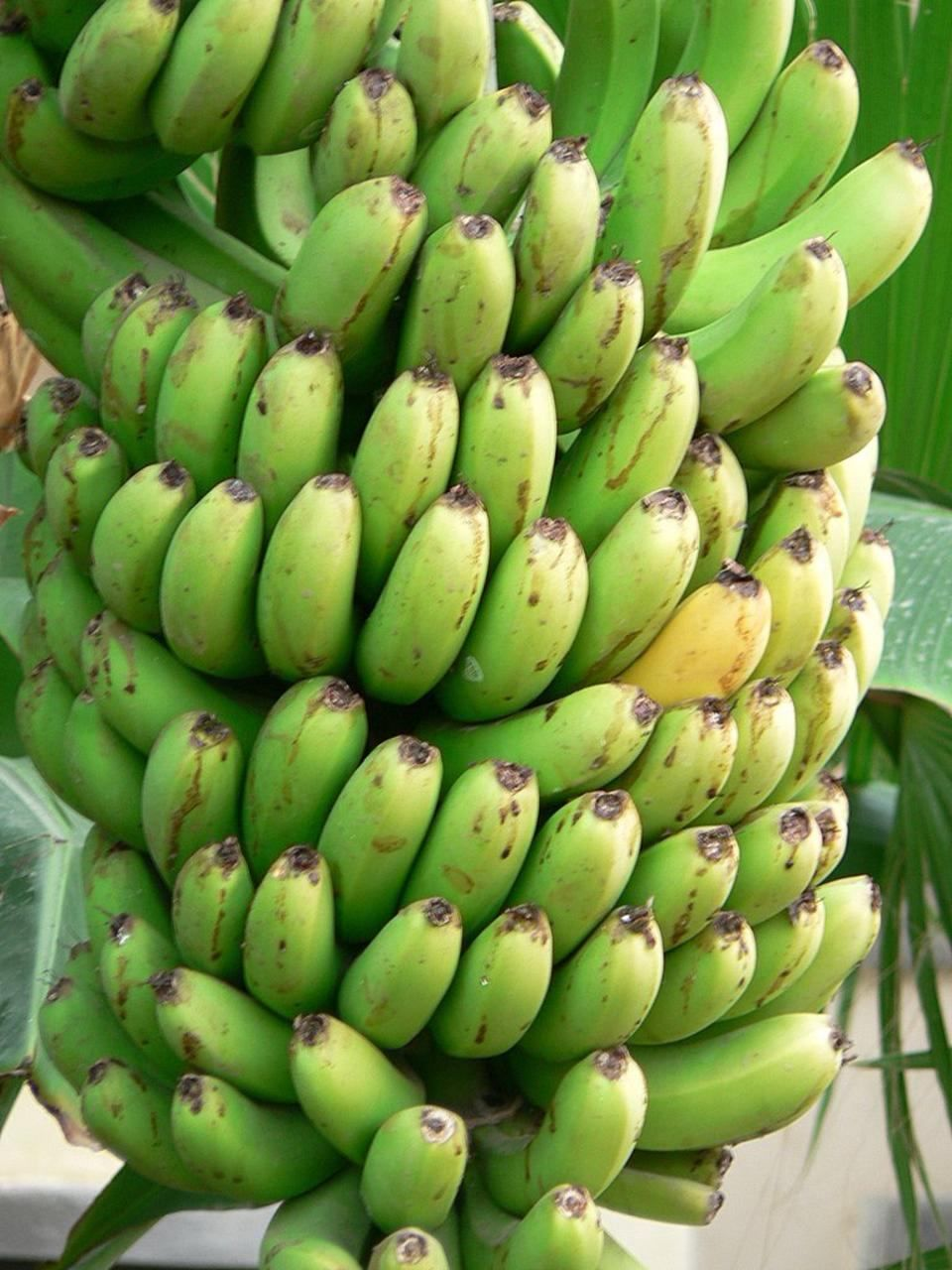
Green bananas

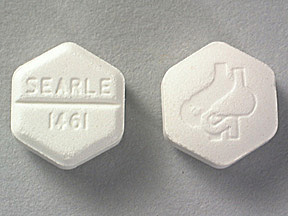
Misoprostol pills

Alternative treatments for resource-constrained environments

The vital nature of coping with the lack of resources available in international emergency medicine may be seen in the proportion of scientific articles that grapple with the topic. Of the top 27 articles identified by a review of the international emergency medicine literature from 2010, 14 were classified as dealing with the practice of emergency medicine in resource-constrained environments. A new dimension of thought is that of the isolated subject of technology for trauma care as published in the World Journal of Surgery by Mihir Shah et al. Topics covered included the use of the Broselow tape as the best estimate for children's weight, green bananas as an effective treatment for diarrhea, and misoprostol as a potential alternative for postpartum hemorrhage when oxytocin is not available.

=== Lack of research ===
Despite the thought that increasing availability to emergency medicine will improve patient outcomes, little empirical evidence exists to directly support that claim, even in developed countries. Between 1985 and 1998 only 54 randomized controlled trials related to emergency medical services were published, implying that much of the current standard of care rests upon meager support. A similar lack of direct proof exists for the effectiveness of international assistance in promoting emergency medicine in other countries. Although it may seem that such efforts must improve health, the failure to quantify international emergency medicine's impact renders it more difficult to identify the best practices and target areas in which the most benefit may be achieved.

A development in recent years that seeks to address these issues has been termed evidence-based medicine. As its name suggests, this approach strives to rigorously study the effects of different interventions instead of relying on logic or tradition. Jeffrey Arnold argues that its application worldwide could lead to the boon of sharing best practices between emergency medicine practitioners in various countries, thus advancing the current standard of emergency care.
