= Lee A. Wallis =

Lee Alan Wallis
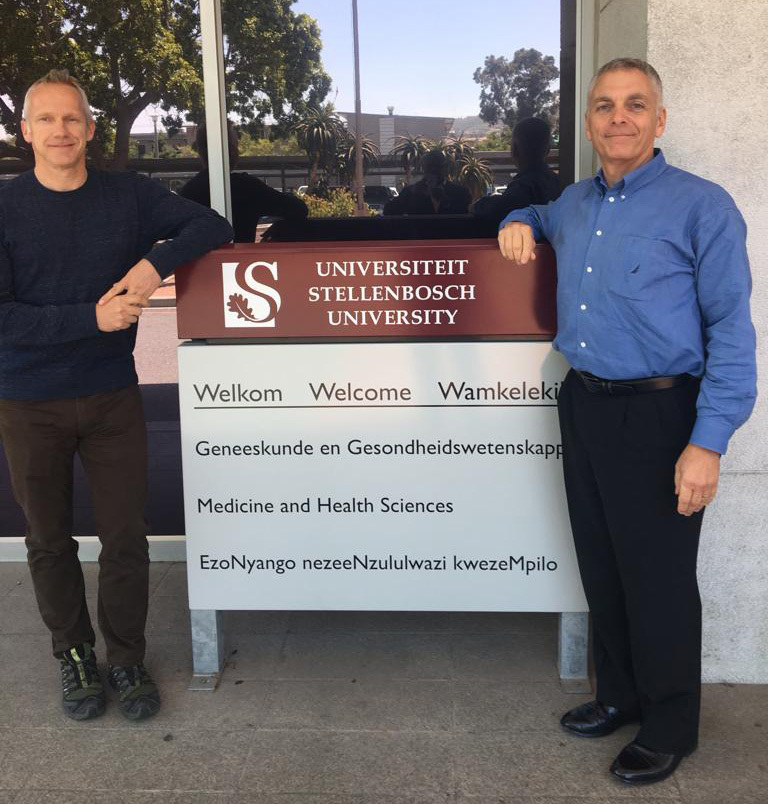
- Wallis (left)
- Education: University of Edinburgh (MB ChB)
- Occupations: Head of Emergency Medicine for the Western Cape Government; Professor of Emergency Medicine
- Medical career
- Institutions: University of Cape Town; Stellenbosch University
- Research: Emergency Medicine

Lee Alan Wallis is the lead, Emergency Care for the World Health Organization in Geneva, a position he's held since 2022. Prior to that he was the South African Head of Emergency Medicine for the Western Cape Government, Professor and Head of the Division of Emergency Medicine at the University of Cape Town and Stellenbosch University, and the founding President of the African Federation for Emergency Medicine.

== Education ==
In 1993, Wallis earned his MB ChB from the University of Edinburgh, subsequently serving in the Royal Navy for his postgraduate training.

In January 2002, he relocated to Cape Town to complete a qualification as a Fellow of the College of Emergency Medicine, which he earned in 2003. Wallis graduated with MD specializing in Pediatric Disaster Triage in 2006.

== Career ==
Wallis became a full Professor at Stellenbosch in 2011, and a full Professor at the University of Cape Town in 2012. His division of emergency medicine comprises 48 speciality registrars, 80 masters and 25 PhD students.

Wallis is responsible for the provincial EMS system in the Western Cape and for 40 hospital emergency centers. Previously, Wallis led the re-design of ten emergency centers in South Africa. Wallis has been an advocate for the expansion of Emergency Medicine as a medical specialty across Africa throughout his career and as a result of his research, has been involved in the development of emergency care systems in several countries across Africa and consults widely for institutions, organizations, and governments in the region.

== Research ==
As of April 2019, Wallis has contributed more than 200 peer-reviewed publications and has been cited 2,867 times in the literature, achieving a h-index of 30. He is an expert on emergency care system setup in low- and middle-income countries. He co-developed the EFAR System Model, published in 2012.

Wallis serves as Editor in Chief of the African Journal of Emergency Medicine and was a contributing author for Disease Control Priorities 3 (DCP3), authoring the chapter on "Strengthening Health Systems to Provide Emergency Care."

== Honors and awards ==
Wallis previously served as the President of the International Federation for Emergency Medicine (IFEM), and is currently on the board of directors. Wallis is also a past President of the Emergency Medicine Society of South Africa.

== Personal life ==
Wallis is married to Abbi Wallis and has two children. He lives on a farm and in his spare time has set up a guest house, restaurant, and boutique winery, which produced Wellington’s first 5-star wine.
