= International Conference on Emergency Medicine =

The International Conference on Emergency Medicine (ICEM) is a biennial conference on international emergency medicine for emergency physicians. It is organised by the International Federation for Emergency Medicine.

== History ==
The first ICEM was held in London in 1986 as a collaborative effort between the American College of Emergency Physicians (ACEP), the British Association for Emergency Medicine (BAEM), the Canadian Association of Emergency Physicians (CAEP), and the Australasian College for Emergency Medicine (ACEM). It rotated between the United States, the United Kingdom, Canada, and Australia until 2010, when it was held in Singapore.

Emergency Medicine Journal calls ICEM a major international emergency medicine conference, while Kumar Alagappan and C. James Holliman refer to IFEM as "probably the most active, broad-based, international organization dealing with international EM [emergency medicine] development issues."

== Locations ==
The International Conference on Emergency Medicine (ICEM) was held every 2 years. From 2019 it will be changed to a yearly conference.

List of International Conferences on Emergency Medicine
Number	Year	City	Country	Dates
1st	1986	London	United Kingdom	
2nd	1988	Brisbane	Australia	
3rd	1990	Toronto	Canada	
4th	1992	Washington D.C.	United States	
5th	1994	London	United Kingdom	
6th	1996	Sydney	Australia	
7th	1998	Vancouver	Canada	
8th	2000	Boston	United States	
9th	2002	Edinburgh	United Kingdom	
10th	2004	Cairns	Australia	
11th	2006	Halifax	Canada	
12th	2008	San Francisco	United States	
13th	2010	Singapore	Singapore	
14th	2012	Dublin	Ireland	
15th	2014	Hong Kong	Hong Kong	
16th	2016	Cape Town	South Africa	
17th	2018	Mexico City	Mexico	
18th	2019	Seoul	Korea	12 June 2019 to 15 June 2019
19th	2020	Buenos Aires	Argentina	15 June 2020 to 18 June 2020
20th	2021	Dubai	United Arab Emirates	8 June 2021 to 11 June 2021
21st	2022	Melbourne	Australia	19 June 2022 to 23 June 2022
22nd	2023	Amsterdam	The Netherlands	14 June 2023 to 17 June 2023
23rd	2024	Taipei	Taiwan	19 June 2024 to 23 June 2024
24th	2025	Montreal	Canada	24 May 2025 to 28 May 2025
25th	2026	Hamburg	Germany	9 June 2026 to 13 June 2026

== See also ==
- Emergency medicine
- International emergency medicine
- EUSEM Congresses
