= ICEM =

ICEM can refer to:

- International Federation of Chemical, Energy, Mine and General Workers' Unions
- International Organization for Migration, previously known as the Intergovernmental Committee for European Migration
- International Conference on Emergency Medicine
- International Council for Educational Media
- International Confederation of Electroacoustic Music
