= African Journal of Emergency Medicine =

- Discipline: Emergency medicine
- Language: English
- Edited by: Stevan R. Bruijns, Lee A. Wallis

Publication details
- History: 2011-present
- Publisher: Elsevier on behalf of the African Federation for Emergency Medicine
- Frequency: Quarterly
- Open access: Yes
- License: CC BY-NC-ND

Standard abbreviations
- ISO 4: Afr. J. Emerg. Med.

Indexing
- ISSN: 2211-419X
- OCLC no.: 894639593

Links
- Journal homepage; Journal page at publisher's website; Online archive

The African Journal of Emergency Medicine is a quarterly peer-reviewed open-access medical journal covering research in the field of emergency medicine, with a focus on Africa. The journal publishes research articles, reviews, brief reports of scientific investigations, and case reports as well as commentary and correspondence related to topics of scientific, ethical, social, and economic importance to emergency care in Africa. The editors-in-chief are Stevan R. Bruijns (University of Cape Town) and Lee A. Wallis (University of Cape Town and Stellenbosch University). It is the official journal of the African Federation for Emergency Medicine. In addition, it is the official journal for the Emergency Medicine Association of Tanzania, the Emergency Medicine Society of South Africa, the Egyptian Society of Emergency Medicine, the Libyan Emergency Medicine Association, the Ethiopian Society of Emergency Medicine Professionals, the Sudanese Emergency Medicine Society, the Society of Emergency Medicine Practitioners of Nigeria, and the Rwanda Emergency Care Association. It is also an affiliate journal of the Trauma Society of South Africa and the Namibian Medical Society.

== Abstracting and indexing ==
The journal is abstracted and indexed in EBSCO databases, Embase, Emerging Sources Citation Index, and Scopus.
