= Adrian Boyle =

British Physician and Royal College President

Adrian Boyle is a British consultant and emergency physician at Addenbrooke's Hospital, Cambridge, England. In October 2022, he succeeded Katherine Henderson as the President of the Royal College of Emergency Medicine.

== Education ==
Adrian Boyle qualified as a doctor from the University of Southampton and undertook house jobs in Southampton and Portsmouth. The registrar for his Portsmouth house job was former Royal College President Clifford Mann. He also undertook medical training in Tygerberg and holds a masters in epidemiology and biostatistics, as well as a Doctorate on domestic violence, both from the University of Cambridge.

== Research and career ==
Prior to becoming president, Dr Boyle was previously Vice President of Policy. As Vice President, Boyle highlighted how more than a thousand patients a day, spent at least 12 hours waiting in A&E, during 2021 and called for action and investment in social care. Additionally, Dr Boyle was a key author of the report produced by RCEM in November 2021, which demonstrated that overcrowding and extended stays had seen over 4,500 excess deaths from 2020 to 2021.

As President, Boyle has spoken about the significant risks that excessive waiting times posed to elderly patients, describing hospitals as "lobster traps". He has also highlighted how Ambulances were becoming "wards on wheels" and described the hospital system as 'collapsing'. In December 2022, he spoke about the anxieties within the healthcare sector, surrounding the nurses' and ambulance strikes, and criticised NHS bosses' recommendation for hospitals to free up more beds.

In the same month Dr Boyle issued a statement alongside four other medical royal colleges calling for the UK government to increase and prioritise investment in ambulance services, mental health, primary care and social care.

In January 2023, Dr Boyle told the Health Select Committee that December 2022 had been the NHS' worst-ever December.

In July 2023, Dr Boyle criticised the NHS England's urgent and emergency care winter plan, writing in the Independent that it will do little to resolve the current situation.

In September of the same year, Boyle branded Emergency Department waiting times as a 'matter of national shame'.

In April, 2024, Boyle warned that excessively long waits continued to 'put patients at risk of serious harm'.

== Selected publications ==
- Boyle, Adrian; Beniuk, Kathleen; Higginson, Ian; Atkinson, Paul (2012-02-07). "Emergency Department Crowding: Time for Interventions and Policy Evaluations". Emergency Medicine International. 2012 e838610. doi:10.1155/2012/838610. ISSN 2090-2840. PMC 3290817. PMID 22454772.
- Morris, Zoë Slote; Boyle, Adrian; Beniuk, Kathleen; Robinson, Susan (June 2012). "Emergency department crowding: towards an agenda for evidence-based intervention: Figure 1". Emergency Medicine Journal. 29 (6): 460–466. doi:10.1136/emj.2010.107078. ISSN 1472-0205. PMID 21653203. S2CID 24828857.
- Oram, Siân; Abas, Melanie; Bick, Debra; Boyle, Adrian; French, Rebecca; Jakobowitz, Sharon; Khondoker, Mizanur; Stanley, Nicky; Trevillion, Kylee; Howard, Louise; Zimmerman, Cathy (June 2016). "Human Trafficking and Health: A Survey of Male and Female Survivors in England". American Journal of Public Health. 106 (6): 1073–1078. doi:10.2105/AJPH.2016.303095. ISSN 0090-0036. PMC 4880235. PMID 27077341.
- Boyle, Adrian; Higginson, Ian (2018-08-01). "This emergency department crisis was predictable-and partly preventable". BMJ (Clinical Research Ed.). 360: k64. doi:10.1136/bmj.k64. ISSN 0959-8138. PMID 29311156. S2CID 3514046.
- Boyle, Adrian (2022). "Welcome to your new hospital". British Medical Journal. 378 o1907. doi:10.1136/bmj.o1907. ISSN 1756-1833. PMID 35918099. S2CID 251227590.
