= European Society for Emergency Medicine =

- Abbreviation: EUSEM
- Formation: 1994
- Type: INGO
- Legal status: Scientific organization
- Purpose: Promote emergency medicine
- Location: Antwerp, Belgium
- Region served: Europe
- Website: https://www.eusem.org

The European Society for Emergency Medicine (EUSEM) is an organisation promoting international emergency medicine in Europe. The society was founded at the International Conference on Emergency Medicine in May 1994 in London. EUSEM brings together over 30 European national societies of emergency medicine. EUSEM hosts pan-European emergency medicine training, examinations and awards. It also publishes the European Journal of Emergency Medicine, and organises annual scientific meetings.

It is an ex-officio member of the International Federation for Emergency Medicine.

== EUSEM Congresses ==
Until 2014 EUSEM hosted a congress every 2nd year, alternating with a Mediterranean Emergency Medicine Congress co-hosted with the American Academy of Emergency Medicine (AAEM).

List of EUSEM Congresses
Year	City	Country	Dates	Title
1994	London	United Kingdom		Inaugural meeting at ICEM 1994
1996	Mainz	Germany		Working afternoon during WADEM Congress
1998	San Marino	San Marino		1st European Congress on Emergency Medicine
2000	Wroclaw	Poland		Eastern European Conference on Emergency Medicine
2001	Stresa	Italy		1st Mediterranean Emergency Medicine Congress in collaboration with AAEM
2002	Portoroz	Slovenia		2nd European Congress on Emergency Medicine
2003	Sitges	Spain		2nd Mediterranean Emergency Medicine Congress in collaboration with AAEM
2004	Prague	Czech Republic		European Society for Emergency Medicine 10th Anniversary Symposium
2005	Leuven	Belgium		3rd European Congress on Emergency Medicine in association with the BeSEDiM
2005	Nice	France		3rd Mediterranean Emergency Medicine Congress in collaboration with AAEM
2006	Crete	Greece		4th European Congress on Emergency Medicine in association with the Anaesthesiology Department of the University of Crete, Greece
2007	Sorrento	Italy		4th Mediterranean Emergency Medicine Congress in collaboration with AAEM
2008	Munich	Germany		5th European Congress on Emergency Medicine in association with DGINA
2009	Valencia	Spain		5th Mediterranean Emergency Medicine Congress in collaboration with AAEM
2010	Stockholm	Sweden		6th European Congress on Emergency Medicine in association with SweSEM
2011	Kos	Greece		6th Mediterranean Emergency Medicine Congress in collaboration with AAEM
2012	Antalya	Turkey		7th European Congress on Emergency Medicine in association with EPAT
2013	Marseille	France		7th Mediterranean Emergency Medicine Congress in collaboration with AAEM
2014	Amsterdam	Netherlands		8th European Congress on Emergency Medicine in association with NVSHA
2015	Torino	Italy		9th European Congress on Emergency Medicine in association with SIMEU
2016	Vienna	Austria		10th European Congress on Emergency Medicine
2017	Athens	Greece		11th European Congress on Emergency Medicine
2018	Glasgow	United Kingdom		12th European Congress on Emergency Medicine in association with RCEM
2019	Prague	Czech Republic	12 October 2019 to 16 October 2019	13th European Congress on Emergency Medicine
2020	Copenhagen	Denmark	19 September 2020 to 23 September 2020	The European Emergency Medicine Congress
2021	Lisbon	Portugal	27 October 2021 to 31 October 2021	The European Emergency Medicine Congress
2022	Berlin	Germany	15 October 2022 to 19 October 2022	The European Emergency Medicine Congress
2023	Barcelona	Spain	16 September 2023 to 20 September 2023	
2024	Copenhagen	Denmark	13 October 2024 to 16 October 2024	in association with the Danish Society for Emergency Medicine

== See also ==
- International Conference on Emergency Medicine
- International Federation for Emergency Medicine
