= CAEP =

CAEP may refer to:

- Canadian Association of Emergency Physicians
- Chinese Academy of Engineering Physics
- Condom-associated erection problem
- Council for the Accreditation of Educator Preparation
