= Goodbye Barcelona =

- Music: K. S. Lewkowicz
- Lyrics: K. S. Lewkowicz
- Book: Judith Johnson
- Basis: The International Brigades
- Premiere: 2011: Arcola Theatre
- Productions: 2011 London, 2013 Barcelona
- Awards: Best Spanish Musical

Goodbye Barcelona is a British stage musical with music and lyrics by K.S. Lewkowicz and a book by Judith Johnson. The musical is inspired by the true story of the International Brigades and tells the story of 18 year old Sammy from London's East End, who goes to Spain to help fight against the fascists in the Spanish Civil War in 1936. It made its world premiere at the Arcola Theatre in November 2011 followed by a Catalan production in Barcelona at the Teatre Del Raval from October 2013 to January 2014, which won the Best Spanish Musical award.

== Development ==
Goodbye Barcelona was originally inspired by a Guardian article in November 2000, containing interviews with many of the British International Brigaders alive at that time. Following the success of their musical Release The Beat in 2004, Johnson and Lewkowicz, guided by the Arcola Theatre's artistic director Mehmet Ergen, began work on what was to become Goodbye Barcelona in 2005. The musical was developed over 6 years with several readings.

The writers received a development grant in 2006 from the Arts Council to research and produce a first draft, and went on to meet several of the International Brigaders then still alive. These included Lou Kenton, Jack Jones, Penny Feiwel, Alun Menai Williams and Sam Lesser. Based on extensive research into the subject including books and films as well as the interviews with the Brigaders, Johnson and Lewkowicz then developed a first draft for the initial 2008 reading, directed by Mehmet Ergen at Arcola Theatre's Grimeborn Festival in 2008. This was attended by leading Spanish Civil War historian Sir Paul Preston and 92 year old International Brigader Sam Lesser amongst others.

Further readings and revisions, directed by Karen Rabinowicz, took place in 2009 for a second reading at Grimeborn followed by a third reading in 2010 at the Royal Academy of Music. A launch and fundraising campaign took place at the European Commission in March 2011 hosted by author Victoria Hislop with guest speakers including Paul Preston. The event was jointly sponsored by the Spanish Embassy and the Catalan Delegation with representatives from both in attendance and received nationwide media coverage in Spain. Following the launch, the musical opened at the Arcola Theatre on 24 November 2011 with the help of a production grant from the Arts Council.

== Productions ==
=== Arcola Theatre 2011 ===
The world premiere was at the Arcola Theatre in London's Off West End in 2011 for an initial 5 week run. Reviews included the Guardian, the Morning Star and the Observer as well as reviews in Spanish media such as La Vanguardia and El Punt avui. It was directed and choreographed by Karen Rabinowicz, designed by Nigel Hook with lighting by Rob Halliday, sound design by Mike Walker and musical direction by Mark Smith.

=== Teatre del Raval 2013-2014 ===
A Catalan language production opened in 2013 at the Teatre del Raval directed by Fran Arraez and produced by Empar López. The lyrics were translated by David Pinto and the book by Eva Rosell and dramaturg Carlos Be. Stage design was by Abdón Alcañiz, costume design by Giovanna Riber, with lighting by Pedro Guerrero, sound design by Rafel Febrer and musical direction by Dani Campos. Musical supervision was by Mark Smith. The show played to full houses after receiving superlative reviews in El Punt Avui, La Vangardia and El Periódico amongst others.The production won several awards in 2014, including Best Spanish Musical and Best Director. A Catalan cast recording of selections from the show was released on iTunes in 2013. Forthcoming productions are planned in Germany and Mexico.

== International showings, workshops, readings and recordings ==
=== Barcelona ===
The Catalan cast recording of selections from the show is available on iTunes.

=== New York ===
The script was further developed in New York as part of the Developmental Reading Series at the York Theatre Company for a reading in May 2014 directed by Hans Friedrichs, who encouraged the writers to further develop the script and include some elements from an earlier version. This is the version currently being used.

=== Mexico ===
A live presentation of excerpts from the musical was given at Radio UNAM in Mexico City in November 2016. and at Centro Cultural de España in May 2019. A Spanish language hip hop remix of the title song was released in Mexico in October 2019, produced by rapper and producer Jerónimo Gorráez.

=== Germany ===
The script was translated into German by Hartmut H. Forche for a forthcoming German production.

=== Film ===
The film of the London production has been shown in New York, Madrid, Barcelona, Berlin, Hamburg, Mexico City and London.

== Plot ==
18 year old Sammy Abramski has just taken part in the Battle of Cable Street in October 1936, successfully helping to stop Oswald Mosley and the British Union of Fascists from marching through London's largely Jewish East End. Sammy is inspired by this victory to want to continue to fight against the rising tide of fascism sweeping across Europe. Against his mother's wishes, he leaves home to join the International Brigades who are helping to defend the Spanish Republican Government against the fascist military coup in the Spanish Civil War.

Sammy's mother Rebecca, trapped in a failing marriage, misses her son so much that she too decides to leave for Spain, working as a nurse for the Brigades whilst searching for Sammy.

Sammy meets fellow Brigaders, the more cynical older campaigner Jack, a First World War veteran, and tough young idealist George, who both take him under their wing. They discuss their various attitudes and motivations for volunteering.

Sammy meets Pilar, a young woman trying to survive in war torn Barcelona, and they are instantly and deeply attracted to each other. Rebecca meets Ernesto, a charismatic Anarchist, and nurses him when he is wounded. He helps her in the search for her son.

Despite the many privations of the Brigaders as well as clashing with Jack who mocks his youthful ideals, Sammy still believes that he has no choice but to be there to help fight the fascists and George agrees and supports him.

Sammy is wounded and later loses contact with Pilar who has no one to turn to, whilst Rebecca and Ernesto keep searching for Sammy.

Although they become aware that they are losing the war, they are all inspired by the words of La Pasionaria, the living embodiment of the Republic who exhorts them to stay strong and keep fighting.

Sammy and Pilar are passionately reunited, while Rebecca and Ernesto realise that they love each other. Sammy writes a letter to his mother and gives it to Pilar for safekeeping.

The war is almost lost and the International Brigades are due to be repatriated, all with very mixed emotions. Sammy and Jack are sheltering from a barrage of gunfire and when Sammy asks Jack why they even came, Jack repeats his own motivational words back to him. In the final climactic scene, La Pasionaria gives her iconic speech in tribute to the Brigaders gathered in the farewell parade in Barcelona.

== Musical Numbers ==
=== Act 1 ===
- “Prologue/They Shall Not Pass” – Company
- “I Have To Go To Spain” – Sammy & Rebecca
- “Getting To Spain – Company”
- “La Pasionaria’s Welcome” – La Pasionaria and Company
- “Factions” – Sammy, Jack and George
- “Let Me Be Strong” – Pilar and Sammy
- “Training Song” – Sammy, Jack, George and Company
- “El Escorial” – Rebecca
- “No Time” – Pilar and Sammy
- “You’ll Learn” – Jack
- “All That We Have Is Now” – Company

=== Act 2 ===
- "We Have To Win” – La Pasionaria and Company
- “Franco’s Nuts” – Sammy, Jack, George and the Brigaders
- “Retreat From Belchite” – Sammy, Jack, George and the Brigaders
- “In Spanish” – Ernesto and Rebecca
- “Crossing The Ebro” – Sammy
- “In Spanish” – reprise – Ernesto and Rebecca
- “Goodbye Barcelona” – George, Jack, Pilar and Company
- “La Pasionaria’s Farewell” – La Pasionaria and Company

== Cast and characters ==
Character	London 2011	Barcelona 2013
Sammy	Tom Gill	Pau Quero
Rebecca	Lucy Bradshaw	Maria Carme/Mateu Ribo
George	Jack Shalloo	Joan Vázquez / Victor Genestar
Jack	Mark Meadows	Pep Papell
La Pasionaria	Laura Tebbutt	Manuela Nieto/Patricia Paisal
Pilar	Katie Bernstein	Carol Rovira
Ernesto	John Killoran	Antonio del Valle
Ensemble	Ifan Gwilym-Jones, Jassy Grez, Alex Rand, Flora Wellesley Wesley	Gara Roda, David Mauricio

== Awards ==
2013:

- Best Spanish Musical
- Best Director (Fran Arraez)
- Best New Actor (Antonio del Valle)
