= St Mary Redcliffe and Temple School =

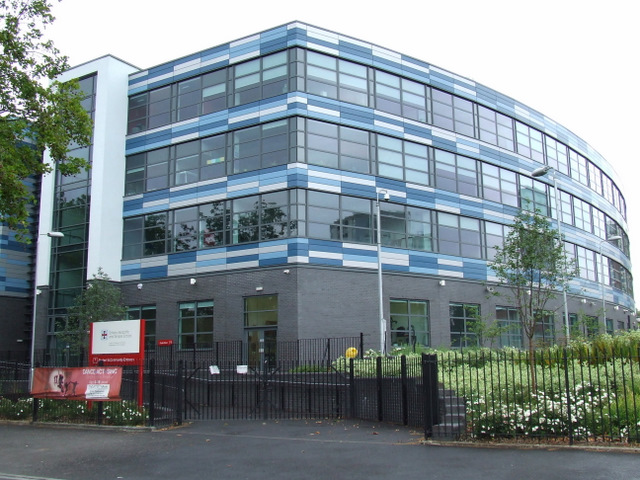

Location
- Somerset Square; Bristol, BS1 6RT; England
- Coordinates: 51.4464°N 2.5880°W

Information
- Type: Voluntary aided
- Motto: A Christian Community Committed To Excellence
- Religious affiliation: Church of England
- Established: 1571 (St Mary Redcliffe Grammar School) 1710 (Temple Colston School) 1856 (Redcliffe Endowed School) 1966 (St Mary Redcliffe and Temple School)
- Founder: Queen Elizabeth I
- Local authority: Bristol City Council
- Department for Education URN: 109327 Tables
- Ofsted: Reports
- Head teacher: Del Planter
- Gender: Mixed
- Age: 11 to 18
- Enrolment: 1,669
- Capacity: 1,530
- Houses: Johnson, Franklin, Equiano, Liddell, Müller
- Colour
- Website: www.smrt.bristol.sch.uk

St Mary Redcliffe and Temple School (informally referred to as 'St Mary Redcliffe', 'Redcliffe' or 'SMRT') is a Church of England voluntary aided school situated in the district of Redcliffe, Bristol, England. It provides education for approximately 1,600 students aged 11 to 18. The school's church is St Mary Redcliffe. It is one of only two Church of England voluntary aided secondary schools in the Diocese of Bristol along with the Deanery CE academy in Swindon, although other schools do maintain a Church affiliation. The school was formed in 1966 by a merger of St Mary Redcliffe Secondary School and Temple Colston school. The headteacher is Del Planter and the Head of Sixth Form is Rob Shaw.

== History ==
=== St Mary Redcliffe Grammar School ===
St Mary Redcliffe school was founded as Queen Elizabeth's Free Grammar and Writing School by letters patent on 30 June 1571 when it was granted a Royal charter by Elizabeth I. The charter granted the parishioners of St Mary Redcliffe Church the building of the Chapel of the Holy Ghost for the establishment of the school; the building had previously belonged to the Hospital of St John the Baptist, a religious foundation in Redcliffe, but had been confiscated by the Crown during the dissolution of the monasteries. The building was located in the Churchyard of St Mary Redcliffe, near the south porch, and was sized 56 feet by 26 feet. The charter made the provision for one master and one under-master, supervised by twelve governors and for the 'education, teaching and instruction of boys and youth in grammar and learning'. It received an endowment from John Whitson in 1627. In the 1760s the school building was torn down as it was felt it spoilt the view of the church, and with the acceptance of the Bishop of Bristol, Thomas Newton, the school moved into the Lady Chapel in the east end of the church. The school was recorded in 1839 as possessing a statue of its founder Elizabeth I.

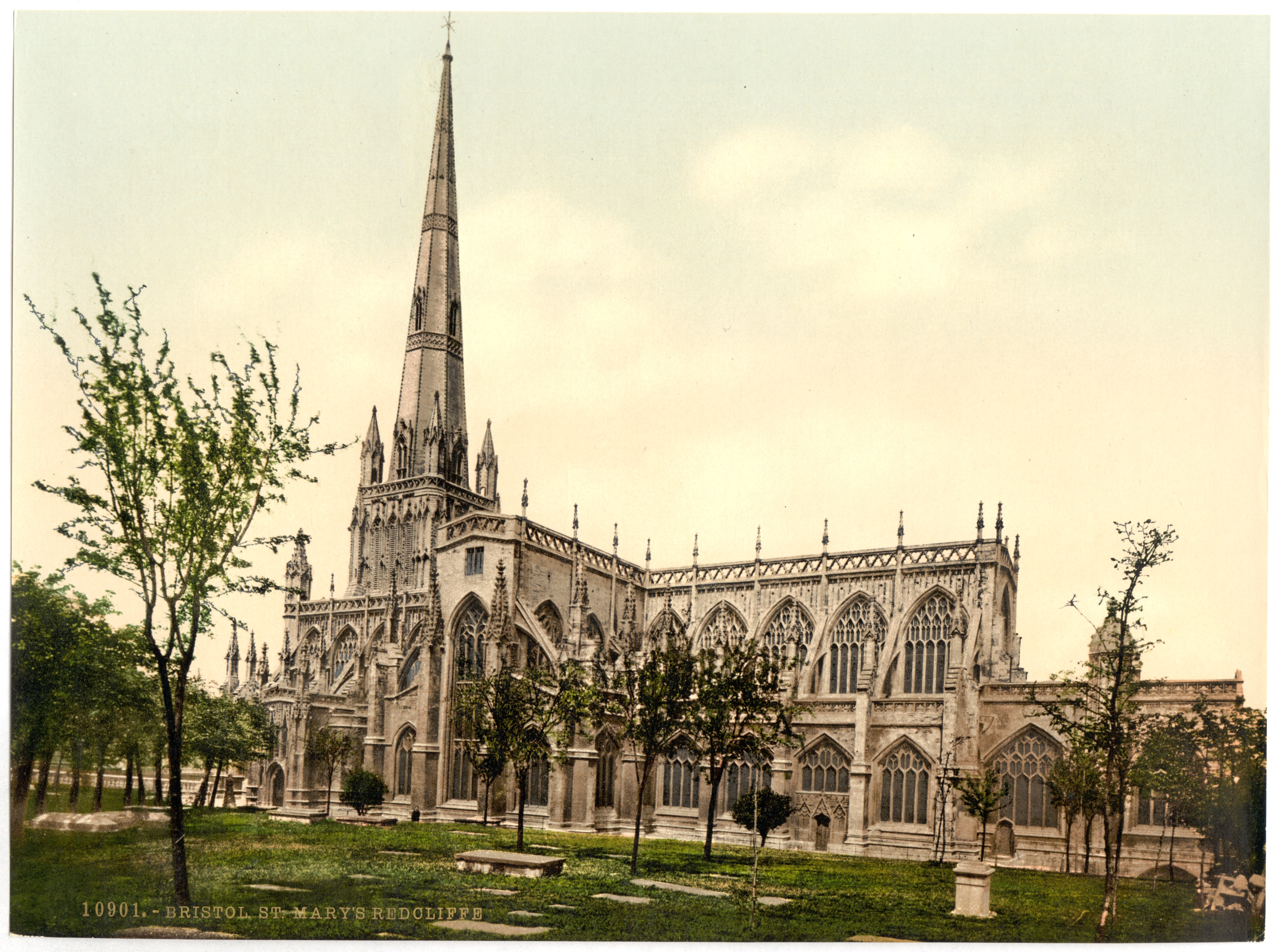
St Mary Redcliffe Church in the 1890s

The 1828 Charity Commission report inspected the school and found that there had been no free scholars on the schools foundation, and not more than one private scholar, since the appointment of the then current master in 1813; and conclude that the school had been of little benefit to the parish for over thirty years. They recommended that the school should be revived. The 1864 Schools Inquiry Commission, often known as the Taunton Report, inspected the school and reported that the Grammar School had "ceased to have any visible existence", and the school's endowments from the Church and John Whitson were accumulating as there was no school or master for them to be given to. The report recommended that the funds allotted to the school instead be given to Bristol Grammar School.

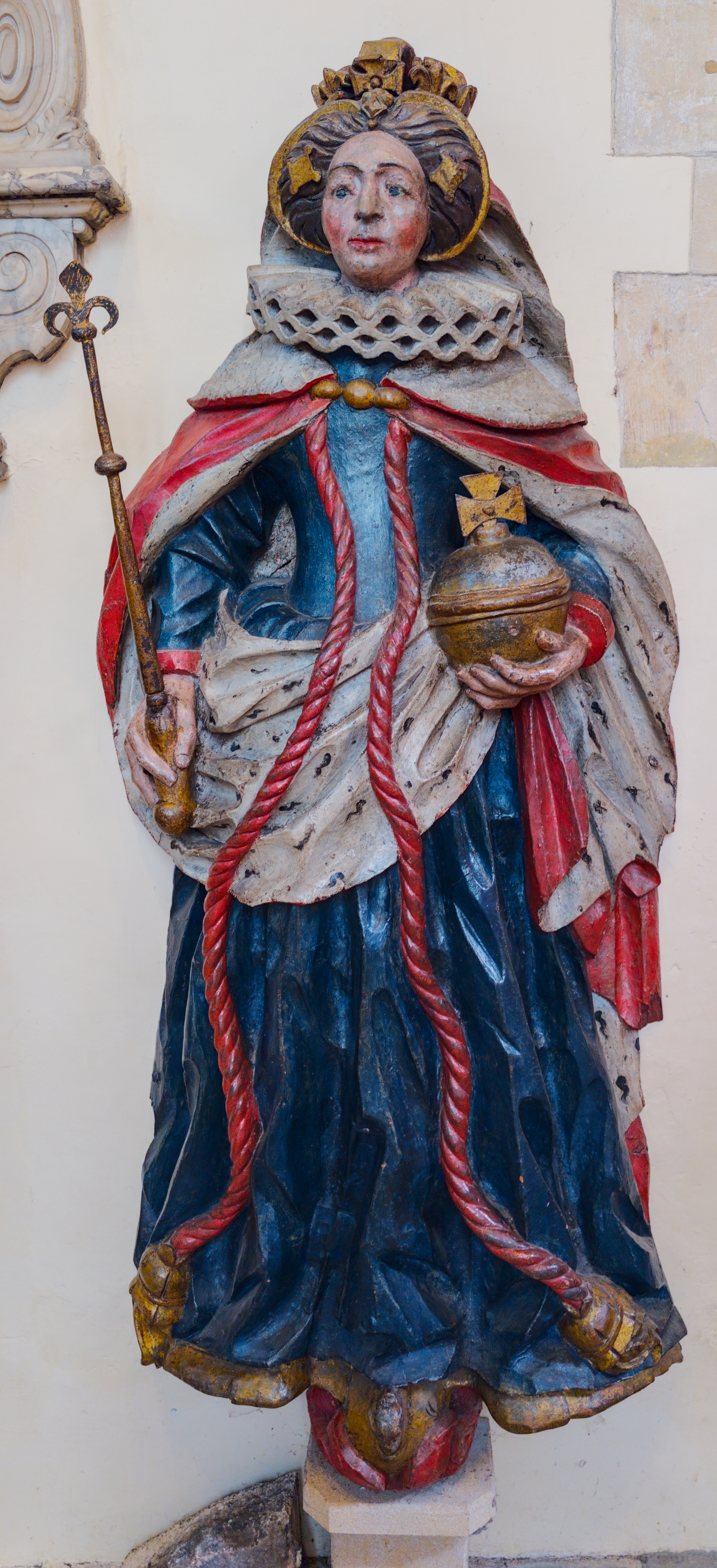
The statue of the school founder, Elizabeth I, in St Mary Redcliffe Church

=== Temple Colston School ===
Colston's Free School in Temple Street was founded by Arthur Bedford, the vicar of Temple Church in 1709. In 1711 Edward Colston endowed it with an annual fund of £80 for the education and clothing of forty boys of the parish and erected a schoolhouse. In an 1841 report of the Charity Commission the teaching provided was said to be in reading, writing, ciphering and the Church catechism. The school later opened to girls as well.

=== Redcliffe Endowed School ===
In 1856 the Redcliffe Endowed School was founded under a scheme of the Charity Commissioners at a site on Redcliffe Hill on land previously used as the vicarage orchard. Initially co-educational, the girls left in 1879 and the School was renamed the Redcliffe Endowed Boys' School, only to be renamed again to St Mary Redcliffe Secondary School during the 1940s.

=== Merger of the schools ===
St Mary Redcliffe Secondary School merged with Temple Colston School in 1966, creating the co-educational St Mary Redcliffe and Temple school as a comprehensive voluntary aided school. New buildings were constructed in a modernist style at Somerset Square to house the school at a cost of £500,000 and were opened in November 1967 by the then master of University College, Oxford Lord Redcliffe-Maud, whose father had been the vicar of St Mary Redcliffe Church.

In 1988, the Temple Colston annex was added to the school to allow for an expansion of numbers.

In 2008, the school was awarded funding for a substantial rebuild of its main site, under the government's Building schools for the future programme. The construction company Skanska began work on 1 May 2009 and the new school was formally opened to students on 5 November 2010. Over the course of the 18 months much of the existing site was demolished, with new facilities being built to house science, mathematics, English, design technology, music, art photography and physical education.

The school's two mottos are "Steadfast in Faith" (historic) and "A Christian Community Committed To Excellence" (modern). Both reflect the partnership with St Mary Redcliffe Church, and also the official faith of the school. The earlier Redcliffe boys School used the motto "Prayer, Practice, Perseverance and Punctuality", known as the 4 P's.

== Notable former pupils ==
- Jayde Adams, comedian
- Lucy Bradshaw, actor
- Bradley Burrowes, footballer
- Sir (William) Billy Butlin MBE, entrepreneur
- Clifford Mann, OBE, former President of the Royal College of Emergency Medicine
- Moses McKenzie, novelist
- James Morton, footballer
- Chay Mullins, rugby player
- Paul Potts, operatic tenor
- Beth Rowley, singer-songwriter
- Vernon Samuels, Olympic athlete

== Teaching and learning ==
SMRT has over 1,600 students, including approximately 580 in the Sixth Form (years 12–13).

GCSE and 'A' level examination results are generally above the national average. As well as achieving 'Specialist Humanities College' status, SMRT became a Beacon School in 2000, and has also been part of the 'Excellence in Cities' scheme, incorporating 'Gifted & Talented' programmes.

=== Academic achievement ===
The table below shows the percentage of students achieving the government's target of 5 A*-C including English and Mathematics.

2009	2010	2011	2012
76%	70%	77%	68%

=== Sixth form ===
Until 2005 SMRT's sixth form shared the main premises with the rest of the school. The Redcliffe Sixth Form Centre first opened in 2004, and is based in separate facilities on Redcliff Hill. However, some sixth-form lessons still take place in the main school, as this is where the main department rooms, such as the science labs, design technology rooms and music computer rooms and recording studio are.

== School life ==
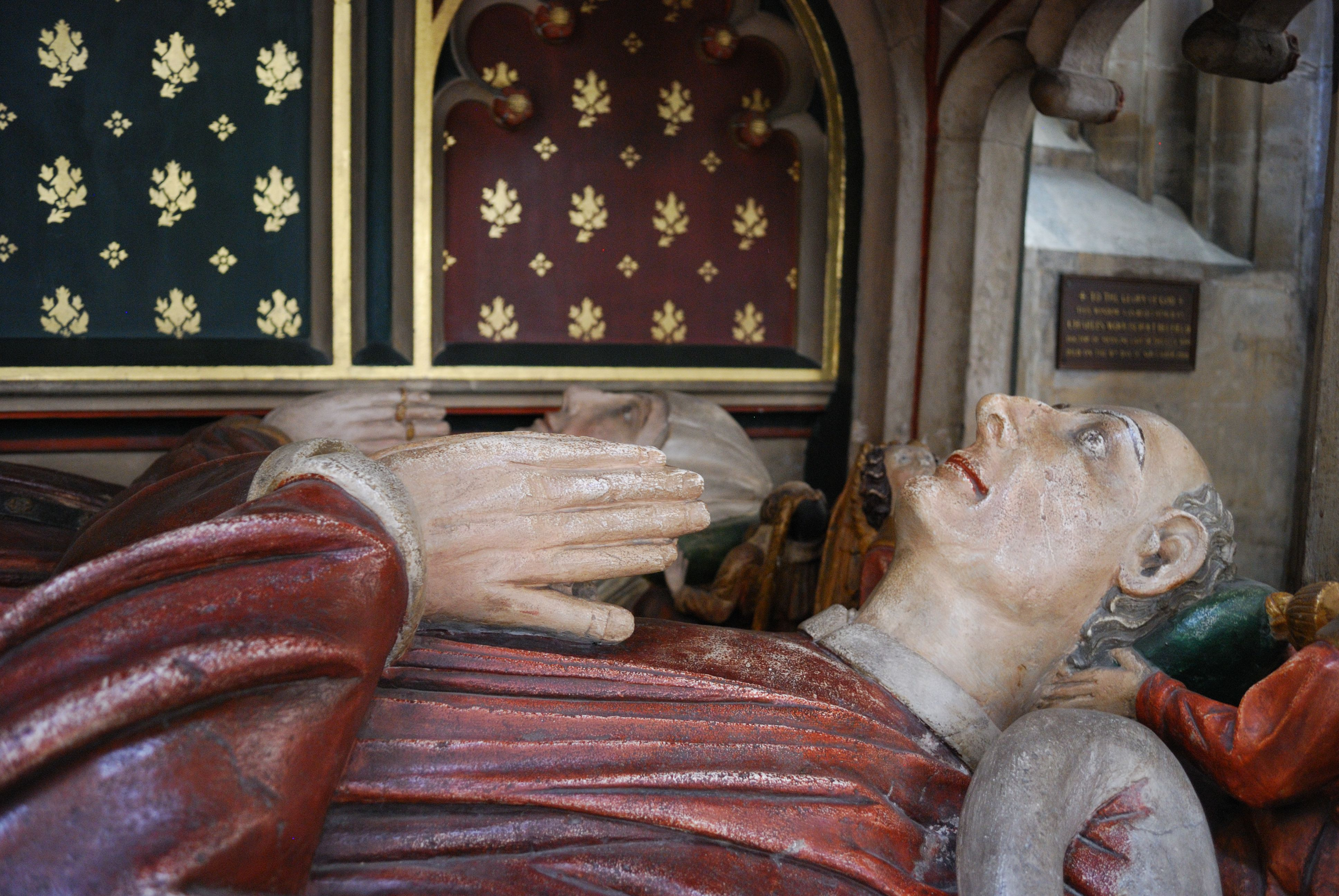
The tomb of William Canynges, an early benefactor of the Church and the namesake of Canynges House

=== Houses ===
St Mary Redcliffe and Temple School has five houses. On entry to SMRT in year 7, students join Müller House (white), which is composed solely of Year 7 students. From year 8 to year 11, they are placed in one of the main four houses: Johnson (red), Franklin (blue), Liddell (yellow) and Equiano (green). These house names have been in use since September 2019.

The previous house names referred to William Canynges, local politician and benefactor of St Mary Redcliffe Church; Edward Colston, merchant, slave trader and founder of Temple Colston School; and J.T. Francombe, a former headmaster of the school and Lord Mayor of Bristol.

In the January 2019 newsletter the school announced the new house names as follows:

- James House became Müller House, named after George Müller, Christian evangelist and director of Ashley Down orphanage
- Canynges House became Liddell House, named after Eric Liddell, Scottish athlete and missionary
- Francombe House became Equiano House, named after Olaudah Equiano, African abolitionist
- Cartwright House became Franklin House, named after Rosalind Franklin, British X-ray crystallographer
- Colston House became Johnson House, named after Katherine Johnson, the African-American NASA mathematician whose calculations were critical to the first US crewed space flights

The changes were implemented in September 2019.

=== Facilities ===
Academic subjects are taught either in the main school building or the Ikoba (formally Temple Colston) Building (opened 1987). SMRT's on-site sports facilities include an indoor swimming pool, a new sports hall, a gym, an outdoor astroturf 'arena', now containing floodlights, which can be used by years 8–11 at break and lunch, and a new basketball and tennis court outside, which can be used by year 7s at break and lunch. Double P.E. lessons used to be held at The Old Redcliffians fields in Brislington, where they were used for football, rugby, hockey and athletics. The school now uses the South Bristol Sports Centre, in addition to holding some double lessons at school, in one of the sports facilities. The school's music facilities include a computer room dedicated to music, classrooms with 'pull out' keyboards and sound proof practice rooms with a piano/keyboard in each. The music department also has a recording studio, although mainly used by years 11–13, and a recital room, which is a big room with a grand piano, drum kit(s), other percussion, and is used as a rehearsal space by students and ensembles and for small concerts.

== Admissions ==
St Mary Redcliffe and Temple School is the only Church of England secondary school in the Diocese of Bristol. It is a comprehensive state school and therefore does not select on academic merit. It is unusual, however, in that entry is not restricted by catchment area; the school serves both the city and the outlying communities of Greater Bristol, for which there are no alternative Church of England schools. It selects students on a range of criteria including church attendance, distance the student lives from school and if they have siblings who already attend the school. However, the school's administration also includes a small number of places for which no church link is required, which are intended for either those who are members of non-Christian religions, or who live within 500 metres of the school.

Within the student body, 10% of students have a language other than English as their first language, and 8% are eligible for free school meals.

== See also ==
- List of the oldest schools in the United Kingdom
