= Fellowship of the Royal College of Emergency Medicine =

Postgraduate emergency medicine qualification in the UK

Fellowship of the Royal College of Emergency Medicine (FRCEM) is a postgraduate medical qualification in the United Kingdom and Ireland awarded by the Royal College of Emergency Medicine (RCEM) to doctors who have completed specialty training in emergency medicine. The exam comprises two parts, the Single Best Answer (SBA) paper, and the Objective Structured Clinical Examination (OSCE), which are normally taken in the latter stages of specialty training in emergency medicine while holding a position as a Specialty Registrar, having already completed the RCEM Membership exam earlier on in the training programme. Obtaining this qualification allows a doctor to become a fellow of the College, as well as entitling them to use the post-nominal letters FRCEM (with continued payment of RCEM fees).

== History ==
Emergency medicine is one of the newer medical specialties in the UK, having only been formally recognised in 1972 with its roots in earlier schemes from the 1950s. The first postgraduate qualification in emergency medicine was the Fellowship of the Royal College of Surgeons of Edinburgh in Accident & Emergency Medicine & Surgery, or the FRCS(Ed) (A&E), established in 1983 and administered by the titular college with input from the Casualty Surgeon's Association established in 1967; this became the MRCS(Ed) (A&E) in the 1990s with the formation of the new MRCS exam to replace the FRCS for doctors in earlier core training posts. This examination would continue to be awarded until 2009.

However, with the formation of the intercollegiate Faculty of Accident & Emergency Medicine in 1993 (parented by the various Royal Colleges of Physicians and Surgeons, as well as the Royal College of Anaesthetists), responsibility for postgraduate training and examination of emergency medicine specialists would move to the new faculty, leading to the creation of a Fellowship of the faculty in 1996 and a Membership in 2003, although few people sat the MFAEM exam and instead earned early medical or surgical qualifications before going on to take the FFAEM. With the transfer of the FAEM and the Casualty Surgeons Association (now renamed the British Association for Accident & Emergency Medicine) to the new College of Emergency Medicine in 2006, these exams became the MCEM and FCEM respectively, eventually becoming the MRCEM and FRCEM when the college received the "Royal" designation in 2015.

Since being established under the RCEM, the examination component sat during early specialty/core training has undergone several changes; in 2016, the MRCEM was merged into the FRCEM, creating a new three-part qualification, consisting of the FRCEM Primary (sat in early specialty/core training), the FRCEM Intermediate, and FRCEM Final. However, this was reversed again in 2021 with the MRCEM again becoming a separate qualification, incorporating the Primary and Intermediate levels of examination.

=== Controversy ===
On the 16th of May 2022, the RCEM revealed that fifty candidates who had sat the SBA section of the FRCEM two months previously had been incorrectly told they had passed the examination, according to the college because of a fault with the electronic exam management system. In response, the college refunded the examination and travel fees of those affected, set up an additional exam diet for them free of charge, and self-referred the issue to the General Medical Council and the Charity Commission.

== Examinations ==
The FRCEM is a required part of specialist training for doctors undertaking General Medical Council (GMC) approved training in the United Kingdom, but it is also taken by doctors from a variety of other countries. In particular, several parts of the examination are held in overseas examination centres in Dublin, Chennai, Hyderabad, New Delhi, Reykjavik, Kuala Lumpur, and Muscat.

=== FRCEM SBA ===
The FRCEM SBA is an examination open to doctors who have a minimum of 1 year experience in higher specialty training (not including core training) and have completed the MRCEM (or the equivalent previous FRCEM Intermediate) within the past 7 years. It consists of 180 single-best answer questions, divided into 2 papers of 2 hours each with an hours break in between, consisting of 35 questions on the management of various medical and surgical presentations, 40 on the resuscitation of the critically unwell patient, 35 specifically on trauma, 30 on paediatric presentations, 13 on procedural skills, 10 on ethical and medicolegal issues, 7 on leading in emergency department, and 10 on research and patient quality/safety metrics. Successful competition allows the candidate to take the FRCEM OSCE within the next 7 years if not already taken, or together with it leads to completion and award of the Fellowship.

=== FRCEM OSCE ===
The FRCEM OSCE is also open to doctors who have a minimum of 1 year experience in higher specialty training (not including core training) and have completed the MRCEM (or the equivalent previous FRCEM Intermediate) within the past 7 years. It consists of 16 stations where they must demonstrate a clinical skill or interpret data related to "complex and challenging situations that are faced in Emergency Medicine practice". Successful competition allows the candidate to take the FRCEM SBA within the next 7 years if not already taken, or together with it leads to completion and award of the Fellowship.

== Fellowship ==
Those who pass the examination are admitted as Fellows by Examination of the Royal College of Emergency Medicine, and are entitled to use the postnominal FRCEM after their name. Fellowship may also be conferred by the college on those who have been recognised as making an exceptional contribution to the field of emergency medicine, known as Honorary Fellows, who may use the postnominal FRCEM (Hons). Fellowship of the college also includes a free subscription to the Emergency Medicine Journal, access to the RCEMLearning e-learning platform as well as the RCEM ePortfolio electronic portfolio platform, access to a health advice line, various discounts on goods and services, and opportunities for professional development or to apply for research grants.

== See also ==
- Fellowship of the Australasian College for Emergency Medicine (FACEM)
- European Board Examination in Emergency Medicine (EBEEM)
- Fellowship of the College of Emergency Medicine of the Colleges of Medicine of South Africa (FCEM (SA))
