= Gregory R. Ciottone =

American physician (born 1965)

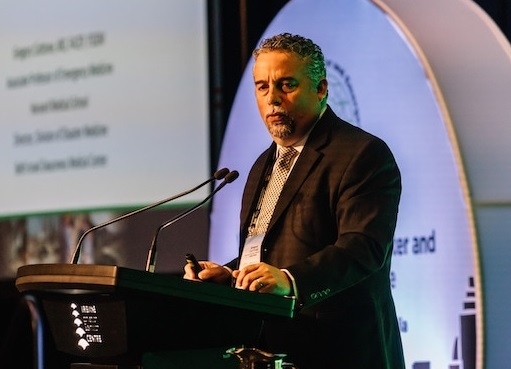
- Born: July 16, 1965 (age 61); Washington, DC
- Education: Colby College; University of Massachusetts Medical School
- Occupations: Emergency Physician and Professor
- Known for: Commander of one of the first federal disaster teams deployed to Ground Zero on 9/11/2001
- Notable work: Ciottone's Disaster Medicine, 3rd ed., Toxidrome Recognition in Chemical Weapons Attacks New England Journal of Medicine

Gregory R. Ciottone (born 1965) is an American physician specializing in disaster medicine and counter-terrorism medicine. He is a professor of clinical emergency medicine at Harvard Medical School and the founding director of the BIDMC Fellowship in Disaster Medicine, the first of its kind in a Harvard teaching hospital, now in its 20th year of operation. As well, he holds the position of Director of Medical Preparedness at the National Preparedness Leadership Initiative at Harvard University. He also served as a consultant to the White House Medical Unit for the Obama, Trump (1), and Biden administrations. In 2019 he was elected president of the World Association for Disaster and Emergency Medicine.

== Biography ==
Born in Washington, D.C., and residing in Westminster, Massachusetts, Ciottone attended St. Mark's School in Massachusetts for secondary school and went on to earn his B.A. in biology and chemistry in 1987 at Colby College. He then received his M.D. degree from the University of Massachusetts Medical School (UMMS) in 1991, receiving the Society of Academic Emergency Medicine Award for Excellence in Emergency Medicine. He completed his residency in Emergency Medicine at UMMS in 1994 and was selected as chief resident. He continued on at that institution, being appointed instructor of medicine in 1994, and later assistant professor of emergency medicine at UMMS, where he also served as director of the Institute for Disaster and Emergency Medicine, and then director of the Division of International Disaster and Emergency Medicine. In 1995 Ciottone was selected to lead the Washington DC–based American International Health Alliance (AIHA) Emergency Medicine Task Force for the former Soviet Union. He served as co-director of the EMS/Disaster Medicine Fellowship program at UMMS, and in 1998 was appointed a Disaster Medicine Fellowship Director for the International Atomic Energy Agency in Geneva Switzerland. In 1999 he was selected as Director of the University of Massachusetts-Minsk Belarus Medical Partnership program by AIHA.

In January 2001 Ciottone was appointed director of the Division of International Disaster and Emergency Medicine in the Department of Emergency Medicine at Beth Israel Deaconess Medical Center. He went on to become the chairman of the International Emergency Medicine Section, Division of Emergency Medicine at Harvard Medical School from 2002 to 2007, and was named chairman of the Disaster Medicine Section at HMS in 2007. Also in 2007, he founded the BIDMC Fellowship in Disaster Medicine. He rose to the level of Associate Professor of Emergency Medicine at Harvard Medical School in 2014, and to full Professor in 2025.

== Career ==
Ciottone's research and career interests have been in the area of Disaster Medicine.

He has been inducted as an honorary fellow into the Royal College of Surgeons in Ireland. He was also the 2018 recipient of the Disaster Medical Sciences award from the American College of Emergency Physicians. In 2020 he won the Distinguished Service Award from the American Academy of Disaster Medicine. In 2024 Ciottone was awarded Doctor Honoris Causa from the Université Toulouse III - Paul Sabatier in France for his work in Disaster Medicine.
