= The Remains of the Day (musical) =

- Music: Alex Loveless
- Lyrics: Alex Loveless
- Book: Alex Loveless; Chris Loveless
- Basis: "The Remains of the Day" by Kazuo Ishiguro
- Productions: 2010 London

The Remains of the Day is a musical written by Alex Loveless, based on the novel of the same name by Kazuo Ishiguro. The original production, directed by Chris Loveless, premiered at the Union Theatre in London, playing from August 31, 2010 to September 25, 2010.

== Background ==
In an interview, Ishiguro said, "It struck me as an intriguing idea. ... I am a big believer in musicals and I see no reason why my novel shouldn't make a good one. Stephen Sondheim's A Little Night Music shows you can set an unlikely story to music. ... This is a small scale thing and I might feel more cautious about it if the film version hadn't been such serious, faithful adaptation."

== Original London cast ==
- Reginald – Christopher Bartlett
- Sir David – Adrian Beaumont
- Stevens – Stephen Rashbrook
- Miss Kenton – Lucy Bradshaw
- Lord Darlington – Alan Vicary

== Reception ==
The musical received mixed reviews. Among the positive reviewers, Fiona Mountford wrote, "“Rashbrook gives a marvellously restrained performance that hints at the unexplored depths of Stevens’s soul, and he and Bradshaw, plus a top-notch ensemble, make easy work of the songs, many of which have a solemn and hymn-like feel. It’s not all gloom, though, with the frothy music hall number 'The End of the Pier' to lighten the mood. A canny West End producer could do far worse than to tweak this fine show for a transfer.” The What's On Stage review agreed, "The songs are almost always well-integrated, intelligently written, and subtly performed. Although Loveless’ adaptation does not quite pack what we feel is its potential punch, it does suggest a wealth of potential." BroadwayWorld's review by Carrie Dunn observed, "...some of this show works surprisingly well. This is pretty much entirely down to the touching, subtle performances of Stephen Rashbrook as butler Stevens and Lucy Bradshaw as housekeeper Miss Kenton. Both are compelling viewing, and work with the frequently limited (by necessity) material they have, endowing it with rich emotion."

Mixed to negative reviews included those in the Financial Times, TimeOut and MusicOMH.
