= The Remains of the Day =

1989 novel by Kazuo Ishiguro

- First edition
- Author: Kazuo Ishiguro
- Language: English
- Genre: Historical novel
- Publisher: Faber and Faber
- Publication date: May 1989
- Publication place: United Kingdom
- Media type: Print (hardback)
- Pages: 258
- ISBN: 978-0-571-15310-7
- OCLC: 59165609

The Remains of the Day is a 1989 novel by the Nobel Prize-winning British author Kazuo Ishiguro. The protagonist, Stevens, is a butler with a long record of service at Darlington Hall, a fictitious stately home near Oxford, England. In 1956, he takes a motoring holiday to visit a former colleague, and reminisces about events at Darlington Hall in the 1920s and 1930s.

The work won the Booker Prize for Fiction in 1989. A film adaptation of the novel, made in 1993 and starring Anthony Hopkins and Emma Thompson, was nominated for eight Academy Awards. In 2022, it was included on the "Big Jubilee Read" list of 70 books by Commonwealth authors, selected to celebrate the Platinum Jubilee of Elizabeth II.

== Plot ==
In 1956, Stevens, the narrator, is butler at Darlington Hall, a position he held for decades under the Hall's previous owner, Lord Darlington. After Darlington's death, the Hall was purchased by a wealthy American, Mr Farraday, who kept Stevens on, although with a much reduced staff. Stevens frets that he is unable to maintain professional standards, and when he receives a letter from a former colleague, the ex-housekeeper Mrs Benn (née Kenton), he detects hints that she has left her husband and that although many years have passed she might be interested in resuming her old position. Mr Farraday encourages Stevens to take a holiday, offering to lend him a car. Stevens accepts, and sets out for Cornwall where Mrs Benn now lives.

The novel intertwines the events of the next few days, as Stevens motors down to Cornwall, with memories of his professional life under Lord Darlington. He recalls his unswerving determination to meet his profession's highest standards of dignity, his unshakable loyalty, and his pride in having served an important gentleman doing great things in international affairs. He recalls early disagreements with Miss Kenton over professional procedures when she first joined the staff in 1922, followed by a growing respect over the subsequent years. He recalls Miss Kenton making occasional personal overtures, such as bringing flowers to brighten up his pantry, but reminds himself that he always remained professional, refusing to let such matters interfere with the dignity he considered his position required.

Stevens recollects that as an honest English gentleman Lord Darlington had felt it morally right after the war to bring Germany back into the 'civilised world', and that he had worked tirelessly to mitigate the worst effects of the Treaty of Versailles. The Hall became a regular meeting place for like-minded gentlemen of many nationalities. On one occasion, Stevens had facilitated an important secret meeting involving the Prime Minister and the German ambassador, Herr Ribbentrop. That evening, Miss Kenton had attempted to speak to Stevens concerning a proposal of marriage she had received, evidently expecting some personal response, but Stevens had brushed her off and remained focused on his duties. Miss Kenton had married Mr Benn and left Darlington Hall.

Stevens knows that Lord Darlington was an entirely honourable man who was most unfairly mischaracterised by the press. He was certainly never antisemitic, as alleged (though Stevens did, in fairness, have to admit to an early 'entirely insignificant' period when Darlington had instructed him to terminate the employment of two housemaids on the grounds that they were Jewish; Miss Kenton objected and threatened to hand in her notice, but in the event did not feel able to do so). He laments Darlington's mistake in suing a national newspaper after the war for portraying him as a Nazi sympathiser, the result of which was to destroy Darlington's reputation for good.

Stevens becomes increasingly uncertain as to whether he may have read too much into Mrs Benn's letter. And indeed, when they meet, she professes herself happy enough with the life she has made with her husband, particularly as she has a grandchild on the way. She does confess, though, to occasional periods when she considers what might have been, including the life she might have had with Stevens. He privately admits that his heart is breaking at this, but he says nothing other than to advise her to do all she can to make her retirement years happy for herself and her husband.

Stevens sits on a bench on the seafront where he falls into conversation with a stranger. Overcome, he says that although Lord Darlington ultimately proved misguided, at least he made his own mistakes. Stevens can find no professional dignity in having trusted him so totally that he cannot claim even that for himself. The stranger suggests that it is better to enjoy the present than to dwell on the past, as the evening is, after all, the best part of the day. Stevens appears to take this to heart as he focuses on the skills he intends to acquire to continue to provide the best possible service to Mr Farraday.

== Principal characters ==
- Stevens, the narrator, an English butler who serves at Darlington Hall. A man devoted to performing his job to the highest standards, and who is particularly concerned with the professional dignity of his position
- Miss Kenton, the housekeeper at Darlington Hall, later Mrs Benn. A capable and opinionated woman who works closely with Stevens as the two most senior serving staff.
- Lord Darlington, former owner of Darlington Hall.
- Mr Farraday, a wealthy American who purchases the Hall after Darlington's death.

== Release and publication history ==
The Remains of the Day was first published in the United Kingdom by Faber and Faber in May 1989, and in the United States by Alfred A. Knopf on 4 October 1989.

== Influence from Tom Waits ==
Kazuo Ishiguro recalled how Tom Waits influenced The Remains of the Day:

I thought I'd finished Remains, but then one evening heard Tom Waits singing his song "Ruby's Arms". It's a ballad about a soldier leaving his lover sleeping in the early hours to go away on a train. Nothing unusual in that. But the song is sung in the voice of a rough American hobo type utterly unaccustomed to wearing his emotions on his sleeve. And there comes a moment, when the singer declares his heart is breaking, that's almost unbearably moving because of the tension between the sentiment itself and the huge resistance that's obviously been overcome to utter it. Waits sings the line with cathartic magnificence, and you feel a lifetime of tough-guy stoicism crumbling in the face of overwhelming sadness. I heard this and reversed a decision I'd made, that Stevens would remain emotionally buttoned up right to the bitter end. I decided that at just one point – which I'd have to choose very carefully – his rigid defence would crack, and a hitherto concealed tragic romanticism would be glimpsed.

== Reception ==
The Remains of the Day is one of the most highly regarded post-war British novels. In 1989, the novel won the Booker Prize.

In 2006, The Observer asked 150 literary writers and critics to vote for the best British, Irish or Commonwealth novel from 1980 to 2005; The Remains of the Day placed joint-eighth. In 2007, The Remains of the Day was included in a Guardian list of "Books you can't live without" and also in a 2009 "1000 novels everyone must read" list. The Economist has described the novel as Ishiguro's "most famous book". On 5 November 2019, the BBC News listed The Remains of the Day on its list of the 100 most inspiring novels.

In a retrospective review published in The Guardian in 2012, Salman Rushdie argued that "the real story … is that of a man destroyed by the ideas upon which he has built his life". In Rushdie's view, Stevens's obsession with dignified restraint has cost him loving relationships with his father and with Miss Kenton.

Kathleen Wall argued that The Remains of the Day "may be seen to be about Stevens's attempts to grapple with his unreliable memories and interpretations and the havoc that his dishonesty has played on his life" [emphasis in original]. In particular, she suggested that The Remains of the Day challenges scholarly accounts of the unreliable narrator. Wall remarked that the ironic effect of Stevens's narration depends on the reader's assuming that he describes events reliably, while interpreting those events in self-serving or peculiar ways.

According to Steven Connor, The Remains of the Day thematises the idea of English national identity. In Stevens's view, the qualities of the best butlers, which involve restraining personal emotions in favour of keeping up appearances, are "identified as essentially English". Connor argued that early critics of The Remains of the Day, who saw it as a novel about Japanese national identity, were mistaken: "there seems to be no doubt that it is Englishness that is at stake or under analysis in this novel".

== Adaptations ==
- The novel was adapted into a 1993 film of the same name by Ruth Prawer Jhabvala. Directed and produced by Merchant Ivory Productions, the film starred Anthony Hopkins and Emma Thompson.
- A radio play adaptation in two-hour-long episodes starring Ian McDiarmid was first broadcast on BBC Radio 4 on 8 and 15 August 2003.
- A musical adaptation of the novel by Alex Loveless was staged in 2010 in London's Union Theatre, and received positive reviews.
- A manga adaptation illustrated by est em began serialization on Hayakawa Publishing's Hayacomic website on September 30, 2025.
- An abridged television adaptation, narrated by Steve Pemberton in the role of Stevens, was broadcast in 2024 as part of BBC Four's 'The Read' performance strand.

== Sources ==
- Connor, Steven (1996). The English Novel in History, 1950–1995. Routledge. doi:10.4324/9780203158135. ISBN 978-0-203-15813-5. OCLC 179111717.
- Wall, Kathleen (1994). "The Remains of the Day and Its Challenges to Theories of Unreliable Narration". The Journal of Narrative Technique. 24 (1): 18–42. ISSN 0022-2925. JSTOR 30225397. ProQuest 1291917995.
