= Moses McKenzie =

British writer

Moses McKenzie (born 1998) is a British writer. His debut novel An Olive Grove in Ends (2022) won the Hawthornden Prize and the Somerset Maugham Prize. This was followed by his second novel Fast by the Horns (2024).

== Early life and education ==
McKenzie spent his early childhood in Cornwall before moving to Bristol at age 7, where he grew up on Stapleton Road in Easton. He is of Jamaican descent. McKenzie attended St Mary Redcliffe and Temple School. He graduated with a Bachelor of Arts in English literature from the University of the West of England. McKenzie was raised a Baptist and converted to Islam.

== Bibliography ==
- An Olive Grove in Ends (2022)
- Fast by the Horns (2024)
- Untitled third novel (TBA)

== Accolades ==
Year	Award	Category	Title	Result	Ref
2022	Soho House Awards	Breakthrough Writer		Won	
2023	Somerset Maugham Award		An Olive Grove in Ends	Won	
2023	Hawthornden Prize		An Olive Grove in Ends	Won	
2025	The Sunday Times Young Writer Award		Fast by the Horns	Shortlisted	
