= Green Shield Canada =

Health insurance company of Canada

Green Shield Canada (GSC)
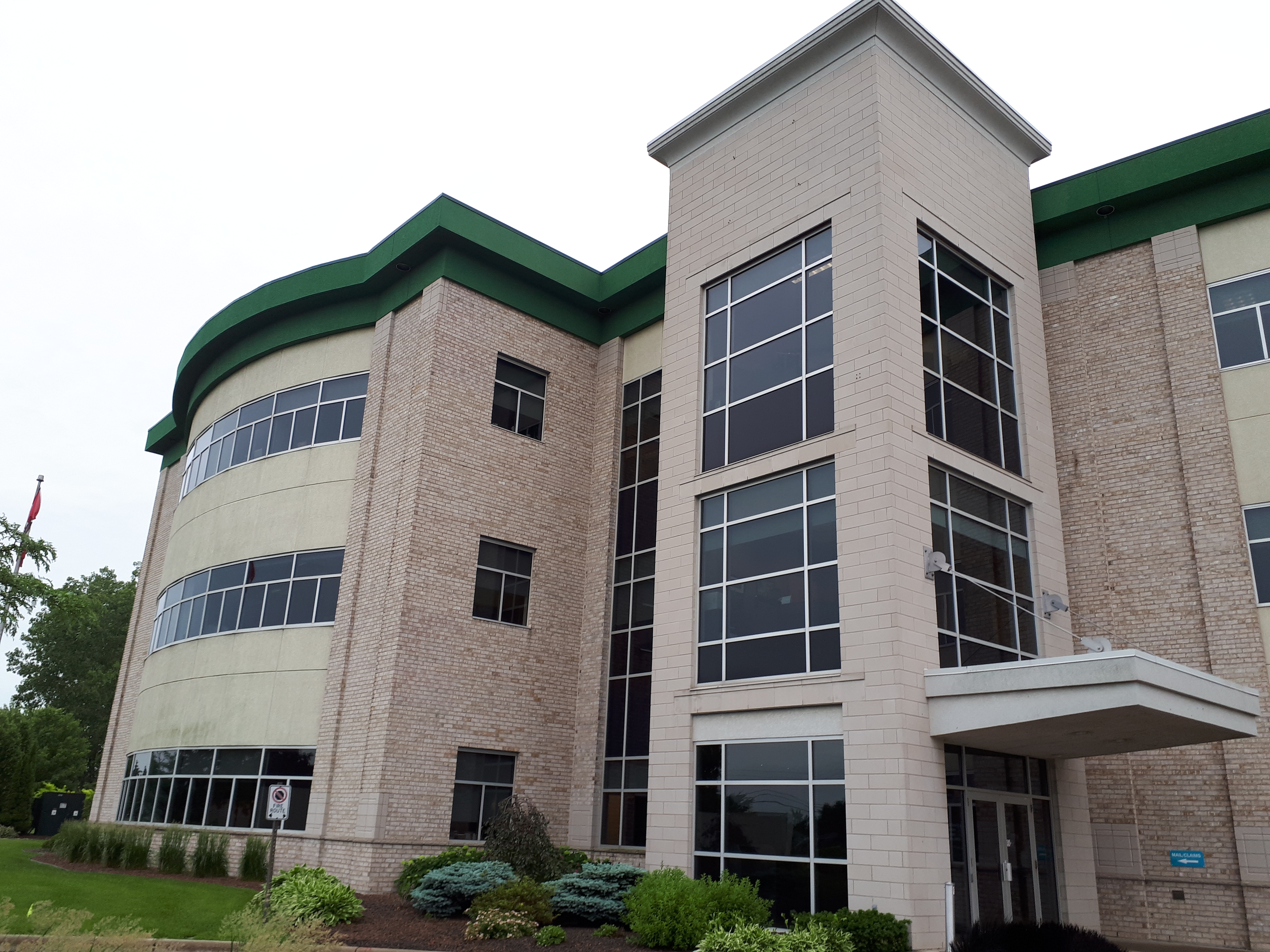
- GSC head office in Windsor.
- Type: Non-for-profit
- Industry: Health and dental benefits insurance
- Founded: 1957
- Headquarters: 8677 Anchor Drive; Windsor, Ontario; N9A 6W1
- Website: greenshield.ca

Green Shield Canada (GSC) is a not-for-profit benefits carrier that provides drug, dental, extended health care, vision, hospital and travel benefits for groups and individuals, as well as administration services. GSC is incorporated under a Federal Act of Parliament and regulated by the Office of the Superintendent of Financial Institutions (OSFI).

== History ==
GSC's was founded in 1957 in Windsor, Ontario. The founder, pharmacist Bill Wilkinson, and four other pharmacists created Canada's first pre-paid drug plan, and started the company as Prescription Services Inc. GSC policies focus on prioritizing evidence-based treatments, preventive care and claims management strategies. These policies also help to prevent fraud and ensure that provincial coverage pays when possible, while prior authorization may be required for certain treatments. The policies can save money for plan sponsors, but sometimes lead to more paperwork for plan members. GSC has been in the news for working with clients that have dealt with high-profile benefits fraud cases using other insurers.

== Headquarters ==
GSC's head office is located on Anchor Drive in Windsor, Ontario. GSC has regional offices in Vancouver, Calgary, London, Toronto, Montreal and Quebec City.

== Community initiatives ==
As a not-for-profit, GSC either reinvests profits into the business, or into community health care initiatives across Canada. GSC has supported a variety of causes linked to wellness, including homelessness, food insecurity, dentistry, sex trafficking, emergency service access, education, mobile outreach vehicles, disaster relief, research and healthcare clinics

Green Shield has also participated in clinical trials designed to encourage physical activity and smoking cessation programs.
