= Katherine Henderson (physician) =

British medical doctor

- Education: Robinson College, Cambridge
- Medical career
- Institutions: Barts and The London School of Medicine and Dentistry; Guy's and St Thomas' NHS Foundation Trust; Homerton University Hospital
- Sub-specialties: Emergency medicine

Katherine Henderson is a British medical doctor who is a consultant in Emergency Medicine at Guy's and St Thomas' NHS Foundation Trust. She is a former President of the Royal College of Emergency Medicine.

== Early life and education ==
Henderson completed her medical degree at Robinson College, Cambridge. She moved to Barts and The London School of Medicine and Dentistry for her specialty training, where she worked in clinical medicine.

== Research and career ==
Henderson started her career at the Homerton University Hospital. In 2006, she joined Guy's and St Thomas' NHS Foundation Trust. She was appointed Clinical Lead in 2012.

In 2019, Henderson was the first woman elected President of the Royal College of Emergency Medicine. She planned to use her presidency to make emergency medicine a sustainable career, and ensure that no patients had to experience long wait times. Her presidency coincided with the COVID-19 pandemic, and Henderson had to switch her focus to the ongoing crisis. She was appointed a Member of the Order of the British Empire for services to the National Health Service in the 2021 Birthday Honours. Later that year, Henderson highlighted the experience that healthcare workers were facing during the pandemic. She explained that staff had been violently threatened, and that some senior nurses wore body cameras to record incidents.
