= African Federation for Emergency Medicine =

International medical organization of Africa

- Abbreviation: AFEM
- Headquarters: Cape Town, South Africa
- Region served: Africa
- Fields: Emergency Medicine
- Key people: Joe Bonney (President); Lauren Lai King (COO); Shaheem de Vries (CEO)
- Website: https://afem.africa

The African Federation for Emergency Medicine is an international consortium of Africa-focused emergency medicine organizations.

== Background ==
AFEM was founded in 2008 as a society of emergency medical societies, but now focuses on the development and advancement of emergency medicine across Africa.

As an advocacy group, AFEM is also concerned with the development of pre-hospital and in-hospital emergency medical systems and has encouraged their development across the continent. It is composed of eight national societies, twelve affiliate organizations, and more than 2,000 members from 40 different countries.

== Research ==
AFEM aims to strengthen emergency care in Africa by leading collaborations and prioritizing health advocacy. By using strategic research agendas, AFEM has provided guidance for education and training, and facilitated the development of sustainable policies and frameworks to strengthen emergency care. One author has said, "[AFEM] has produced the most concrete solutions responsive to the action items laid out in [World Health Assembly] 60.22. AFEM’s first consensus conference, held in November 2011, laid the foundation in nursing care, specialist training, facility-based emergency care, out of hospital care and advocacy issues particular to the continent."

== Peer-reviewed journal ==
The African Journal of Emergency Medicine (AfJEM) is the official journal of the African Federation for Emergency Medicine. It is a peer-reviewed journal that publishes original research, reviews, brief reports, case reports, and commentary on topics related to scientific, ethical, social, and economic importance to emergency care in Africa.

== COVID-19 ==
During the COVID-19 pandemic the federation promoted Surgisphere's COVID-19 Severity Scoring Tool for use in 26 African countries. Several institutions started validation studies of the application. On 5 June 2020, in response to a scandal uncovering academic misconduct by Surgisphere, the federation recommended that use of the severity scoring tool be ceased.

== Affiliate organizations ==
- Association de Medecine d’Urgence du Congo Kinshasa (AMUCK)
- ATA International
- Destination Medicine
- Egyptian Resuscitation Council
- Emergency Care Society of South Africa
- Forum for Associate Specialist and Staff Grade Doctors in Emergency Medicine
- Heal Africa
- Medline Angola
- RapidDeploy
- Sidharte
- Uganda Ambulance Service
- Yaounde Emergency Centre

== National Societies ==
- Association de Médecine d’Urgence de la République Démocratique du Congo (AMURDC)
- Egyptian Society for Emergency Medicine (EgSEM)
- Ethiopian Society for Emergency Professionals (ESEP)
- Society of Emergency Medicine Practitioners of Nigeria (SEMPON)
- Libyan Emergency Medicine Association (LEMA)
- Emergency Medicine Society of South Africa (EMSSA)
- Sudanese Emergency Physicians Association (SEPA)
- Rwanda Emergency Care Association (RECA)
- Emergency Medicine Association of Tanzania (EMAT)
- Zimbabwe Emergency Medicine Society (ZEMS)
- Emergency Medicine Society of Ghana (EMSOG)
