= International Federation for Emergency Medicine =

Organisation promoting international emergency medicine

- Abbreviation: IFEM
- Formation: 1991
- Type: INGO
- Legal status: Company limited by guarantee
- Location: West Melbourne, Victoria, Australia
- Region served: Worldwide
- Members: 70
- Official language: English
- President: Dr Ffion Davies
- Website: http://www.ifem.cc

The International Federation for Emergency Medicine (IFEM) is an organisation promoting international emergency medicine around the world. It is a consortium of over 70 national and regional emergency medicine organisations. IFEM organises the International Conference on Emergency Medicine (ICEM).

== International emergency medicine ==
International emergency medicine has been defined as "the area of emergency medicine concerned with the development of emergency medicine in other countries." In that definition, "other countries" refers to nations that do not have a mature emergency care system (exemplified by board certified emergency physicians and academic emergency medicine, among other things). Included in those nations are some that are otherwise quite developed but lack a complete emergency medical system, such as Armenia, China, Israel, Nicaragua, and the Philippines. Work in international emergency medicine can be broken down into two main categories: 1) the promotion of emergency medicine as a recognized and established specialty in other countries, and 2) The provision of humanitarian assistance.

However, William Burdick, Mark Hauswald, and Kenneth Iserson have criticized the above definition for being an oxymoron, given the international nature of medicine and the number of physicians working internationally. From their point of view, international emergency medicine is not solely about development of emergency medical systems but is instead better described as the training required for, as well as the reality of, practicing the specialty abroad from one's native country.

== History ==
The precursor to the International Foundation for Emergency Medicine (IFEM) was the International Conference on Emergency Medicine (ICEM), which was first held in 1986 in London. The idea of having such a conference had been first suggested by William Rutherford and Gautam Bodiwala at the Scientific Assembly of the American College of Emergency Physicians (ACEP) in 1984. The only four organizations present at this first conference were ACEP, the British Association for Emergency Medicine (BAEM), the Canadian Association of Emergency Physicians (CAEP), and the Australasian College for Emergency Medicine (ACEM). In 1988, at the second ICEM in Brisbane, Australia, the idea of creating an international emergency medicine organization was first proposed. The following year, the four organizations agreed to form IFEM, although their presidents did not sign the charter until 1991. Its initial purpose was to assist them in running ICEM, which was important because it allowed "the founding nations to share experiences, network, develop collaborations and assist trainees and specialists to rotate between countries and learn new approaches to old problems."

In 1998, IFEM opened up membership to other national emergency medicine organizations. Since then, membership has grown rapidly, with 15 additional national emergency medicine organizations joining by 2003, bringing the total number of members to 19. By 2010, IFEM had more than 40 members. As of 2013, IFEM represents over 60 national emergency medicine organizations.

== Organization ==
=== Types of members ===
IFEM has three levels of membership: full members, affiliate members, and ex officio members.

A full member is defined as "the leading national emergency medicine organization for physicians in a country in which emergency medicine is officially recognized as a medical specialty and where there also exists at least one recognized training program in emergency medicine." They may appoint one representative to the IFEM Board; this representative has one vote. Full members can apply to host ICEM. As of 2013, there are 34 full members.

An affiliate member is defined as "any national emergency medicine organization for physicians practicing emergency medicine in a country where the specialty of emergency medicine is not yet officially recognized or residency equivalent training programs in emergency medicine do not yet exist." They may also be any additional national emergency medicine organization for physicians practicing emergency medicine from a country already represented by a full or founding member. Affiliate members may appoint one non-voting member to the IFEM Board. Like full members, they can apply to host ICEM." As of 2013, there are 14 affiliate members.

An ex officio member is defined as a multinational emergency medicine organisation. They may appoint one non-voting member to the IFEM Board. As of 2013, there are 5 ex officio members.

Types of Membership
Membership Type	Representative	Voting Rights	Can apply to hold ICEM	Fee*
Full	Yes	Yes	Yes	Yes
Affiliate	Yes	No	Yes	Yes
Ex officio	Yes	No	No	No

^{*}An organization from a country with a per capita GNI below a certain threshold will have its annual subscription waived.

=== Governing structure ===
IFEM was incorporated as a public company limited by guarantee in Australia in 2010. As of 2013, it has three components to its governing structure: a board, an executive, and an assembly.

Until 2011, the IFEM Board was composed of a representative from each member country, with full members having one voting representative and affiliate and ex officio members having one non-voting representative. By that point, IFEM has over 50 full, affiliate, and ex officio members, resulting in a board whose size was unwieldy. It was then agreed that a new board of 12 members would be established in 2012. Six of these members consist of office-bearers from the IFEM Executive, with the other six being representatives from six geographic regions: Africa, Australasia, Europe, North America, and South America.

The IFEM Executive was established in 2006 to improve responsiveness. It consists of six office-bearers: a president, vice-president, president-elect, secretary, treasurer, and member-at-large. As of 2013, the president is Peter Cameron, the vice-president is James Ducharme, the president-elect is C. James Holliman, the secretary is Robert Schafermeyer, the treasurer is Andrew Singer, and the member-at-large is Hiu-fai Ho.

To replace the former Board, which previously represented all members, the IFEM Assembly was created.

=== Committees and special interest groups ===
The IFEM Board can establish committees to perform focused work on behalf of IFEM. Committees established by the board include a finance committee, a core curriculum and education committee, nominations committee, specialty implementation committee, governance committee, clinical practice committee, and research committee. Membership on a committee is open to anyone who is part of an IFEM member society or college.

IFEM has four special interest groups: pediatric emergency medicine, triage, ultrasound, and disaster medicine. Each group reports to the clinical practice committee. Unlike committees, "other interested individuals" who are not part of an IFEM member society or college may join special interest groups.

== Other initiatives ==
=== Awards ===
IFEM offers two main awards: Order of the IFEM and IFEM Humanitarian Award. The Order of the IFEM (FIFEM) was established in 1999 "to recognise those individuals who have contributed significantly to the development of emergency medicine in their country and to the development of the International Federation for Emergency Medicine." More than 70 Fellows of the IFEM have been inducted since 2000, when it was first awarded at the 8th ICEM; new fellows are inducted biennially at the ICEM. The IFEM Humanitarian Award was established in 2000 and is given to either an individual physician or an organization whose work "has a major humanitarian or public health benefit." It was first inaugurated in 2004 at the 10th ICEM, and on the first 11 occasions it was given twice to organizations and nine times to individuals.

=== Curriculum ===
One of the goals of IFEM is to equip nations to develop emergency medical systems, and one key component of doing so is to identify the aspects of training that are essential for health care providers. Although countries have very different needs and resources, a standard curriculum is still useful for identifying core issues. Thus, IFEM developed a model curriculum in 2009. This initiative seeks to provide a minimum basic standard that can be tailored to the specific needs of the various nations implementing training in emergency medicine. It is targeted towards all medical students in order to produce a minimum competency in emergency care for all physicians, regardless of their specialty.

== Influence ==
Emergency Medicine Journal calls ICEM a major international emergency medicine conference, while Kumar Alagappan and C. James Holliman refer to IFEM as "probably the most active, broad-based, international organization dealing with international EM [emergency medicine] development issues." The IFEM has played a part in helping to increase global acceptance of the specialty of emergency medicine.

Additionally, IFEM serves as the "umbrella group" for all of the national and regional societies representing international emergency medicine. It has also been described as "the peak EM [emergency medicine] in the world".

== National membership of IFEM ==
Current Members of the International Federation for Emergency Medicine
Organization/Country	Year Joined
ACEP (United States)	1989
RCEM (United Kingdom) (Note: As the British Association of Accident and Emergency Medicine (BAEM))	1989
CAEP (Canada)	1989
ACEM (Australia and New Zealand)	1989
Hong Kong	1998
Mexico	1999
China	1999
South Korea	2000
Czech Republic	2000
Taiwan	2000
Singapore	2000
Israel	2000
Turkey	2002
Poland	2002
The Netherlands	2002
South Africa	2002
Spain	2002
Ireland	2002
Argentina	2003
Costa Rica	2012
