= Condom-associated erection problem =

Erectile dysfunction experienced due to condoms

Condom-associated erection problem (CAEP) is erectile dysfunction experienced due to condoms. CAEP can occur in young and healthy men who otherwise have no erectile dysfunctions, although men who experience CAEP have greater odds of having mild-to-moderate erectile dysfunction. CAEP has the effect of discouraging condom use by both males and females. One possible way to reduce CAEP is to encourage men with CAEP to try a variety of sizes, shapes, and textures of condoms to find the most comfortable ones.
