= Lucy Bradshaw (actress) =

British actress and singer

- Born: Lucy-Anne Bradshaw; Bristol, United Kingdom
- Occupation: Actress
- Years active: 1994–2002; 2008–Present
- Website: http://www.lucy-bradshaw.co.uk

Lucy-Anne Bradshaw is a British actress and singer, known for playing Cathy in the original production of Whistle Down the Wind by National Youth Music Theatre and Miss Kenton in the musical adaptation of The Remains of the Day. She also played Terry in Merrily We Roll Along directed by Michael Grandage at the Donmar Warehouse in December 2000, which won the 2001 Laurence Olivier Award for Best New Musical.

== Background ==
Lucy-Anne Bradshaw was born in Bristol. She attended St Mary Redcliffe and Temple School played many leading roles with the National Youth Music Theatre and won the Cameron Mackintosh Award in 1997. Lucy trained at Webber Douglas Academy of Dramatic Art.

== Career ==
Lucy began her career creating/playing roles such as Cathy in the Original musical play Whistle Down the Wind for National Youth Music Theatre in Richard Taylor and Russell Labey's musical adaption. She went on to play a role in Merrily We Roll Along at the Donmar Warehouse directed by Michael Grandage and played the part of Gertrude Lawrence in Noel and Gertie at The Salisbury Playhouse. Bradshaw played the part of Miss Kenton in The Remains of the Day, the musical adaption of the Booker Prize winning novel by Kazuo Ishiguro.

== Theatre ==
Year	Title	Role	Director	Theatre
1994	Whistle Down the Wind	Cathy	Russell Labey	National Youth Music Theatre.
1996	The Beggars Opera	Lucy Lockit	Frank Whately	National Youth Music Theatre.
1999	The Lady of Cammelias	Marguerite	Tom Hunsinger	Chanticleer Theatre.
2000	New Boy	Louise	Russell Labey	Pleasance Theatre Edinburgh.
2001	Merrily We Roll Along	Movie Star	Michael Grandage	Donmar Warehouse.
2002	Noel & Gertie	Gertrude Lawrence	Douglas Rintoul	Salisbury Playhouse.
2010	The Remains of the Day	Miss. Kenton	Chris Loveless	Union Theatre.
2010	Sondheim at 80	Movie Star	Concert Performance with Jamie Lloyd	Queen's Theatre.
