= International Council for Educational Media =

The International Council for Educational Media (ICEM) is a non-profit, non-governmental organisation formed with the intent of promoting and developing educational media and its use in a variety of pedagogical fields.

== History ==
ICEM was founded in 1950. The preliminary name of the organisation was ICEF ("Film") and as the founders foresaw the development of the field they altered the name to International Council for Educational Media. The headquarters of the organisation is in Vienna, Austria. ICEM is currently active in over 30 countries and has maintained operational relations from the beginning with UNESCO, AECT, CARDET and other international organisations.

Educational Media International, is ICEM's refereed academic journal published by Routledge (Taylor & Francis) and issued quarterly. It is covered by the British Education Index, Educational Research Abstracts online (ERA), Research into higher Education Abstracts, ERIC, EBSCO host and ProQuest Information and Learning.
