= Canadian Association of Emergency Physicians =

- Abbreviation: CAEP
- Region served: Canada

Canadian Journal of Emergency Medicine
- Discipline: Emergency medicine
- Language: English
- Edited by: Ian G Stiell

Publication details
- History: 1999–present
- Publisher: Cambridge University Press

Standard abbreviations
- ISO 4: Can. J. Emerg. Med.

Indexing
- ISSN: 1481-8035
- OCLC no.: 43829472

Links
- Journal homepage; Online access

The Canadian Association of Emergency Physicians (CAEP) is the professional association of emergency physicians in Canada. It is also known in French as Association Canadienne des Médecins d'Urgence (ACMU). The official journal of the CAEP is the Canadian Journal of Emergency Medicine.

The CAEP helped found the International Federation for Emergency Medicine in 1991 along with the American College of Emergency Physicians (ACEP), the Australasian College for Emergency Medicine (ACEM), and the (then) British Association for Emergency Medicine (BAEM).

== Partners ==
=== Non-profits ===
CAEP is partnered with several Canadian non-profit organizations and professional societies including the Canadian Association of Physician Assistants, Canadian Blood Services, GBS/CIDP Foundation of Canada, and the Society of Rural Physicians of Canada.

=== Governments and public health ===
CAEP's government and public health partners include Eastern Health, Fraser Health, the Government of Nunavut, Government of Prince Edward Island, Health Canada, Northern Health, Nova Scotia Health Authority, and the Province of New Brunswick.

=== Corporate ===
CAEP's corporate partners include AbbVie, Actelion, Bristol Myers Squibb, Fujifilm, General Electric, GE Healthcare, Green Shield Canada, Laerdal Medical, Mindray, Pfizer, Purdue Pharma, Rogers Wireless, Servier, Siemens Healthineers, SonoSim, Takeda Pharmaceutical Company, and Telus.
