= Clifford Mann =

British Emergency Medicine physician (1962–2021)

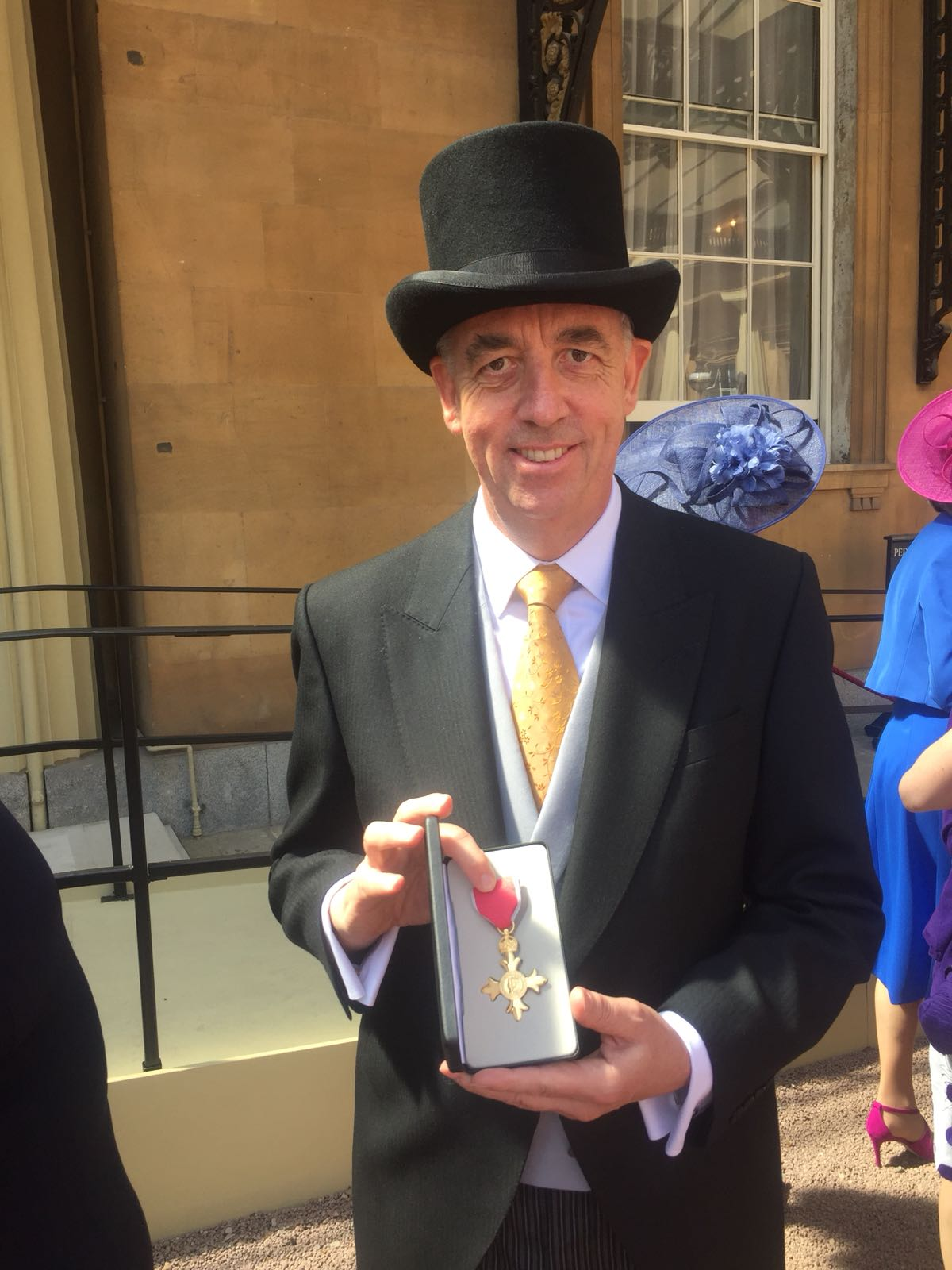
- Born: 22 June 1962
- Died: 20 February 2021 (aged 58)
- Occupation: Emergency Medicine physician

Clifford John Mann OBE (22 June 1962 – 20 February 2021) was a British Emergency Medicine physician, and President of the Royal College of Emergency Medicine 2013–2016, becoming the first President of Royal College of Emergency Medicine when the organisation received its royal charter.

== Career ==
Mann graduated from the Charing Cross and Westminster Medical School in London in 1986. He took up a consultant position the Musgrove Park Hospital, Taunton, Somerset.

Mann was registrar of the College of Emergency Medicine 2010–2013, then became president in 2013. In March 2015, the college was granted the use of the word Royal in its title. Mann had been an outspoken critic of some government policies.

In 2017 he was appointed joint lead of the Getting It Right First Time programme for Emergency Medicine 2017, a set of aligned initiatives to improve standards of care across England. In 2016 he became a NHS National Clinical Director for Urgent and Emergency Care.

In 2017 and in 2020, the Health Service Journal included Mann in their lists of the most influential people in Health.

== Personal life ==
Mann had an oesophageal cancer diagnosis and died age 58 at his home in Somerset on 20 February 2021. Tributes were paid to Mann by NHS England's Chief Executive Simon Stevens.

== Honours ==
Mann was made an Officer of the Order of the British Empire (OBE) in the 2018 New Year Honours list for services to emergency medicine.
