= Emergency Medicine Journal =

- Discipline: Emergency medicine
- Language: English
- Edited by: Rick Body

Publication details
- Former names: Archives of Emergency Medicine, Journal of Accident and Emergency Medicine
- History: 1983–present
- Publisher: BMJ Group on behalf of the Royal College of Emergency Medicine (United Kingdom)
- Frequency: Monthly
- Open access: Hybrid
- Impact factor: 2.8 (2025)

Standard abbreviations
- ISO 4: Emerg. Med. J.

Indexing
- ISSN: 1472-0205 (print); 1472-0213 (web)
- OCLC no.: 801060983

Links
- Journal homepage; Online access; Online archive

The Emergency Medicine Journal is a monthly peer-reviewed medical journal that is published by the BMJ Group on behalf of the Royal College of Emergency Medicine of which it is an official journal It is also an official journal of the British Association for Immediate Care and the Faculty of Pre-Hospital Care of the Royal College of Surgeons of Edinburgh. The journal covers developments in the field of emergency and critical care medicine in both the hospital and pre-hospital environments.

The journal was established in March 1984 as the Archives of Emergency Medicine and was renamed Journal of Accident and Emergency Medicine in 1994, before receiving its current title in March 2000.

According to the Journal Citation Reports, the journal has a 2023 impact factor of 2.8.
