= Royal College of Emergency Medicine =

Emergency medicine professional association

- Arms of the College
- Formation: Association: 12 October 1967; 58 years ago Faculty: 2 November 1993; 32 years ago College: 29 February 2008; 18 years ago
- Merger of: British Association for Emergency Medicine, Faculty of Accident and Emergency Medicine
- Type: Medical royal college
- Headquarters: 54 Ayres Street, London, England
- Region served: United Kingdom
- President: Ian Higginson
- Publication: Emergency Medicine Journal
- Affiliations: Academy of Medical Royal Colleges; International Federation for Emergency Medicine
- Website: www.rcem.ac.uk

The Royal College of Emergency Medicine (RCEM) is an independent professional association of emergency physicians in the United Kingdom which sets standards of training and administers examinations for emergency medicine. The patron is the Princess Royal.

== History ==
The College in its current form was incorporated by royal charter in 2008. However, the history of its preceding organisations, the Faculty of Accident and Emergency Medicine and the British Association for Emergency Medicine, date back to 1993 and 1967 respectively.

=== 1st association in the UK ===
Traditionally in British hospital practice, "casualty departments" were staffed and led mainly by non-consultant doctors with surgical backgrounds. The first UK doctor to be designated as a "Consultant Surgeon in Charge of the Casualty Department and Receiving Room" was Maurice Ellis, who was appointed at Leeds General Infirmary in 1952. Another 15 years passed before a distinct professional body came into being; Ellis became the head of the Casualty Surgeons Association (CSA) which first met on 12 October 1967 at BMA House (a year before the equivalent American College of Emergency Physicians in the United States). The field developed over the years, with the first UK specialty exam in emergency medicine held in 1983 under the auspices of the CSA. The CSA adopted the British Accident & Emergency Medicine Journal and Archives of Emergency Medicine as its journals in 1985. The CSA changed its name to the British Association for Accident and Emergency Medicine (BAEM) in 1990. It helped found the International Federation for Emergency Medicine in 1991 along with the American, Canadian and Australasian colleges. The BAEM was renamed once more in 2004 to the British Association for Emergency Medicine, retaining the same initials.

=== Intercollegiate faculty ===
The intercollegiate Faculty of Accident and Emergency Medicine (FAEM) was inaugurated on 2 November 1993 with six parent colleges: the Royal College of Surgeons, the Royal College of Physicians, the Royal College of Physicians of Edinburgh, Royal College of Surgeons of Edinburgh, the Royal College of Physicians and Surgeons of Glasgow, and the Royal College of Anaesthetists. It was tasked with developing academic and training issues, whilst the BAEM had responsibility for professional and clinical matters.

=== Merger ===
In late 2005, FAEM reached agreement with BAEM for the two organizations to merge to form a new medical royal college. The faculty was renamed the College of Emergency Medicine (CEM) as of 1 January 2006, becoming independent of its parent colleges. It relocated to Churchill House in London (the headquarters of the Royal College of Anaesthetists, where BAEM was also based) on 29 August 2006. CEM and BAEM formally merged in February 2008, with the new organisation continuing under the name of "College of Emergency Medicine", but incorporated by a royal charter giving it its own legal status. In February 2012 the College moved to newly purchased headquarters at 7-9 Bream's Buildings in London.

Dr Clifford Mann was president of the College 2013–2016, and was an outspoken critic of the Coalition government's Health and Social Care Act 2012 which he blamed both for causing "decision-making paralysis" and leaving the country short of around 375 emergency doctors.

=== Royal College ===
The college was granted permission to use the "Royal" title in January 2015, giving rise to its current name.

In July 2017 the college produced a report saying that the NHS needed at least 5,000 more beds to achieve safe bed occupancy levels and hit the four-hour target in emergency departments.

== Role of the College ==
The College sets standards of training and administers examinations for emergency physicians. It also organises annual scientific meetings, as well as continuing professional development meetings for its members.

In November 2021 it produced a report showing that pressures from the COVID-19 pandemic in the United Kingdom had produced more than 4,500 excess deaths in 2020-21 as a result of crowding or 12-hour stays in emergency departments.

== Examinations ==
The College sets the qualification awarded by examination that lead to a Certificate of Completion of Training in emergency medicine training in the United Kingdom - the Fellowship of the Royal College of Emergency Medicine (FRCEM). Doctors who complete this training program may sit the FCEM examination, and on completion become a Fellow of the College and may be recommended by the College for a Certificate of Completion of Training in emergency medicine.

=== History of the examinations ===
The first sitting of the College's examination was the Fellowship of the Faculty of Accident and Emergency Medicine (FFAEM) examination, equivalent to the current Final FRCEM, was in October 1996. In 2003 the College introduced an introductory examination, now the preferred route of entry to specialist registrar training, the Membership of the Faculty of A&E Medicine (MFAEM).

Both examinations were renamed in 2006, as part of the creation of the College, as Fellowship of the College of Emergency Medicine (FCEM) and Membership of the College of Emergency Medicine (MCEM) respectively. Their titles were further updated in 2015 when the college gained the "Royal" title, as the Membership of the Royal College of Emergency Medicine (MRCEM), and the higher Fellowship of the Royal College of Emergency Medicine (FRCEM).

In August 2016 further changes to the curriculum led to the merging of the examinations into a new FRCEM exam, split into three parts: the FRCEM Primary Examination, FRCEM Intermediate Certificate, and the FRCEM Final Examination.

Further revisions in July 2021 saw the exams being separated out again; the FRCEM Primary and FRCEM Intermediate qualifications were depreciated and replaced with the MRCEM primary and MRCEM intermediate SBA examinations (which in the interim had continued as a qualification for doctors not in formal training programmes).

== See also ==
- Emergency Medicine Journal
- Katherine Henderson (physician)
- Clifford Mann
- Adrian Boyle (physician)
