= World Association for Disaster and Emergency Medicine =

- Abbreviation: WADEM
- Formation: October 2, 1976
- Type: INGO
- Legal status: association
- Purpose: medical/humanitarian
- Location: Madison, Wisconsin
- Coordinates: 43°04′33″N 89°26′43″W
- Region served: worldwide
- Members: Multidisciplinary
- Official language: English
- President: Donald A. Donahue|Prof. Donald A. Donahue, DHEd, MBA, MSJ, FACHE, FRSPH, FIBODM
- Website: http://www.wadem.org
- Formerly called: Club of Mainz

The World Association for Disaster and Emergency Medicine (WADEM) is an international organization concerned with disaster medicine. Originally named the Club of Mainz, it was founded on October 2, 1976. It has hosted the World Congress on Disaster and Emergency Medicine every two years since 1979. Additionally, it publishes the peer-reviewed journal Prehospital and Disaster Medicine.

The UN describes WADEM as "an international association of the world’s disaster and emergency health experts", while Impact says that WADEM has a commitment "to advance the frontier of disaster and emergency research" by focusing on "the scientific investigation of...emergency response."

== Disaster Medicine ==
WADEM defines a medical disaster as "a local event where the casualties overwhelm the locally available medical resources," a definition that is much broader than the popular image of a disaster involving large numbers of injuries and deaths.

== History ==
According to Peter Safar, the idea for what was to become the Club of Mainz and eventually WADEM was first proposed by Rudolf Frey in 1973 at an international symposium on emergency medical services in Mainz, West Germany. Steven Rottman's account of the 1973 meeting is slightly different in that he describes it as discussion between physicians concerned by "the disparity between the potentials of modern resuscitation and its unavailability for most everyday emergencies". Frey's vision was for leaders in emergency medical care from all continents to try to improve emergency and disaster medicine. In doing so, Frey wanted to emulate the approach used by the Club of Rome; that is, he wanted influential members of the health professions to use research data "to convince persons with power about the need for change".

To this end, Frey invited 10 "enthusiasts of acute medicine" to Geneva, Switzerland, in September 1976. These ten authorities from seven different countries aimed to improve "the delivery of resuscitative care in daily life and for acute medical care following disasters". There they met with international agencies concerned with disaster medicine. Afterward, they went to Mainz, where they developed the organization's objectives and bylaws.

WADEM was founded on October 2, 1976, as the Club of Mainz, "with the goal of improving the worldwide delivery of pre hospital and emergency care during everyday and mass emergency disasters". Peter Safar and Rudolf Frey were among its cofounders, with Frey being the first president. Since 1987, it has held a biennial conference on disaster medicine in a number of places around the world.

At the 2005 World Congress, the first subspecialty group for nurses was formed.

== Prehospital and Disaster Medicine ==
Prehospital and Disaster Medicine is WADEM's official journal. According to Cambridge University Press, it is one of the leading scientific journals focused on prehospital, emergency, and disaster health. It is published bi-monthly in over 55 countries and is the only peer-reviewed international journal in its field. By September 2006, the journal was also available online.

According to Eldis, it is concerned with "the practice of out-of-hospital and in-hospital emergency medical care, disaster medicine, and public health and safety".

The two main goals of Prehospital and Disaster Medicine are to aid

1) the improvement of the types and quality of the care delivered to patients with perceived medical emergencies and to victims of multicasualty accidents or disasters, including the public health and safety aspects of such events; and
2) the prevention and/or mitigation of the occurrence of such events and of the effects of these events upon the human population and environment."

== World Congress on Disaster and Emergency Medicine ==
The World Congress on Disaster and Emergency Medicine is held every two years, preferably in a different region of the world each time. Its size can be seen in the fact that roughly 1,600 delegates attended the 17th Congress in Beijing, China. This was also the first conference at which veterinarians presented on various topics.

The purpose of the Congress is for "members and interested participants [to] present scientific reports on emergency and resuscitation research, individual responses to major disasters, and changes in systems of providing prehospital care."

List of World Congresses on Disaster and Emergency Medicine
| Number | Year | Location |
|---|---|---|
| 1st | 1979 | Mainz |
| 2nd | 1981 | Pittsburgh |
| 3rd | 1983 | Rome |
| 4th | 1985 | Brighton |
| 5th | 1987 | Rio de Janeiro |
| 6th | 1989 | Hong Kong |
| 7th | 1991 | Montreal |
| 8th | 1993 | Stockholm |
| 9th | 1995 | Jerusalem |
| 10th | 1997 | Mainz |
| 11th | 1999 | Osaka |
| 12th | 2001 | Lyon |
| 13th | 2003 | Melbourne |
| 14th | 2005 | Edinburgh |
| 15th | 2007 | Amsterdam |
| 16th | 2009 | Victoria |
| 17th | 2011 | Beijing |
| 18th | 2013 | Manchester |
| 19th | 2015 | Cape Town |
| 20th | 2017 | Toronto |
| 21st | 2019 | Brisbane |
| | 2021 | Postponed due to COVID-19 |
| 22nd | 2023 | Killarney |
| 23rd | 2025 | Tokyo |

== Other initiatives ==
Besides the World Congress and Prehospital and Disaster Medicine, WADEM has three other initiatives: a biannual newsletter, task forces, and Federated Society memberships.

The biannual newsletter includes news that WADEM's membership may find interesting. WADEM's task forces work to identify problems in specific areas and then work on developing solutions. Task forces include Chemical and Hazardous Materials Accidents, Fire Incidents and Aeromedicine, International Disaster Medical Responses, and Pediatric Disaster Medical Care. The Federated Society memberships are available to other organizations that are involved in specific aspects of prehospital and disaster response. The purpose of the Federated Memberships is to encourage international collaboration and scientific openness. For example, in June 1993, the Mediterranean Burns Club became a Federated Member.

== Influence ==
The UN describes WADEM as "an international association of the world’s disaster and emergency health experts", while Impact says that WADEM has a commitment "to advance the frontier of disaster and emergency research" by focusing on "the scientific investigation of...emergency response."

Elizabeth Weiner says that WADEM's official journal, Prehospital and Disaster Medicine, is one of the "two major journals in emergency planning and response for health care workers", with the other being Disaster Management and Response, an official journal of the U.S.-based Emergency Nurses Association, which last published October–December 2007. In her opinion, Prehospital and Disaster Medicine has more of an international influence than Disaster Management and Response.
