= Cricket diplomacy =

Diplomatic tool

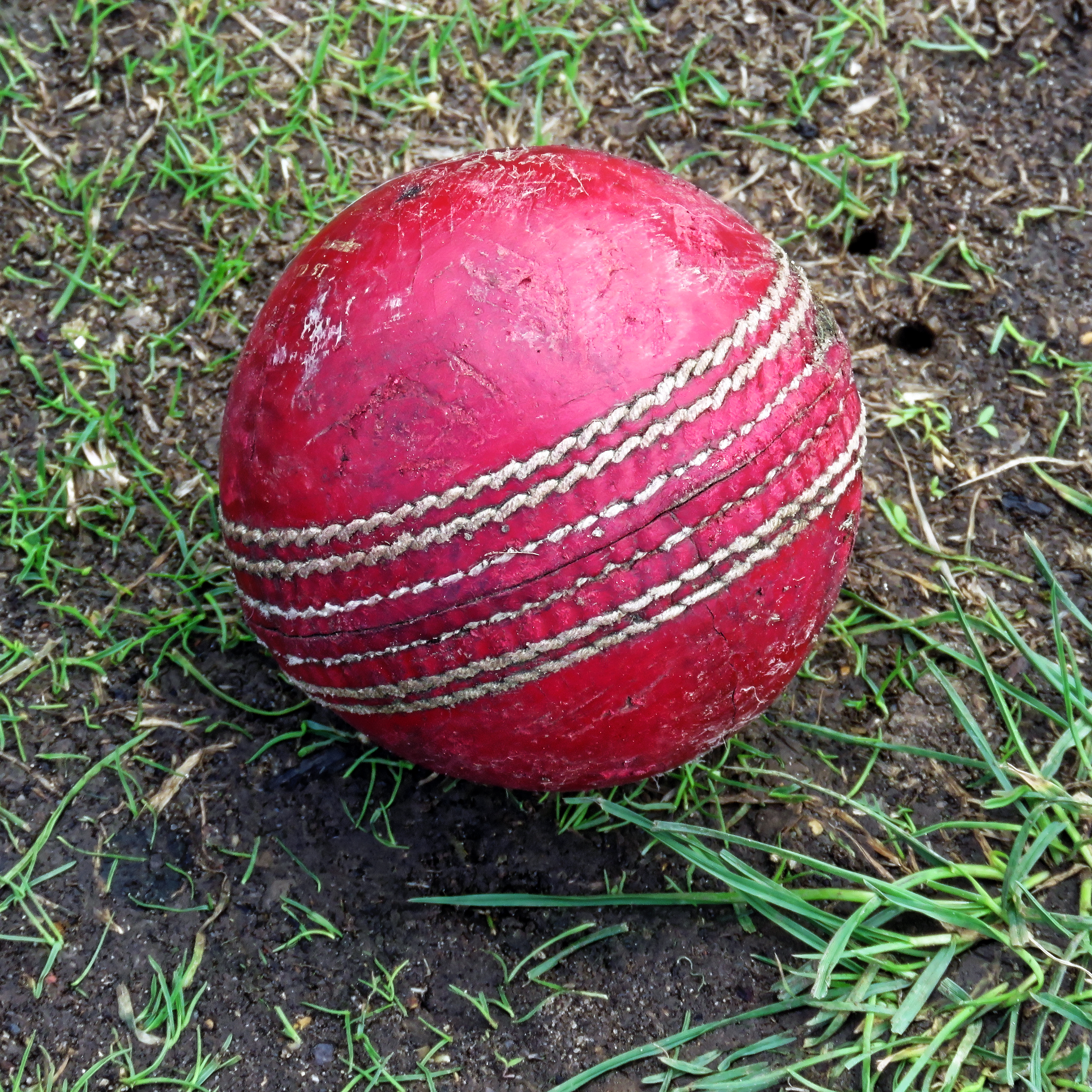
Cricket has had a hand historically in enhancing political ties.

Cricket diplomacy consists of using the game of cricket as a political tool to enhance or worsen the diplomatic relations between two cricket playing nations. Cricket is the second-most widely played game in the world after football, and is thus used as a political tool to bridge gaps in diplomacy between competing countries.

== Australia and England ==
The Bodyline controversy was detrimental to relations between England and Australia. The situation escalated into a diplomatic incident between the countries as the MCC— supported by the British public and still of the opinion that their fast leg theory tactic was harmless — took serious offence at being branded "unsportsmanlike" and demanded a retraction. Many people saw bodyline as fracturing an international relationship that needed to remain strong. Captain Douglas Jardine, and by extension, the entire English team, threatened to withdraw from the fourth and fifth Tests unless the Australian Board withdrew the accusation of unsporting behaviour. Public reaction in both England and Australia was outrage directed at the other nation. The Governor of South Australia, Alexander Hore-Ruthven, who was in England at the time, expressed his concern to British Secretary of State for Dominion Affairs James Henry Thomas that this would cause a significant impact on trade between the nations. The standoff was settled only when Australian prime minister Joseph Lyons met with members of the Australian Board and outlined to them the severe economic hardships that could be caused in Australia if the British public boycotted Australian trade. Given this understanding, the Board withdrew the allegation of unsportsmanlike behaviour two days before the fourth Test, thus saving the tour.

There were significant consequences for Anglo-Australian relations, which remained strained until the outbreak of World War II made cooperation paramount. Business between the two countries was adversely affected as citizens of each country displayed a preference for not buying goods manufactured in the other. Australian commerce also suffered in British colonies in Asia: the North China Daily News published a pro-bodyline editorial, denouncing Australians as sore losers. An Australian journalist reported that several business deals in Hong Kong and Shanghai were lost by Australians because of local reactions.

English immigrants in Australia found themselves shunned and persecuted by locals, and Australian visitors to England were treated similarly. In 1934–35 a statue of Prince Albert in Sydney was vandalised, with an ear being knocked off and the word "BODYLINE" painted on it.

== India and Pakistan ==
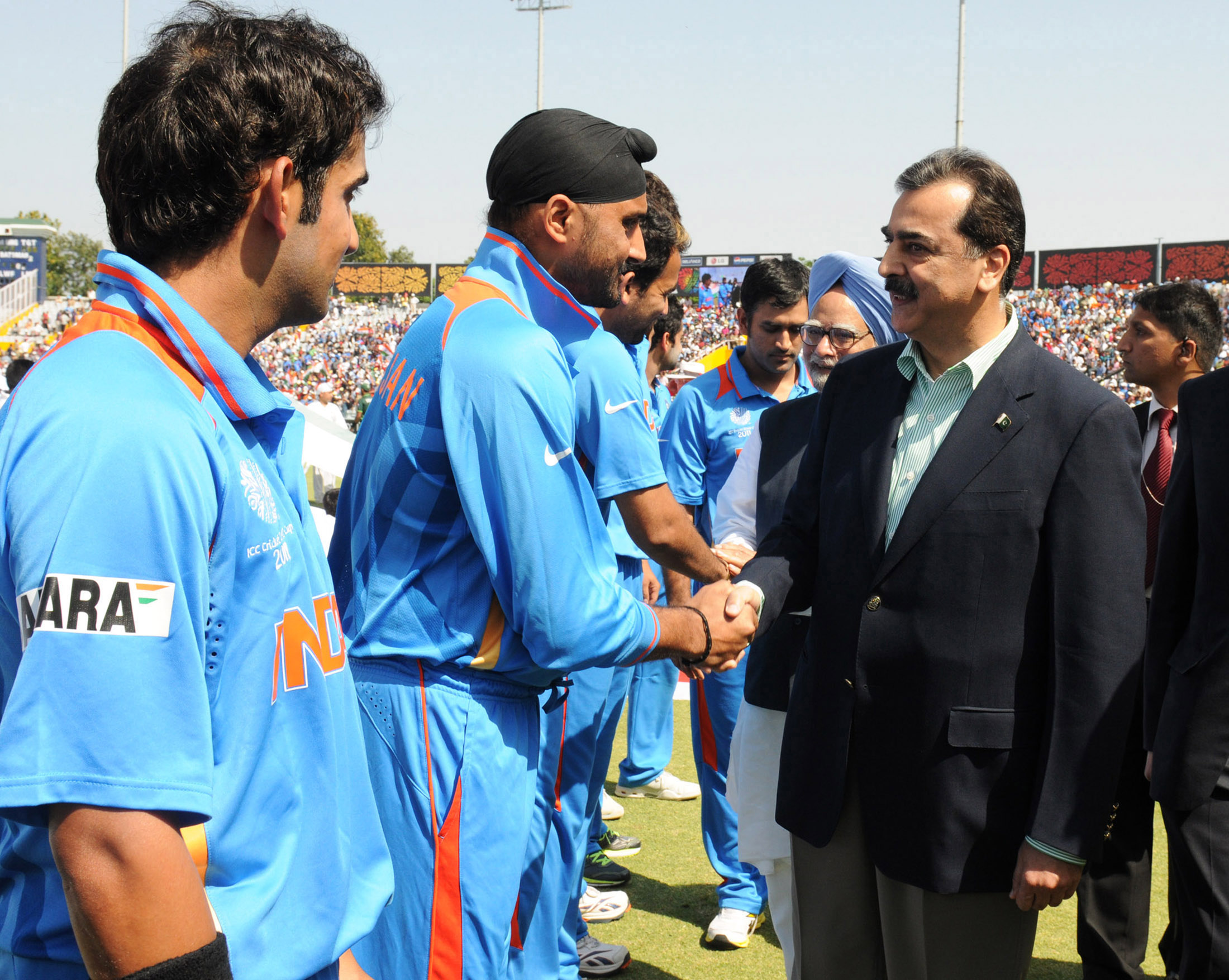
The Prime Minister of India, Manmohan Singh and the Prime Minister of Pakistan, Yousuf Raza Gilani interacting with the Indian Cricket Team ahead of the India vs Pakistan semi-final of the 2011 Cricket World Cup.

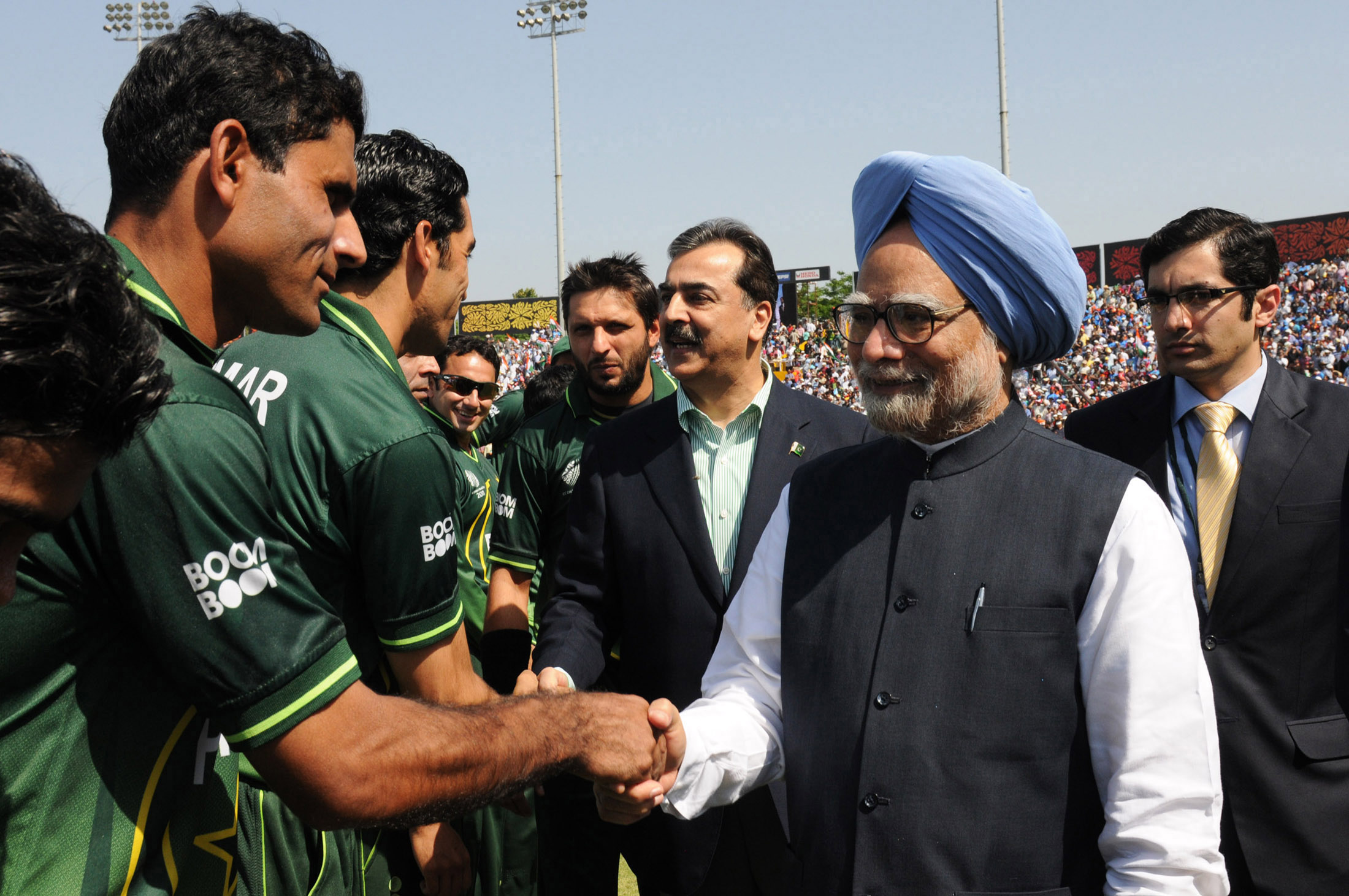
The Prime Minister of India, Manmohan Singh and the Prime Minister of Pakistan, Yousuf Raza Gilani interacting with the Pakistani Cricket Team ahead of the India vs Pakistan semi-final of the 2011 Cricket World Cup.

Following the Soviet invasion of Afghanistan, and Soviet pressure on India to deflect the tension they faced, in February 1987 Pakistan's President at the time, General Zia ul-Haq, attended a test match between India and Pakistan in Jaipur – a visit that apparently helped cool a flare-up in tensions since it led to a meeting with the Prime Minister of India Rajiv Gandhi. Furthermore, in 2004 after a break of fifteen years, India toured Pakistan in the wake of diplomatic initiatives to bury half a century of mutual hostility. Both sides relaxed their tough visa regulations for each other, allowing thousands of fans to travel across the border.

In an attempt to replicate the cricket diplomacy of the past General Pervez Musharraf came to India in 2005 ostensibly for a cricket match. The trip, however, quickly took on the air of a summit as the sides were urged "to seize a historic chance to end their dispute over Kashmir." Often this rivalry has been tinged with a religious-political bent to it. In 1991, the workers of the Indian political party Shiv Sena dug up the cricket pitch at the Wankhede Stadium in Mumbai on the eve of an India-Pakistan Test match which was to be held there, forcing the entire series between the two nations to be cancelled. The Shiv Sena once again used this unique means of protest at the Feroz Shah Kotla in New Delhi in 2000 to protest against the Pakistan cricket team's proposed visit. Following the Kargil conflict, and at various other times, there have also been calls to suspend cricketing ties between the two countries.

During the 2011 Cricket World Cup, the India–Pakistan semi-final is believed to have eased the bilateral relations between the two countries after the polarising 2008 Mumbai attacks. Prime Minister of India Manmohan Singh greeted his Pakistani counterpart Yousuf Raza Gilani to watch the match with him at Mohali. Gilani subsequently accepted the offer and watched the match with Singh.

In July 2012, the foreign secretaries of India and Pakistan met in New Delhi and called for greater sporting ties between the two countries. Days later, the Indian cricket board announced the resumption of bilateral cricket relations with Pakistan, inviting the Pakistani team to India for a short series later that year.

In 2015, Afghanistan President Ashraf Ghani requested the Indian government to allocate a cricket stadium for the Afghan team in India.

== China and Taiwan ==
Extending a form of cultural diplomacy popularly called stadium diplomacy, China has also joined cricket diplomacy. Cross-Strait relations have been the impetus for doing so. During the buildup to the 2007 Cricket World Cup, Antigua received a $55 million grant to build the Sir Vivian Richards Stadium, while Jamaica received $30 million for a new Trelawny stadium. St. Lucia also built both a cricket and a football stadium courtesy of China. China spent a remarkable $132 million on cricket facilities in the West Indies over the past few years, compared to the International Cricket Council's 10-year budget of $70 million to promote cricket globally. The diplomacy paid off in the end as Grenada and Dominica derecognized Taiwan as an independent country. In 2009, of the remaining 24 countries that recognized Taiwan, four were in the Caribbean and two of those played cricket. Previously, Grenada had a stadium built by Taiwan, but it was damaged by a hurricane. To join the action, China quickly came in to erect another stadium. Consequently, Taiwan took Grenada to a New York City court to force the latter to return the original loan.

Taiwan also used the World Cup to shore up its position among its shrinking West Indian support base. It doled out $21 million to St. Kitts and Nevis and $12 million to the even smaller St. Vincent and the Grenadines for cricket grounds. China's aggressive ambitions have benefited the Caribbean Islands as "Strategic analysts say China is laying out more money than is needed to just isolate Taiwan. China, which has built large embassies in each of the islands, now has a bigger diplomatic presence in the Caribbean than the United States, the superpower next door." And that "Mainland China's long-term strategy coincides with its foreign policy."

== India and Australia ==
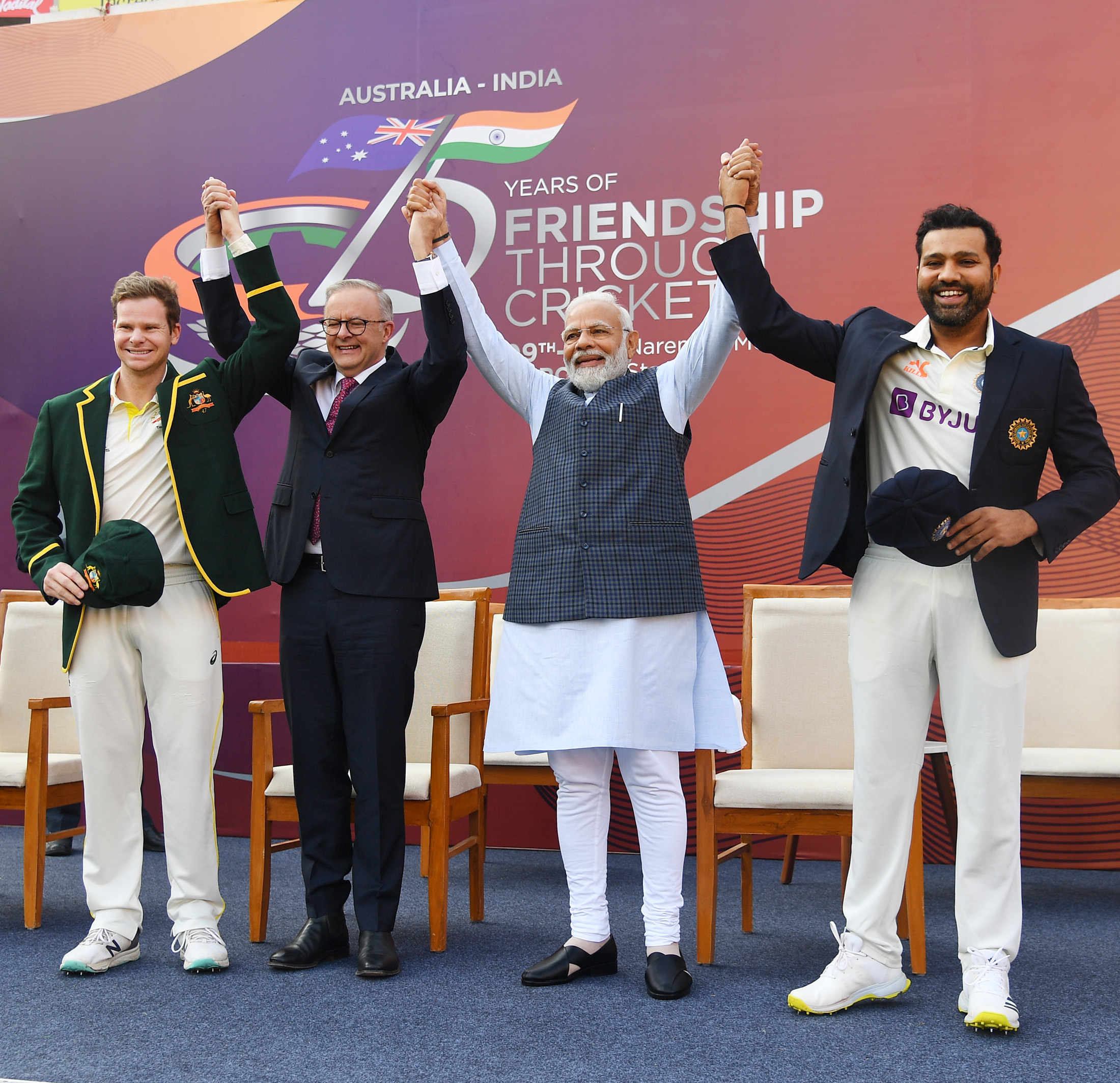
Prime Minister of India, Narendra Modi along with the Prime Minister of Australia, Anthony Albanese at the fourth test of the 2022-23 Border Gavaskar Trophy alongside the captains of the two teams, Rohit Sharma and Steve Smith at the "75 Years of Friendship through Cricket Event.

In March 2023, Prime Minister of India Narendra Modi hosted his counterpart Prime Minister of Australia Anthony Albanese at Narendra Modi stadium on the occasion of fourth test match of 2023 Border Gavaskar trophy. The event was organized as a tribute to the 75 years of diplomatic and cricket relations between two the countries. The two PMs visited the "Hall of fame" museum inside the stadium.

The event began with the two prime ministers singing the national anthems of their respective countries and shaking hands with the players of both teams. They then visited a gallery showcasing glimpses of 75 years of cricket friendship between the two countries. The two PMs visited the "Hall of fame" museum inside the stadium.

The event concluded with the two prime ministers tossing the coin to start the Test match. They sat in the presidential gallery of the stadium and witnessed some of the initial moments of the match.

== England and Zimbabwe ==
In 2008, the England and Wales Cricket Board cancelled Zimbabwe's 2009 tour of England, and the Government of the United Kingdom subsequently suspended all bilateral relations between the two states in response to the situation regarding the 2008 Zimbabwean presidential election. MPs Jack Straw and Tessa Jowell wrote to the International Cricket Council asking them to ban Zimbabwe from international cricket.

== See also ==
- Politics and sports
