= Emergency Medicine Australasia =

- Discipline: Emergency medicine
- Language: English
- Edited by: Geoff Hughes

Publication details
- History: 1991–present
- Publisher: Wiley-Blackwell
- Frequency: Bimonthly
- Impact factor: 1.353 (2017)

Standard abbreviations
- ISO 4: Emerg. Med. Australas.

Indexing
- ISSN: 1742-6731 (print); 1742-6723 (web)

Links
- Journal homepage

Emergency Medicine Australasia (until 2005, Emergency Medicine) is a bimonthly peer-reviewed medical journal covering emergency medicine. It is published by Wiley-Blackwell. It is the official journal of the Australasian College for Emergency Medicine and the Australasian Society for Emergency Medicine. The founding editor was George Jelinek and the current editor-in-chief is Geoff Hughes. According to the Journal Citation Reports, the journal has a 2017 impact factor of 1.353.
