= Australia–India relations =

- Australia: India

Diplomatic mission
- High Commission of Australia, New Delhi: High Commission of India, Canberra

Envoy
- Australian High Commissioner to India Philip Green: Indian High Commissioner to Australia Gopal Baglay

Foreign diplomatic relations between Australia and India are well-established, with both nations sharing a "Comprehensive Strategic Partnership" since both were part of the British Empire. Both are members of the Commonwealth of Nations, and share political, economic, security, lingual and sporting ties. Besides strong trading and migration, culture, arts, music, commercial and international sports like cricket, tennis, and badminton have emerged as a strong cultural connection between the two nations. Military cooperation between Australia and India includes the regular joint naval exercise AUSINDEX. Both countries are part of the Quad. The relationship is supported by the Centre for Australia-India Relations, a government centre within Australia's foreign affairs portfolio.

== History ==
=== Pre-1788 ===
Prior to colonisation of Australia, there is evidence of ancient migration of Indians to Australia around 4,000 to 5,000 years ago based on DNA and language development in native Indians and Indigenous Australians according to a recent study.

=== 1788–1947: Colonial era ===
Australia–India relations
- Australia: India

The ties between Australia and India started immediately following European settlement of Australia in 1788. On the founding of the penal colony of New South Wales, all trade to and from the colony was controlled by the British East India Company, although this was widely flouted. An early ship built in India from Calcutta, the newly renamed Sydney Cove was marooned, with its cargo of rum, off Tasmania, and the crew (including 12 Indian lascars) made a journey in 1796 CE, initially rowing a long boat, and then a long trek from Tasmania to Sydney, with only one Indian and two British sailors surviving.

The Western Australian town of Australind (est. 1841) is a portmanteau word named after Australia and India. Mangalore city is present in both India and Australia (Mangalore, Karnataka, Mangalore, Victoria, Mangalore, Tasmania and Mangalore, Queensland). Australian towns of Cervantes, Northampton and Madura (est. 1876) were used for breeding cavalry horses for the British Indian Army during the late 19th century. The horses were used in the North-West Frontier Province (now Pakistan).

In the early colonies, Indians were brought to Australia as labourers and domestic workers, with migration being curtailed after federation. Gradual migration during the later years of the White Australia policy saw workers moving to Australia especially during periods of labour shortage, such as the Sikhs in Woolgoolga.

India remained an important destination for Australian agricultural exports after the Australian colonies federated in 1901, also importing significant quantities of gold and silver from Australia. In the 1930s, the Australian government's Eastern Trade Advisory Committee assessed trade between Australia and India and found it was hampered by the lack of a direct shipping service. The British India Steam Navigation Company provided an indirect service carrying jute from India to Australia and returning to India with Australian horses. Trade was also hampered by India's high import duties, as Imperial Preference did not apply. In the mid-1930s Australian exports to India were around £800,000 (equivalent to $88,000,000 in 2022) annually.

In December 1939, the Menzies government appointed Roy Gollan as Australia's first official trade representative in India, based in Calcutta. An assistant trade commissioner was later appointed in New Delhi, while Australian interests were also represented on the Eastern Group Supply Council during World War II, establishing "a firm Australian presence in India in the 1940s". In 1944, British prime minister Winston Churchill appointed former Australian government minister Richard Casey as governor of Bengal.

=== 1947–present: After Indian Independence ===
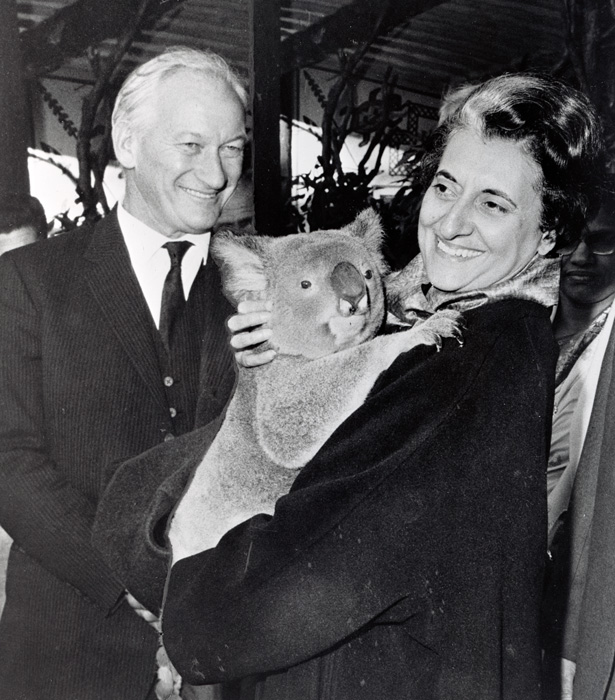
Indian Prime Minister Indira Gandhi holding a koala at Taronga Zoo in 1968, with Sir Arthur Tange, Australian High Commissioner to India, in the background.

After World War II, the Australian government of Ben Chifley supported the independence of India from the British Empire to act as a frontier against communism. Later, under Robert Menzies, Australia supported the admission of India as a Republic to the Commonwealth Nations. In 1950, Menzies became the first Australian prime minister to visit India, where he met with the governor-general Chakravarti Rajagopalachari and Prime Minister Jawaharlal Nehru.

As part of the Colombo Plan, many Indian students were sponsored to come and study in Australia in the 1950s and 1960s. Easing of restrictions in the late 1960s saw an increase in non-European Indians migrating to Australia especially professionals. In 2011–12, Indians were the largest source of permanent migration to Australia. Australia is also the second most popular destination for Indian university students, with nearly 60,000 Indians on student visa in Australia in 2017.

After independence, Australia has maintained relations with both India and Pakistan, with some concern from India over defence sales over the border such as 50 Mirage fighter jets and parts in 2007.

On 30 April 2024, It was reported in the media that in 2020, Australia removed Indian spies from the country.

On November 4, 2024, S. Jaishankar and Jeannette Young jointly opened a new Indian Consulate in Brisbane.

== Diplomatic relations ==
India first established a Trade Office in Sydney, Australia in 1941. It is currently represented by a High Commissioner in the Indian High Commission at Canberra and Consulate generals in Sydney, Perth and Melbourne. Australia has a High Commission in New Delhi, India and Consulates in Mumbai and Chennai. In early 2018, the Australian government announced that a Consulate-General in Kolkata would be established particularly to encourage business with India's growing mining sector.

Besides both being members of the Commonwealth of Nations, both nations are founding members of the United Nations, and members of regional organisations including the Indian Ocean Rim Association for Regional Cooperation and ASEAN Regional forum.

Australia has traditionally supported India's position on Arunachal Pradesh, which is subject to diplomatic disputes between India and the People's Republic of China. In 2023, then Australian high commissioner to India Barry O'Farrell said Arunachal Pradesh was integral to India.

The Sydney Hilton Hotel bombing, a botched attempt to allegedly assassinate the Indian prime minister at a Commonwealth Heads of Government Meeting in 1978 received significant attention at the time.

Although Australia and India sometimes had divergent strategic perspectives during the Cold War, in recent years there have been much closer security relations, including a Joint Declaration on Security Cooperation in 2009.

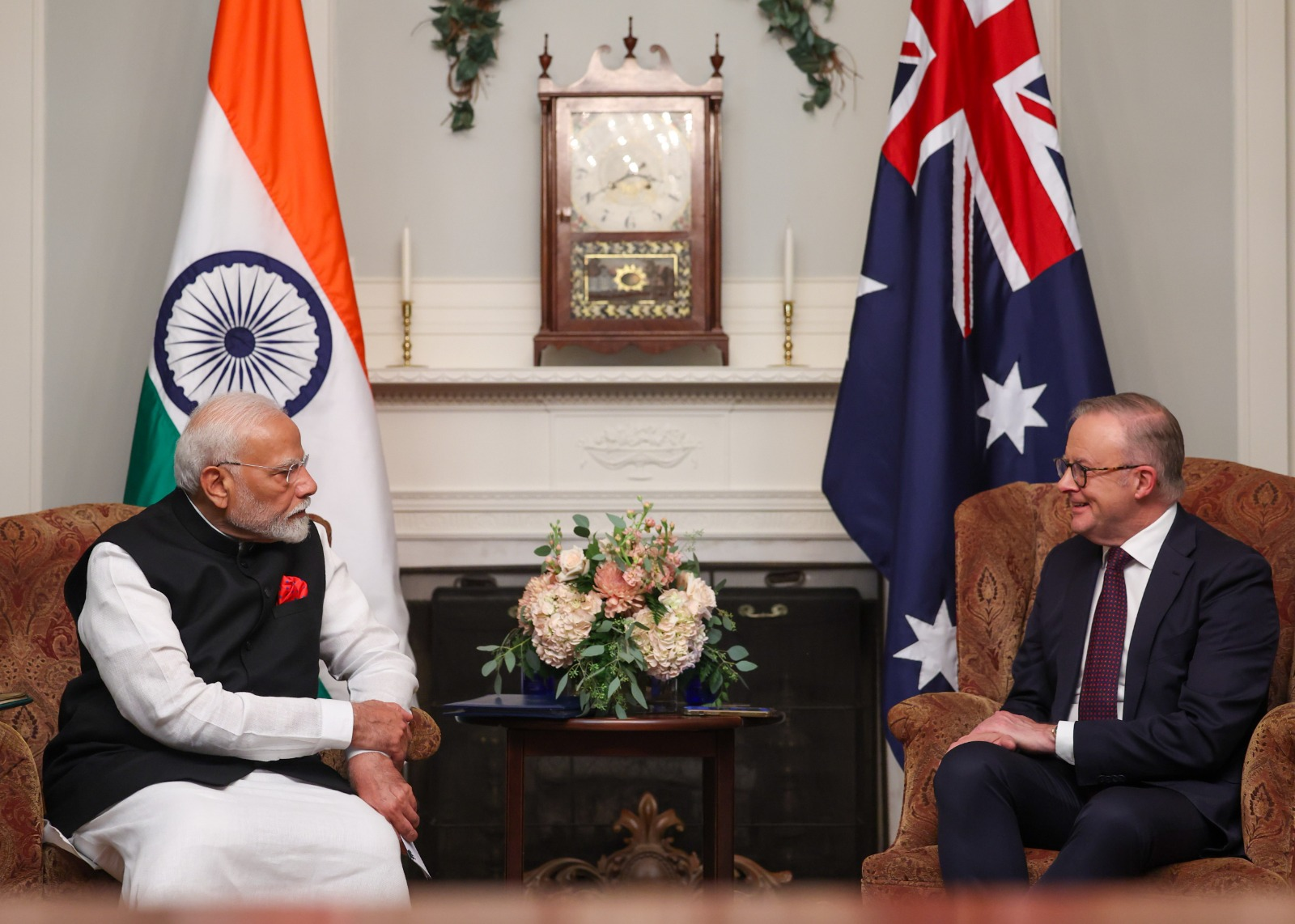
Indian PM Narendra Modi and Australian PM Anthony Albanese in 2024

Recent visits by Indian and Australian prime ministers, such as Tony Abbott's visit in 2014, and later the same year Narendra Modi's visit to Australia - the latter being the first by an Indian prime minister in 28 years, and Malcolm Turnbull's visit in 2017 continued to progress the relationship. During the visit, in Mumbai, Turnbull announced he would commission an independent 'India Economic Strategy' to guide ties out to 2035.

Australian prime minister Scott Morrison was scheduled to visit New Delhi in January 2020, but postponed it due to the bush fires in Australia. The rescheduled plan for May was put on hold due to the outbreak of COVID-19. Instead, on 4 June, Indian prime minister Narendra Modi held his first virtual bilateral summit, with Morrison. Modi started that he hoped to expand the strategic partnership with Australia, against the backdrop of China's renewed efforts to increase its influence in the Indo-Pacific region. The summit occurred amid new tensions between China and Australia over Canberra's call for a global inquiry into the origin of COVID-19, and then-recent Chinese military incursions into territory claimed by India.

In February 2020, Australia made the first political appointee in recent era to the role of High Commissioner to New Delhi, The Hon Barry O'Farrell AO. This began a period of enormous growth in the Australia-India relationship, though O'Farrell acknowledged often his achievements picked up where his predecessor, Harinder Sidhu, had left off. Nonetheless, the first half of O'Farrell's tenure featured unparalleled activity and ambition in the Australia-India relationship: signing a Comprehensive Strategic Partnership; agreeing a free trade deal (ECTA); initiating an Australia-India Foreign and Defence 2+2 Ministerial Dialogue; Australia's re-entry into Exercise Malabar; Australian Navy participation in India's Exercise Milan; establishment of a Strategic National Security Cyber Dialogue; the inaugural Australia-India Circular Economy Hackathon; delivering an Australia-India Business Exchange; and refreshing the India Economic Strategy.

O'Farrell's tenure also featured a high tempo of two way bilateral visits, including: the first visit by an Indian External Affairs Minister to Australia in nine years (February 2022); three visits by an Indian External Affairs Minister to Australia in one year (February 2022, October 2022, February 2023); and twelve Australian ministers visiting India between May 2022 and July 2023, including the historic first visit by Australia's deputy prime minister and defence minister Marles in June 2022. When O'Farrell departed New Delhi, several prominent Indian think tanks, including India Foundation, held farewell events for him with prominent leaders and commentators expressing gratitude for the impact he made on Australia-India relations.

In September 2021, in the first visit to India by Australian ministers since the outbreak of the pandemic, India hosted the inaugural Australia-India Foreign and Defence 2+2 Dialogue.

In March 2022, Prime Minister Morrison announced a suite of initiatives that formed the largest ever boost to bilateral ties with India by an Australian Government, covering the breadth of shared priorities. This included the Centre for Australia-India Relations (CAIR) and expanded diplomatic presence in India and the Indian Ocean.

In March 2022, Australia returned 29 antiquities to India, as part of India's efforts to reclaim its cultural heritage from around the world. The artifacts date back to various time periods, and primarily include sculptures and paintings composed of sandstone, marble, bronze, brass and paper.

Australian prime minister Anthony Albanese visited India in March 2023, making him the first Australian prime minister to visit the country since 2017. Albanese visited Ahmedabad, Mumbai, and New Delhi, and his visit included a tour of India's first indigenously built aircraft carrier, INS Vikrant. Prime Minister Modi visited Australia in May 2023. In September 2023, Albanese visited India for the G20 Summit.

Following the departure of O'Farrell in July 2023, there was a slowdown in diplomatic activity. The new Australian high commissioner, H E Philip Green OAM, arrived with less experience or connections with India in comparison to his recent predecessors. By comparison: O'Farrell had served as the Deputy Chair of the Australia-India Council Board (2015-19), and as Premier of New South Wales (NSW) had established sister-state agreements between NSW and Gujarat and Maharashtra; Harinder Sidhu had personal and cultural ties with India; and Patrick Suckling had served in New Delhi as a junior diplomat.

On 1 July 2025, the CEO of the Centre for Australia India Relations (CAIR) resigned in a shock move, with media reporting the decision was due to "bureaucratic pressures" from Australia's Department of Foreign Affairs and Trade. The resignation sparked concern among commentators about how Australia's bureaucracy was handling the Australia-India relationship.

On 9 July 2026, Indian and Australian prime ministers Narendra Modi and Anthony Albanese signed 18 major agreements spanning defence, energy, education, technology, critical minerals and culture. These included an agreement to export Australian uranium to the Indian nuclear energy industry. Modi and Albanese subsequently addressed a community event at Melbourne's Docklands Stadium, which attracted 20,000 people.

== Trade ==
=== Economic relations ===
Monthly value of Australian merchandise exports to India (A$ millions) since 1988

Monthly value of Indian merchandise exports to Australia (A$ millions) since 1988

While India was Australia's first major trading partner with imports through the East India Company, exports from Australia to India dates back to the late 18th century and early 19th century, when coal from Sydney and horses from New South Wales were exported to India. As of 2016, bilateral trade between the two countries totaled A$21.9 billion, having grown from A$4.3 billion in 2003. Australian prime minister Malcolm Turnbull said Australia and India's $20 billion two-way trade was "a fraction of what we should aspire to, given the many points of intersection between our economies". Trade is highly skewed towards Australia. Australia mainly exports Coal, services (mainly education), vegetables for consumer consumption, gold, copper ores and concentrates, while India's chief exports are refined petroleum, services (professional services such as outsourcing), medicaments, pearls, gems and jewelry. Over 97,000 Indian students enrolled in Australia in 2008, representing an education export of A$2 billion. The Census 2016 of Australia reveals it is home to more migrants from Asia than from Europe.

In the year 2015-16, the total value of trade between Australia and India was A$19.4 billion, a significant increase over the preceding decade. Australian exports included coal, vegetables and gold, and Indian exports included refined petroleum, medicines and business services.

India and Australia have established a $100 million Strategic Research Fund.

In 2018 Australia released its first India Economic Strategy. The Strategy was refreshed in 2022, as a result of the COVID-19 pandemic. In 2024 the strategy was again refreshed, and renamed as a New Roadmap for Australia's Economic Engagement with India. At the release of the third economic strategy in six years, commentators said that Australia re-designing its economic strategy towards India every couple of years demonstrated either a lack of long-term strategy, or officials seeking easy announcements in absence of real outcomes.

=== Uranium export to India ===
After a series of attempts by prime ministers of all parties John Howard, Kevin Rudd, Julia Gillard, and Tony Abbott eventually in 2016 under Malcolm Turnbull, both Australian political parties opened the door for uranium exports, with trade starting in 2017.

=== Trade agreement ===
A notable exception from the Australia and India relationship has been a free trade agreement. Despite warm relationships between India and Australia, a promised free trade agreement seems unlikely, with Australian prime minister Malcolm Turnbull suggesting after his 2017 visit with his counterpart Narendra Modi "It may be that the conclusion will be reached that the parties are too far apart to enable a deal to be reached at this time". Attempts by India to encourage overseas workers in Australia through the loosening of the 457 visa may also have failed as the government attempts to curb, end and/or replace the visa class traditionally used by Indian IT workers.

On 2 April 2022, India-Australia Economic Cooperation and Trade Agreement (ECTA) was signed between the two countries to enhance bilateral economic cooperation and increase trade. The agreement was signed by Piyush Goyal, Union Minister of Commerce and Industry, Consumer Affairs, Food and Public Distribution and Textiles, Government of India and Dan Tehan, the Minister for Trade, Tourism and Investment, Government of Australia in a virtual ceremony, in the presence of Prime Minister of India, Narendra Modi and the prime minister of Australia, Scott Morrison.

PM Albanese visited India in March 2023. During the visit, he also led a trade delegation, which included Trade Minister Don Farrell and Resources Minister Madeleine King, after the implementation of the Economic Cooperation and Trade Agreement (ECTA) between Australia and India on 29 December 2022.

== Military relations ==
Indian Army and Australian Army practised room intervention and slithering ops of small teams by Dhruv helicopter during AustraHind 2022

India and Australia have a long history of military relations, going back before independence when Indian soldiers fought alongside Australian soldiers in a number of campaigns, including both World Wars, such as the 15,000 Indian soldiers who fought with Australians at Gallipoli. Every two years, Australia and India also conduct a joint naval exercise in the Indian Ocean, called AUSINDEX. In 2019, AUSINDEX focused on anti-submarine warfare.

After independence, Australia offered military aid to India in 1963 in response to the Sino-Indian War.

In recent times, India and Australia conducted a joint naval exercise, termed Malabar 2007, in the Indian Ocean alongside the US and Japan.

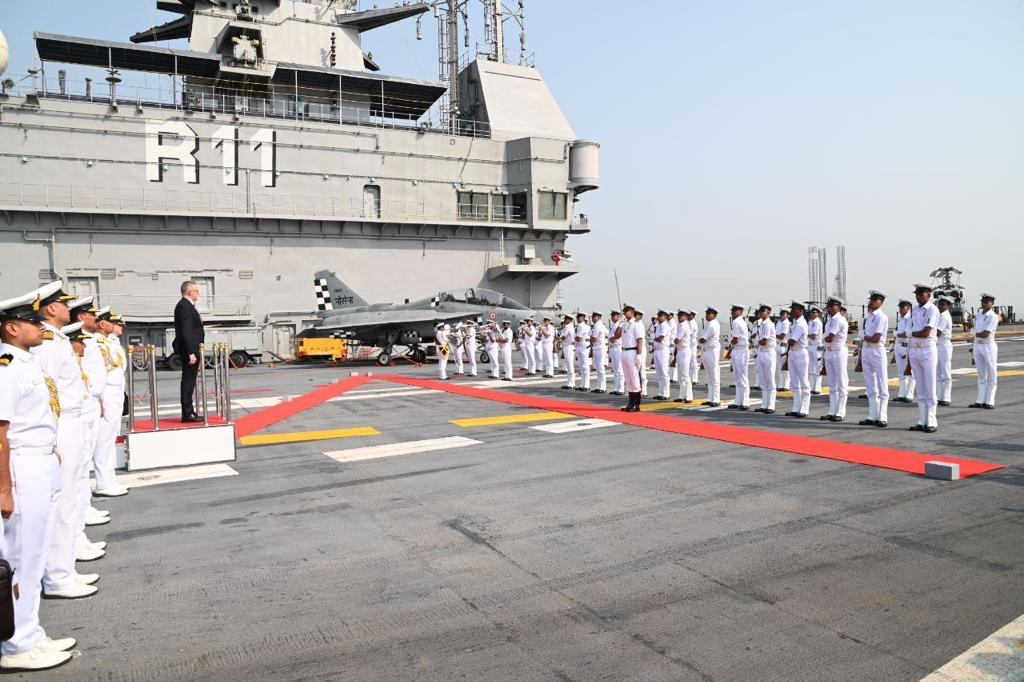
The Prime Minister Anthony Albanese on his visit to India, embarked the indigenous aircraft carrier INS Vikrant and was received with a Guard of Honour.

Some commentators have suggested that there are considerable opportunities for defence and security cooperation between India and Australia. Potential areas in maritime security include in naval exercises and training (such as use of the Australian Submarine Escape Training facility in Fremantle), greater cooperation in humanitarian and disaster relief operations and search and rescue, maritime border protection and maritime domain awareness. There are also opportunities for greater cooperation between the Indian and Australian armies and air forces (reflecting the greater use of shared platforms).

Prime Ministers Abbott and Modi signed a landmark deal to increase their nations defence relationship in November 2014. Part of the framework for security co-operation includes annual Prime Ministerial meetings and joint maritime exercises. Areas of increased co-operation include counter-terrorism, border control and regional and international institutions. Prime Minister Modi stated in an address to the Australian parliament that "This is a natural partnership emerging from our shared values and interests and strategic maritime locations...Security and defence are important and growing areas of the new India-Australia partnership for advancing regional peace and stability and combating terrorism and transnational crimes."

On 4 June 2020, India and Australia signed an agreement to provide access to one another's military bases, in order to help facilitate joint military exercises. Known as the Mutual Logistics Support Agreement, it allows each country to use the other's bases for the refuelling and maintenance of aircraft and naval vessels. The agreement was reached over a virtual summit between prime ministers Narendra Modi and Scott Morrison due to the COVID-19 pandemic.

== Cultural relations ==
=== Sport ===
Long-standing ties through cricket, in particular, have reinforced the popularity of the sport in both countries. Hockey is another sport in which both countries have long been prominent.

In the 21st century, Indian migration to Australia has boosted sports like cricket, as well as exporting traditional Indian games such as kabaddi and kho kho. In addition, there has been increasing interest in Australian rules football in India.

==== Cricket ====
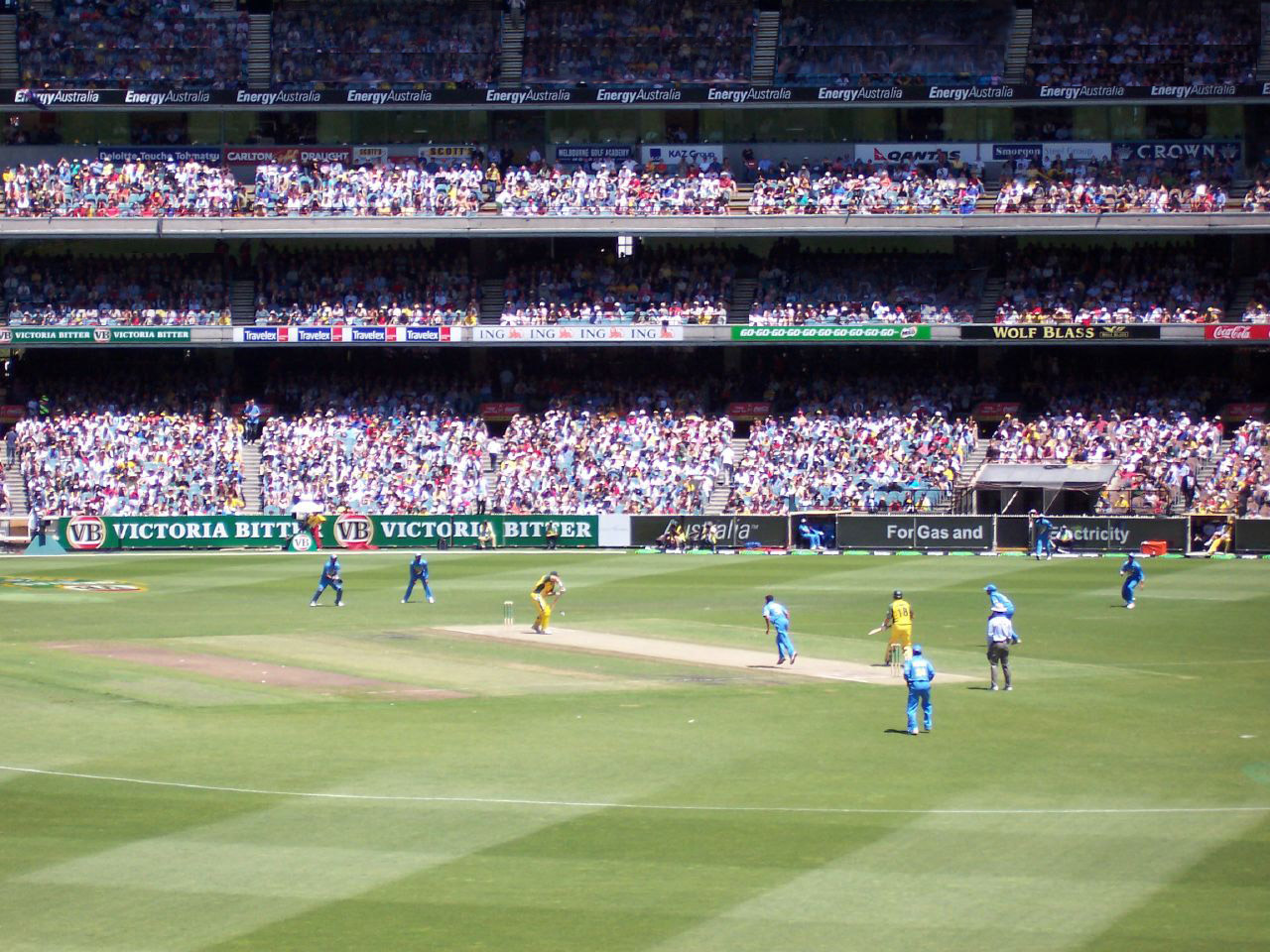
One-day International cricket match between Australia and India, MCG January 2004

A prominent sports passion in both Commonwealth countries is professional cricket. In 1945, the Australian Services cricket team toured India during their return to Australia for demobilisation, and played against the Indian cricket team. However, those matches were not given Test status. The first Test matches between the countries occurred in 1947–48 after the independence of India, when India toured Australia and played five Tests. Australia won 4–0 and as a result, the Australian Board of Control did not invite the Indians back for two decades, fearing that a series of one-sided contests would lead to financial losses due to lack of spectator interest. In the meantime, Australia toured India in late 1956, 1959–60 and 1964–65.

The 1969–70 series in India, which Australia won, were marred by repeated riots. Some were against the Australian team specifically, after the Indian umpires had ruled against the Indian team, while others were not related to on-field conduct, such as a lack of tickets. Several players were hit by projectiles, including captain Bill Lawry, who was hit with a chair. On one occasion, the Australian bus was stoned. The Communist Party of India (CPI), a major political party in West Bengal, protested against Australian batsman Doug Walters, who they mistakenly thought had fought against the communist Vietcong. Around 10,000 communists picketed the Australians' hotel in Calcutta and some eventually broke in and vandalised it. Towards the end of the tour, many former Australian players, some of them administrators, called for the tour to be abandoned for safety reasons, saying that cricket should not descend into violence.

From 1970 until 1996, Australia only toured India twice for Tests. However, with the financial rise of the Board of Control for Cricket in India, Australia, the country with the most successful playing record in the world, has sought more regular fixtures. Test series have occurred every two years for the last decade, and one-day series even more frequently. Scholarships are also given to talented young Indian cricketers to train at the Australian Cricket Academy.

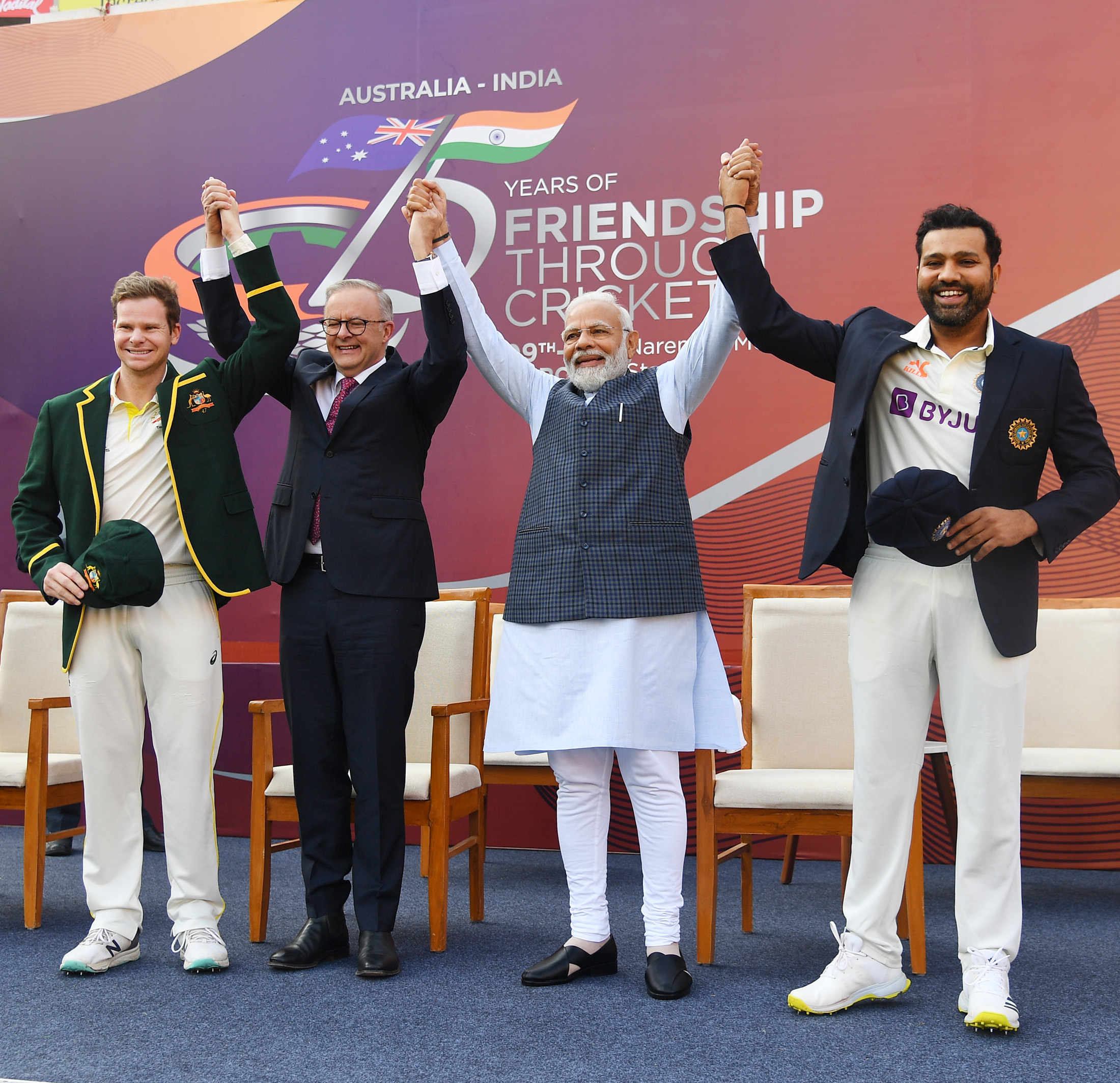
Australian Prime Minister Anthony Albanese (left) and Indian Prime Minister Narendra Modi with the cricket team captains at the 75 Years of Friendship through Cricket Event.

In January 2008, relations became strained after the second test in Sydney. The match, which ended in a last-minute Australian victory, was marred by a series of umpiring controversies, and belligerent conduct between some of the players. At the end of the match, Harbhajan Singh was charged with racially abusing Andrew Symonds, who had been subjected to monkey chants by Indian crowds on a tour a few months earlier. Harbhajan was initially found guilty and given a ban, and the Board of Control for Cricket in India threatened to cancel the tour. Harbhajan's ban was later repealed upon appeal and the tour continued. Both teams were heavily criticised for their conduct. During Australia's tour in India there were a number of controversies instigated on both sides, culminating in Virat Kohli saying his friendship with Australia coming to an end. He later clarified the comments and said “I thought that was the case, but it has changed for sure. As I said, in the heat of the battle you want to be competitive but I’ve been proven wrong. The thing I said before the first Test [about being mates with Australia], that has certainly changed and you won’t hear me say that ever again.”

However cricket, and more recently Indian Premier League has been considered "the lifeblood of the Australia-India relationship", and Australian cricketers like David Warner, Shane Warne, Adam Gilchrist and Brett Lee are immensely popular among the Indian people. Likewise, Sachin Tendulkar and Virat Kohli are highly regarded among Australian cricket lovers. Over 20% of Australian cricket players have South Asian heritage.

In March 2023, PM Narendra Modi hosted his counterpart PM Anthony Albanese during the fourth test match of the 2024 Border–Gavaskar Trophy, as a tribute to the 75 years of diplomatic relations between the two countries.

==== Hockey ====
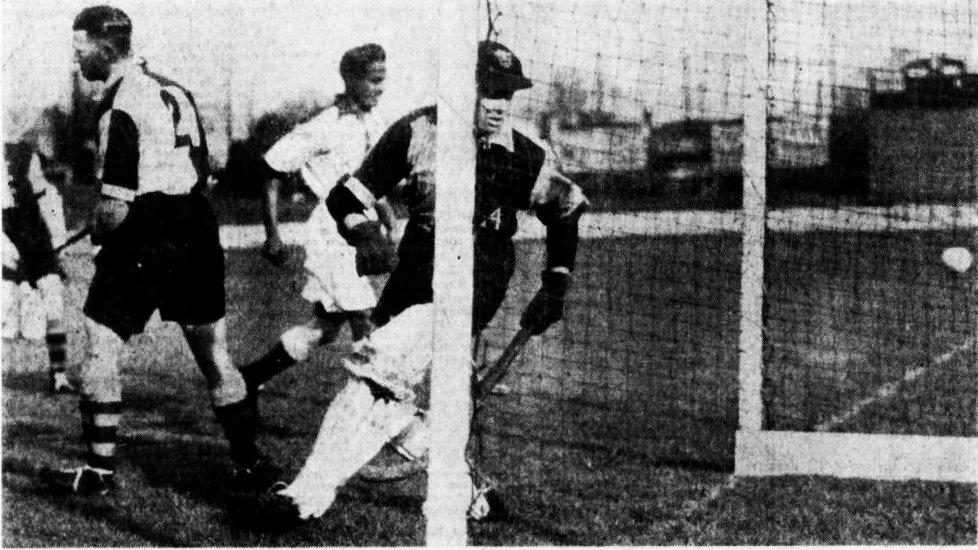
India v Australia 1935. Dhyan Chand had just hit a goal

India and Australia also have strong ties to field hockey which came to both countries with the British military. In India from the mid-19th century, British army regiments played the game which was subsequently picked up by their India regimental counterparts. The country's first hockey club was formed in Calcutta in 1885–86. Hockey in Australia was introduced by British naval officers in the late 19th century. Evidence of the first organised hockey there was the establishment of the South Australian Hockey Association in 1903.

Teams from both countries have been among the top in the world for many years and have therefore frequently encountered each other on the hockey field. India dominated world hockey between 1928 and 1956, with the men's team winning six consecutive Olympic gold medals. The women's team won gold in 2002 Commonwealth Games, 2003 Afro-Asian Games and 2004 Asia Cup. Australia has found success mainly since the late 1970s, with the men's and women's teams winning gold medals at Olympic Games, World Cup, Champion's Trophy and Commonwealth Games meets.

The first international match between the two countries and the first international match played in Australia was at Richmond Cricket Ground in 1935, when the world champion team from India beat Australia 12 goals to one. The visitors featured hockey supremo Dhyan Chand.

Following the partition of India in 1947, Anglo-Indian brothers Julian, Eric, Cec, Mel and Gordon Pearce, emigrated to Australia from India. All five went on to become successful international players for their adopted country. When India faced Australia in the 1960 Rome Olympics, The great Leslie Claudius an Anglo-Indian captained India, his opposite number Kevin Carton also an Anglo Indian was the captain of the Australian national team who lost 0–1 to India.

== Expatriates ==
=== Non-resident Indian and person of Indian origin ===
India has the largest diaspora population in the world, and many live in Australia. Non resident Indians (NRI) and Persons of Indian Origin (PIO) maintain strong cultural and economic links with India. However, the Constitution of India does not allow dual citizenship, so for many expatriates taking up residency, and eventually citizenship in Australia, has led to loss of privileges in India, such as residency rights. India is one of the few remaining countries that prevent dual citizenship, and there have been attempts to resolve this, through Long Term Visas and more recently a pseudo-citizenship Overseas Citizenship of India (OCI) has been created that has been taken up positively, with many Australians OCIs, cricketer Shaun Tait being a famous example, who are able to take residency in India without applying for a visa. However privileges of OCI holders depends on the Government policy of the day, and there have been instances where they have been denied additional rights afforded to full Indian citizens, such as during the 2016 Indian banknote demonetisation where non-citizens, including OCIs were denied rights to bring rupee notes back into the country.

=== Issues and controversies ===
There have been a number of incidents concerning citizens of both countries that received media attention:

- 2007 - Mohamed Haneef, was falsely accused of terrorism related crimes. He was later released and compensated.
- 2009 - Attacks on Indian students, including the murder of Indian graduate and Australian permanent resident Nitin Garg in 2010
- A number of Overseas trained doctors in Australia of Indian origin have been accused (sometimes unfairly) of professional violations.
- 2020 – Australia' domestic intelligence agency, the Australian Security Intelligence Organisation, expelled two operatives from India's foreign intelligence service, the Research and Analysis Wing, alleging they were part of an operation seeking to cultivate politicians, monitor diaspora communities and obtain classified information.

== Treaties ==
A number of treaties before Indian independence or Australian federation are still honoured, such as extradition treaties and criminal cooperation. Since Indian independence, there have been several treaties between the two countries:

- Postal, Money Order and Air service treaties.
- Commonwealth of Nations treaties.
- Cooperative aid to other countries.
- Mutual protection of Patents in 1963.
- A cultural agreement in 1971.
- An agreement to discuss trade in 1976
- Science and Technology cooperation agreements in 1975 and 1986.
- Australia has been involved with peace keeping missions between India and Pakistan.
- Taxation cooperation treaties in 1983, 1991, and 2011.
- Development cooperation agreement in 1990.
- Promoting and protecting investments in 2000.
- Peaceful use of Nuclear Energy in 2014 in order to purchase uranium from Australia.
- A Social Security agreement in 2016.

== Resident diplomatic missions ==
- Australia has a High Commission in New Delhi and consulates-general in Bengaluru, Chennai, Kolkata and Mumbai.
- India has a High Commission in Canberra and consulates-general in Melbourne, Perth, Sydney and Brisbane.
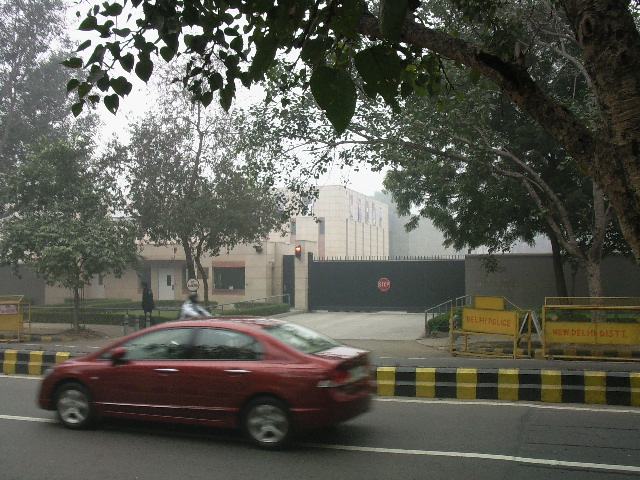
High Commission of Australia in New Delhi

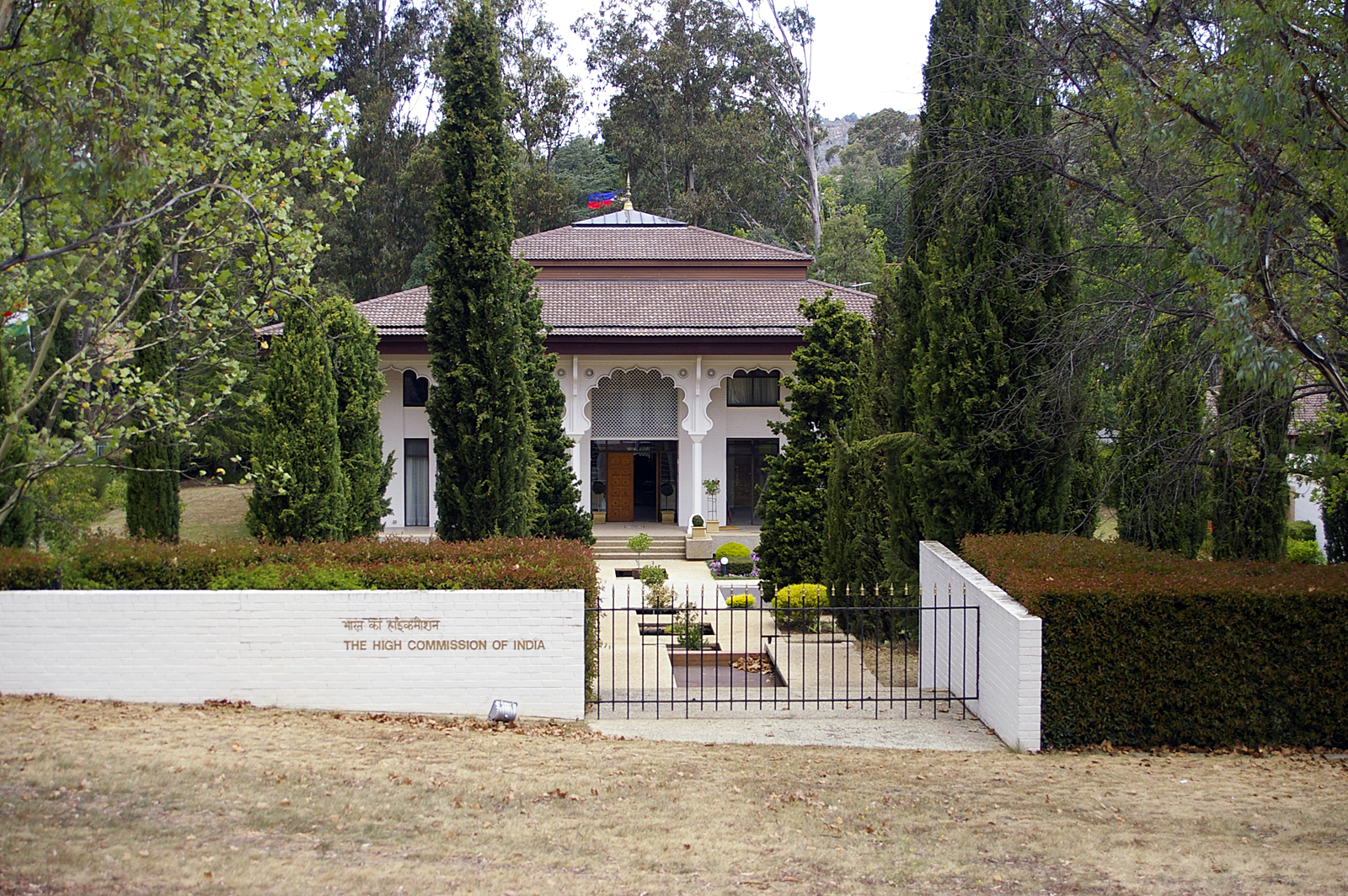
High Commission of India in Canberra

== See also ==
- Indian Australians
  - Hinduism in Australia, Hinduism is Indian-origin religion
  - Buddhism in Australia, Buddhism is Indian-origin religion
  - Jainism in Australia, Jainism is Indian-origin religion
  - Sikhism in Australia, Sikhism is Indian-origin religion
  - Anti-Indian sentiment in Australia
- Australians in India
- Quadrilateral Security Dialogue
- Non-resident Indian and person of Indian origin

== Links ==
- PM Narendra Modi being accorded a Ceremonial Welcome at Australian Parliament, Canberra
