= Australians in India =

Ethnic group in India

Total population
- 3,000 - 4,000

Regions with significant populations
- New Delhi · Mumbai · Hyderabad · Bangalore · Chennai

Languages
- English · Indian languages

Religion
- Christianity · Hinduism · Islam

Related ethnic groups
- Australian diaspora

There is a community of Australians in India, consisting mostly of expatriates and migrants from Australia, as well as some Australian OCIs. Australia has a High Commission in New Delhi and Consulates in Mumbai and Chennai.

== Overview ==
According to the Australian High Commission, there are about 3,000 to 4,000 Australians living and working in India. Industries such as hospitality, financial services, and mining and materials have a relatively higher concentration of Australian expatriates. About 1,000 Australian companies evince interest in doing projects in India every year, despite the challenges of "bureaucracy" and "delays," as opportunities outnumber these impediments. At present, there are about 60 Australian companies working in the infrastructure sector in India. Large Australian firms such as BHP, Rio Tinto, SMEC Holdings, Macquarie Group, and CIMIC Group have operations in India.

There are also many Australian cricketers wanting to get into the Indian Premier League.

== In popular culture ==
- Shantaram - a 2003 novel by Gregory David Roberts based on Roberts' own experiences in Mumbai

== Notable people ==
- Anne Warner - Australian state politician (born in India)
- Bob Christo - Indian actor
- King Kong - Professional wrestler & actor
- Fearless Nadia - Indian film actress & stunt-woman
- Graham Staines - Australian missionary & physician
- Gregory David Roberts - Australian author, former addict & convicted bank robber
- Isha Sharvani - Indian actress & dancer
- Pallavi Sharda - Film/Theatre actress and dancer
- Peter Varghese - High Commissioner of Australia to India from 2009-2012, migrated from India to Australia in childhood

== Business and social associations ==
There are a number of business and social organizations for Australians in India including:

- Australian and New Zealand Business Association (ANZBAI), Mumbai
- Australian, New Zealand Association (ANZA), Delhi
- Indo-Australian Chamber of Commerce (IACC), Chennai

== See also ==
- Australia–India relations
- Australian diaspora
- Immigration to India
- Indian Australians
- Australians in the United Kingdom
