= 75 Years of Friendship through Cricket Event =

Diplomatic cricket event

Fourth Test, 2022–23 Border–Gavaskar Trophy
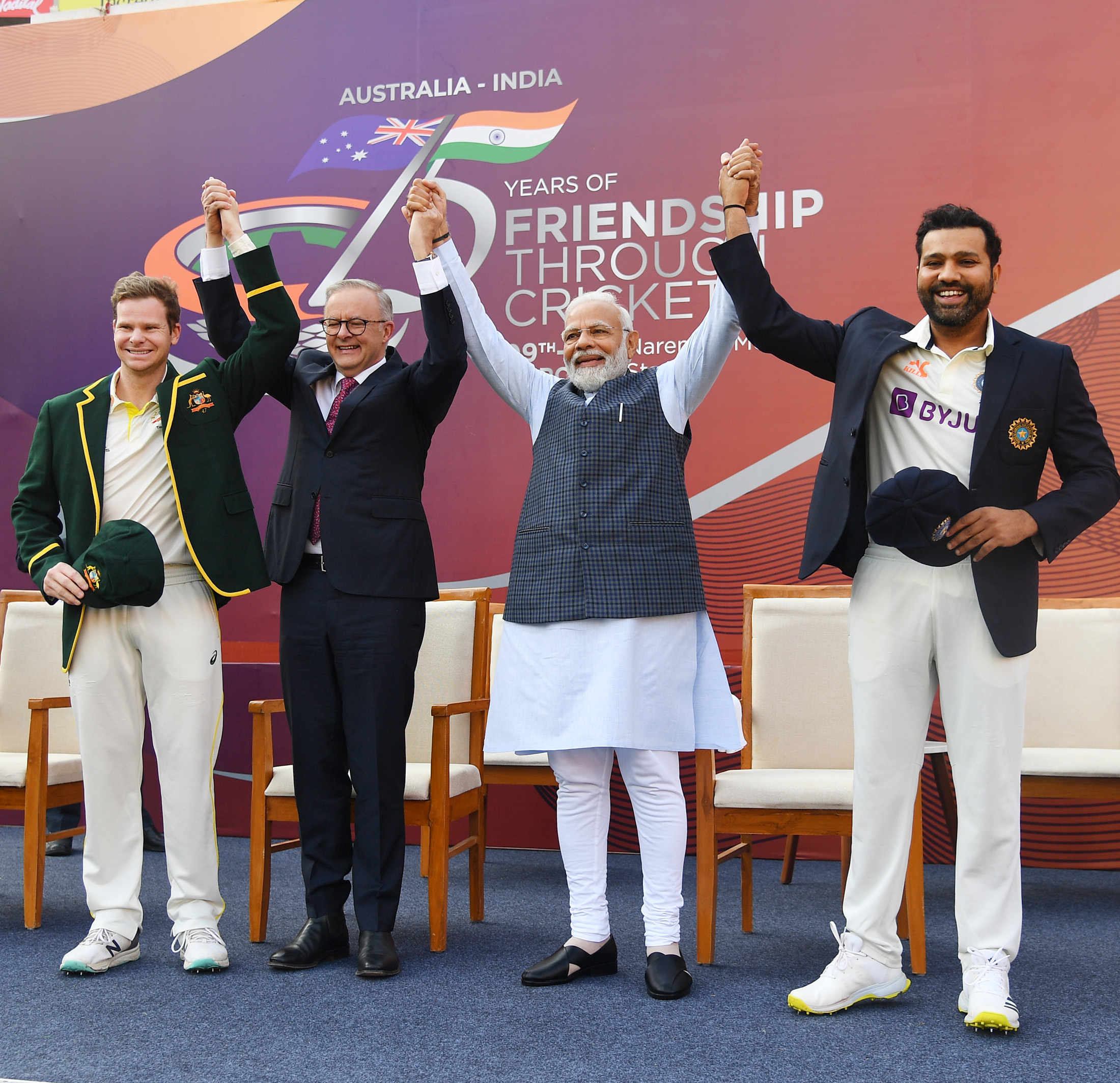
- Australian PM Anthony Albanese (second from left) and Indian PM Narendra Modi with the Australia cricket team captain Steve Smith (far left) and India cricket team skipper Rohit Sharma (far right) at the event.
- Date: 9–13 March 2023
- Time: 5 days
- Duration: 5 days
- Location: Sardar Patel Stadium, Ahmedabad, Gujarat, India
- Organized by: Government of India; Board of Control of Cricket in India
- Participants: 50,000

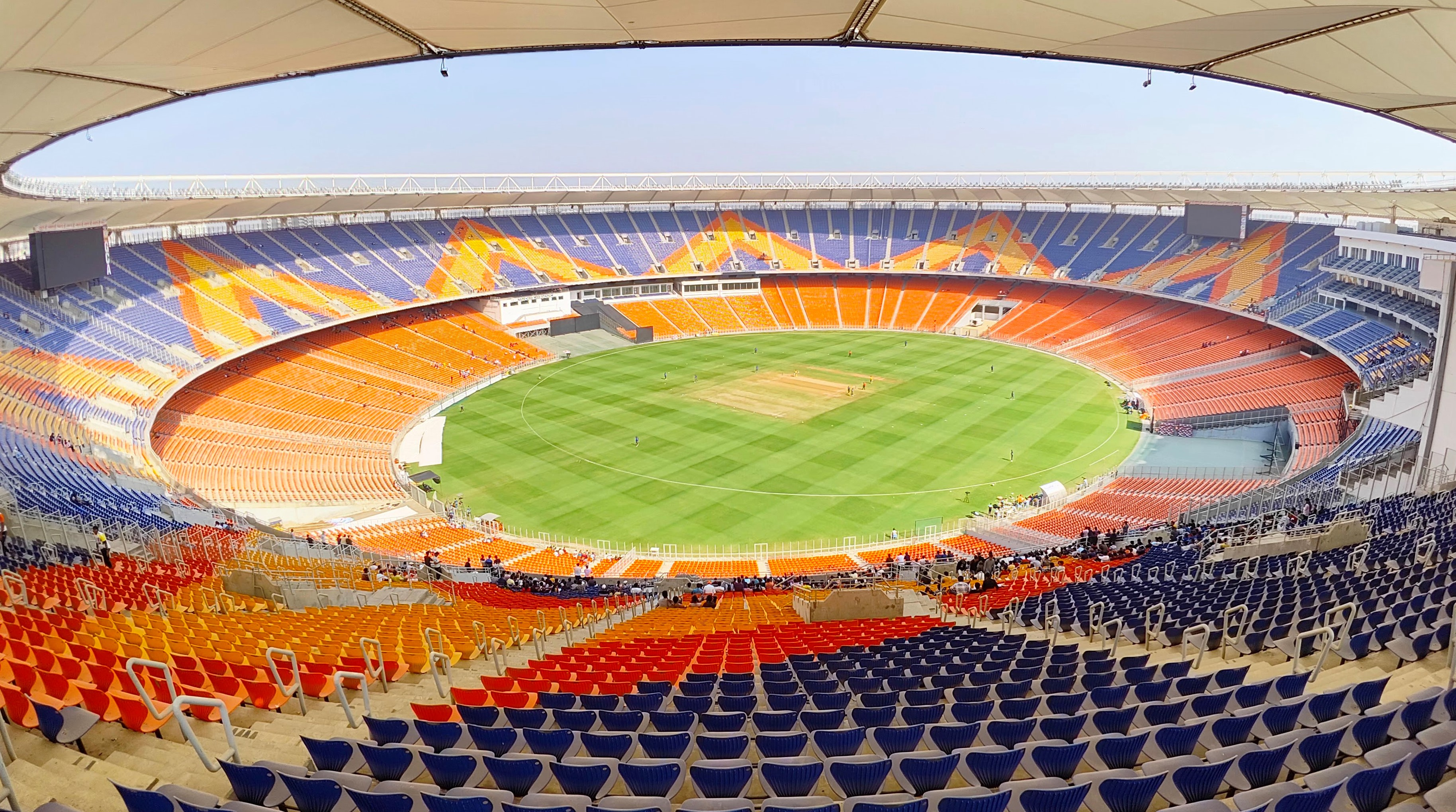
The Narendra Modi Stadium

The 75 Years of Friendship through Cricket Event was an event hosted by Narendra Modi, the Prime Minister of India, who invited his counterpart Prime Minister of Australia Anthony Albanese for a Test match to celebrate 75 years of diplomatic ties on 9 March 2023, exercising cricket diplomacy. The 75 Years of Friendship through Cricket Event was a celebration of the strong ties between India and Australia.

It was the fourth and final test match of the 2023 iteration of the Border–Gavaskar Trophy, and the match was drawn after Australia declared their second innings. India won the series 2–1.

== Background ==
=== Diplomatic ties ===
Foreign diplomatic relations between Australia and India are well-established, with both nations sharing a "Comprehensive Strategic Partnership" since both were part of the British Empire. Both are members of the Commonwealth of Nations, and share political, economic, security, lingual and sporting ties. Besides strong trading & migration and culture, sports such as cricket have emerged as a strong cultural connection between the two nations.

On 2 April 2022, India-Australia Economic Cooperation and Trade Agreement (IndAus ECTA) was signed between the two countries to enhance bilateral economic cooperation and increase trade. The agreement was signed by Piyush Goyal, Union Minister of Commerce and Industry, Consumer Affairs, Food and Public Distribution and Textiles, Government of India and Dan Tehan, the Minister for Trade, Tourism and Investment, Government of Australia in a virtual ceremony, in the presence of Prime Minister of India, Narendra Modi and the Prime Minister of Australia, Scott Morrison.

PM Albanese visited India in March 2023. During the visit, he also led a trade delegation, which included Trade Minister Don Farrell and Resources Minister Madeleine King, after the implementation of the Economic Cooperation and Trade Agreement (ECTA) between Australia and India on 29 December 2022. It was during this trip when Albanese attended the "75 Years of Friendship through Cricket Event".

=== Cricketing ties ===
In 1996, the Border–Gavaskar Trophy was created, a test series played between Australia and India, named after 2 legendary test players – Sunil Gavaskar of India and Allan Border of Australia. India has won the trophy ten times, while Australia has won it five times with one series ending in a draw. The event took place in the 2023 edition of the series.

India and Australia have also participated in other major global cricket tournaments and are both ICC member nations. As of 2024, Australia has won 6 Cricket World Cups while India has 2; India has won 2 T20 World Cups while Australia has 1. India has won 3 Champions Trophies while Australia has won 2.

"Australia was the first country in the world with whom India had formal diplomatic relations after independence, and cricket has been at the heart of their relationship. Indeed, months after independence, Australia and India played first test match together when India toured Australia in 1947–48. And cricket is perhaps the best symbol of what we have in common as two countries."

— Richard Marles, the Deputy Prime and Defence Minister of Australia to the parliament a few days before the event.

== Attendance ==
- Narendra Modi, The Prime Minister of India
- Anthony Albanese, The Prime Minister of Australia
- Bhupendra Patel, The Chief Minister of Gujarat
- Acharya Devvrat, The Governor of Gujarat
- Roger Binny, The President of Board of Control for Cricket in India
- Ravi Shastri, Former Indian player and coach
- Jay Shah, The Secretary of Board of Control for Cricket in India
- 50000 spectators.

== The event ==
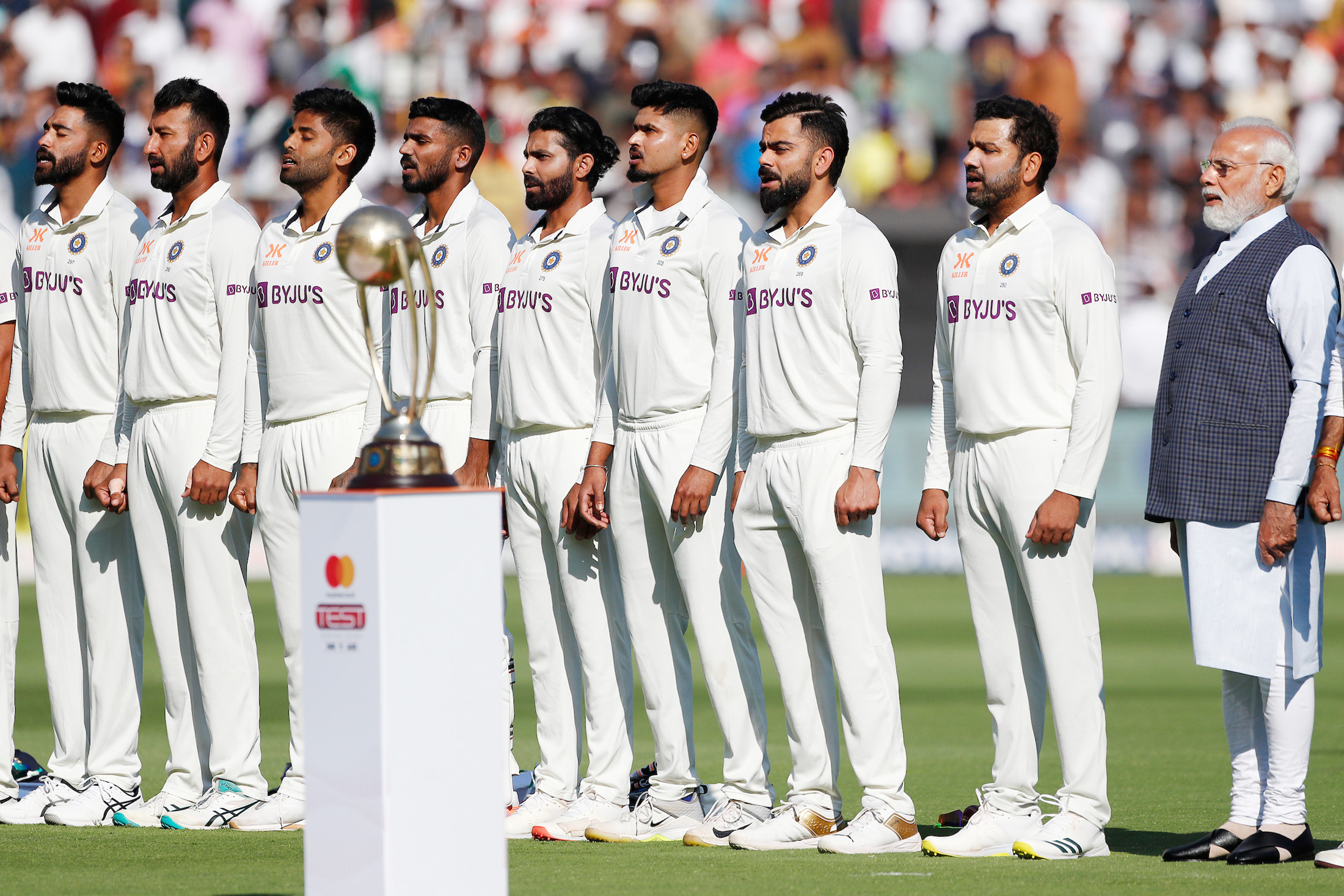
The Indian cricket team along with PM Modi singing the Indian national anthem

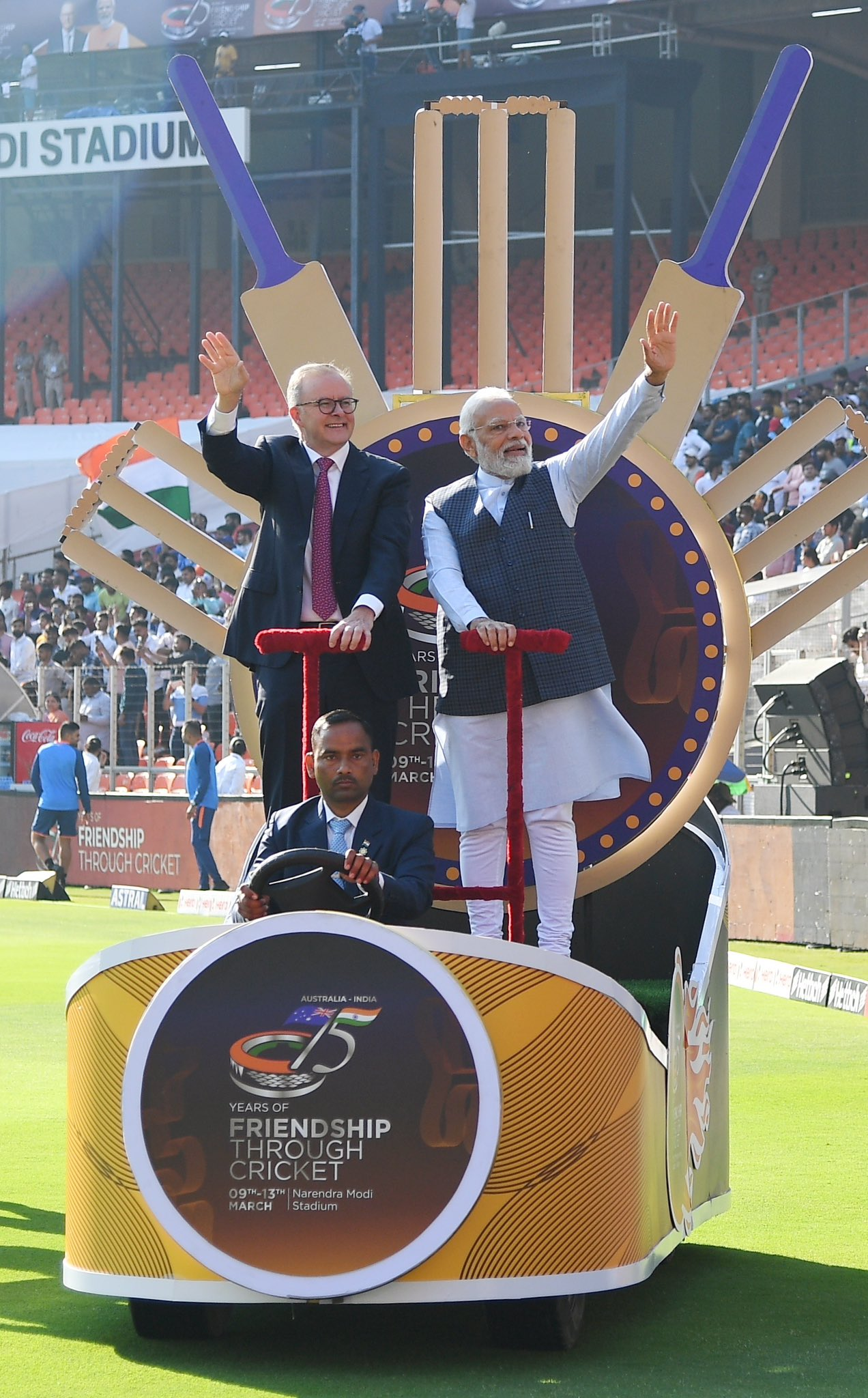
The two PMs taking a lap around the stadium.

The Gujarat Chief Minister Bhupendra Patel reached earlier to inspect the stadium. Banners of the two prime ministers and players of both sides were put up.

Albanese later announced that his country and the Indian government have finalized the Australia-India Education Qualification Recognition Mechanism. He made the announcement at a program where it was officially announced that Australia's Deakin University would set up an international branch campus at GIFT City in Gujarat's Gandhinagar. He also announced the completion of the ECTA agreement.

“There is a significant development in our bilateral education relation. I am pleased to tell you that we have finalised Australia-India Education Qualification Recognition Mechanism.” – Anthony Albanese

The event began with the two prime ministers singing the national anthems of their respective countries and shaking hands with the players of both teams. They then visited a gallery showcasing glimpses of 75 years of cricket friendship between the two countries. The two PMs visited the "Hall of fame" museum inside the stadium.

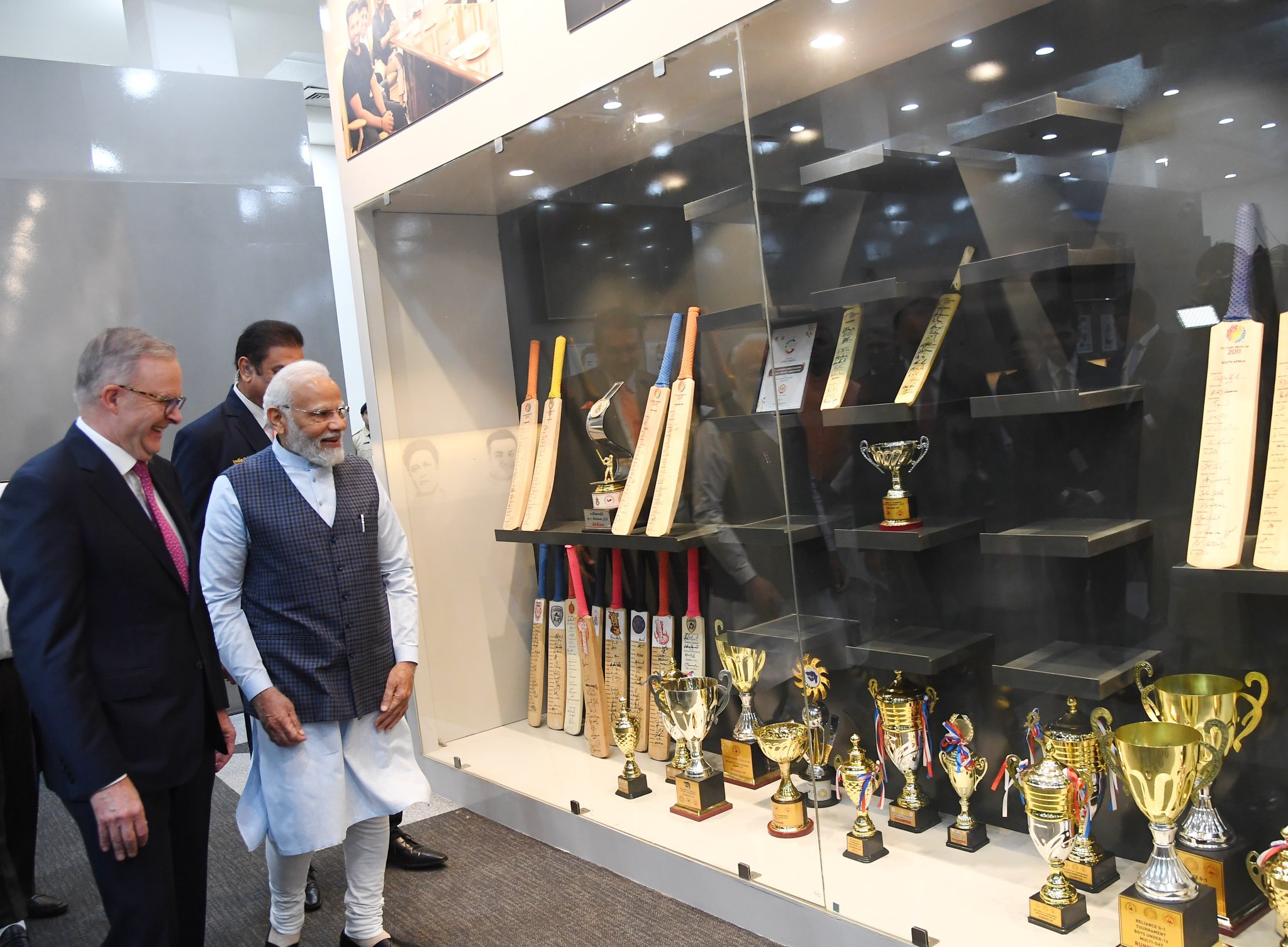
Modi and Albanese at the "Hall of Fame" gallery in the stadium.

After the gallery visit, the two prime ministers took a lap of honor around the stadium in a specially designed golf cart. They were greeted by loud cheers from the crowd, who waved Indian and Australian flags. The Prime Ministers met the playing teams and motivated them for the game, as well as handed over caps to their respective team captains – Rohit Sharma of India and Steve Smith of Australia. Before the start of the match, traditional display of Garba was showcased in front of the dignitaries and the crowd gathered.

The Prime Ministers were presented with portraits of themselves – Modi was presented his by BCCI secretary Jay Shah while Albanese was presented his by BCCI President Roger Binny.

The event concluded with the two prime ministers tossing the coin to start the Test match. The coin for the toss was specially designed for the occasion. They sat in the presidential gallery of the stadium and witnessed some of the initial moments of the match.

While the event was hailed by the BJP, the ruling party in India, it was opposed by opposition; with INC leader Jairam Ramesh tweeting: “Doing a lap of honour in a stadium you named after yourself in your own lifetime – height of self-obsession.”

== The match ==
=== Match summary ===
9–13 March 2023
Scorecard

Australia	v	India
480 (167.2 overs); Usman Khawaja 180 (422); Ravichandran Ashwin 6/91 (47.2 overs)		571 (178.5 overs); Virat Kohli 186 (364); Todd Murphy 3/113 (45.5 overs)
175/2d (78.1 overs); Travis Head 90 (163); Axar Patel 1/36 (19 overs)

Narendra Modi Stadium, Ahmedabad
Umpires: Richard Kettleborough (Eng) and Nitin Menon (Ind)

- Australia won the toss and elected to bat.
- Cameron Green (Aus) scored his maiden century in Tests.
- Ravichandran Ashwin (Ind) became the leading wicket taker in matches vs Australia, as well as the leading wicket taker in the Border–Gavaskar Trophy, overtaking Nathan Lyon (Aus), before Lyon regained the top spot in the same match.
- Cheteshwar Pujara (Ind) became the fourth batsman, to score 2,000 runs against a single team in Tests.
- Rohit Sharma (Ind) scored his 17000th run in international cricket, being the 6th Indian cricketer to do so.
- Virat Kohli (Ind) became the second Indian to take 300 catches in International cricket. Kohli also scored 4,000 Test runs in India and became the fifth cricketer to achieve this feat.
- Axar Patel became the fastest bowler for India to take fifty test wickets, in terms of balls bowled (2205), with the wicket of Travis Head (Aus).
- World Test Championship points: India 4, Australia 4.

=== Description ===
==== First Australian innings ====
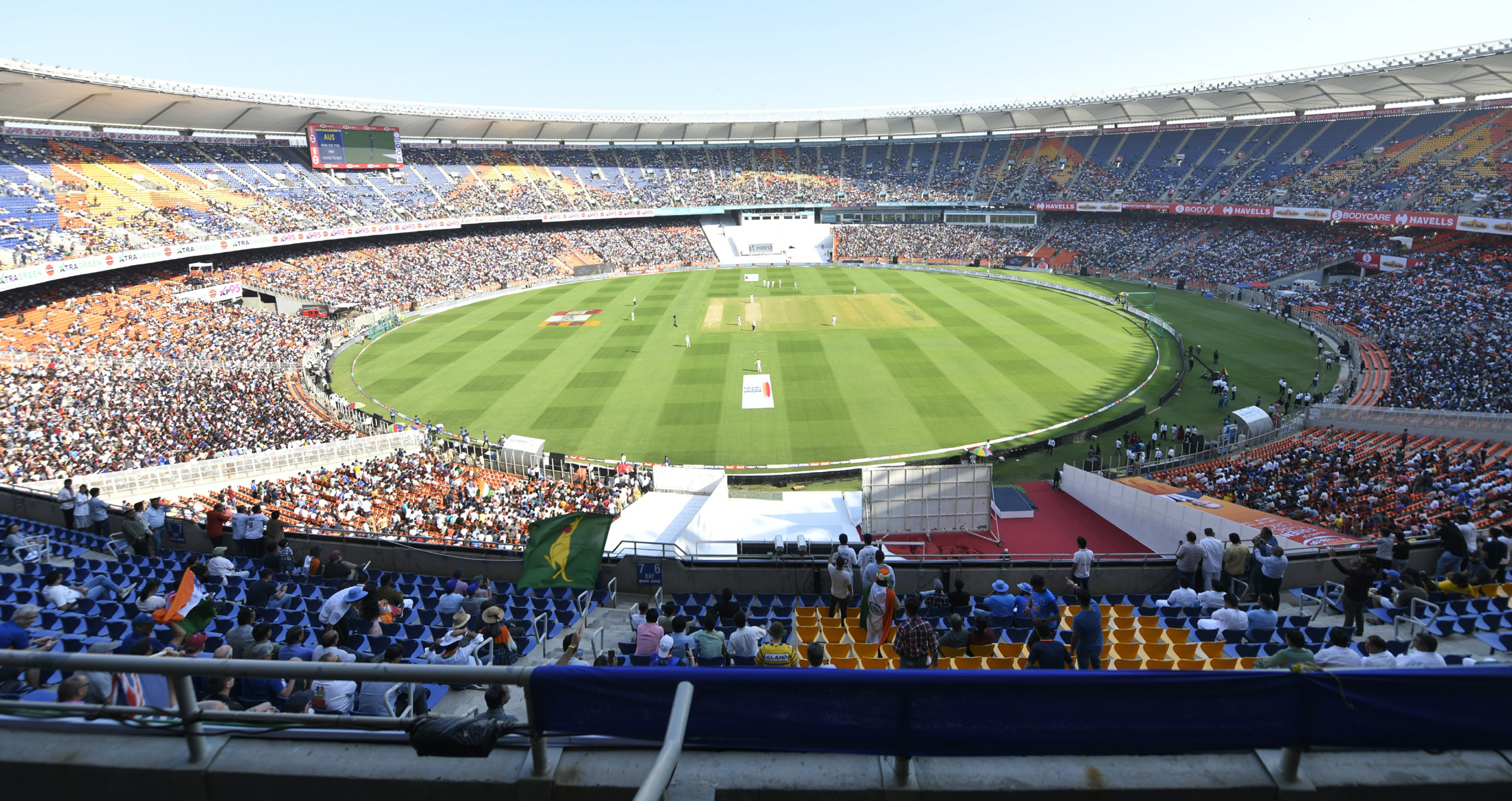
The stadium before the start of the first innings.

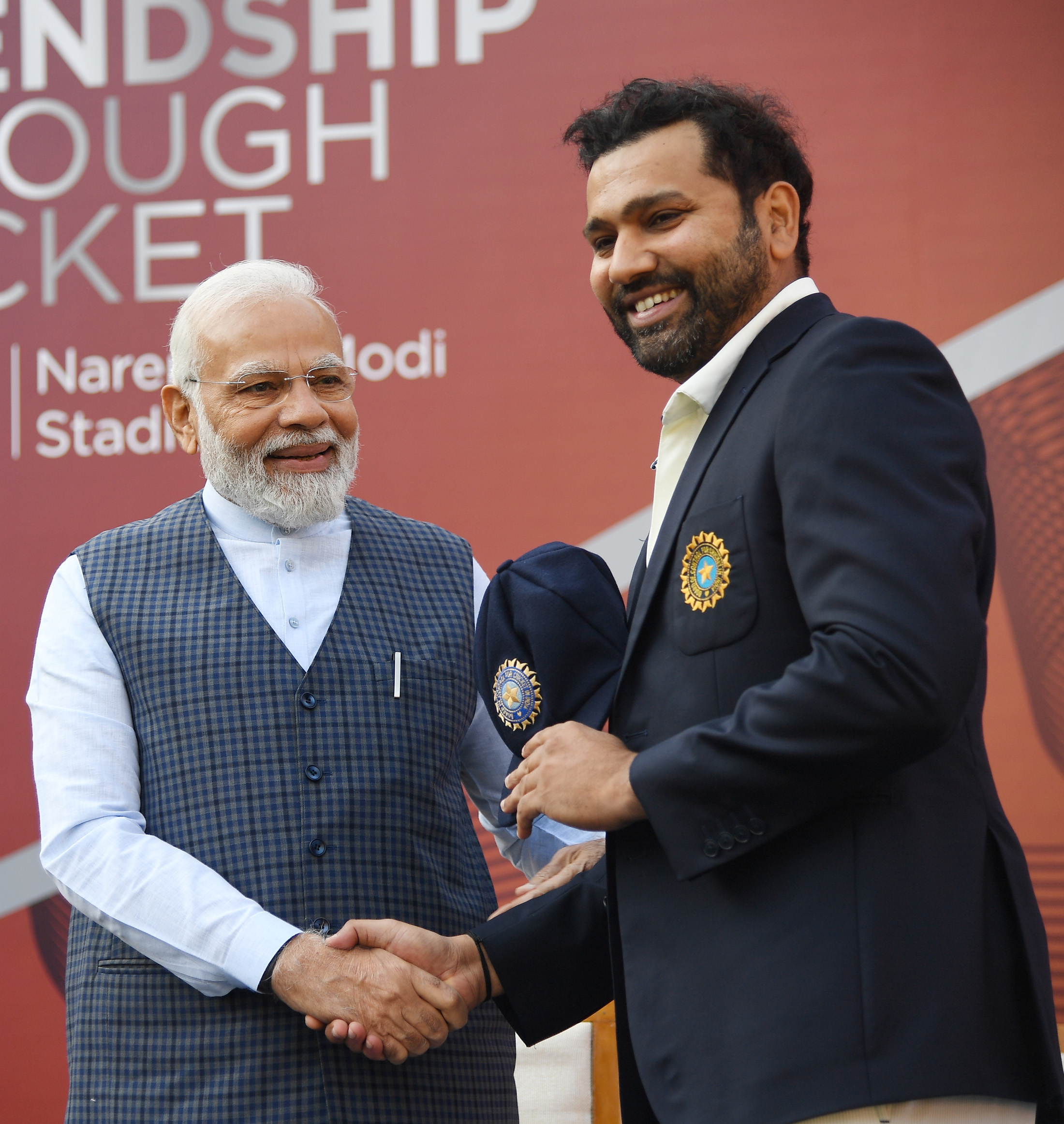
Rohit Sharma being presented his match cap by Modi.

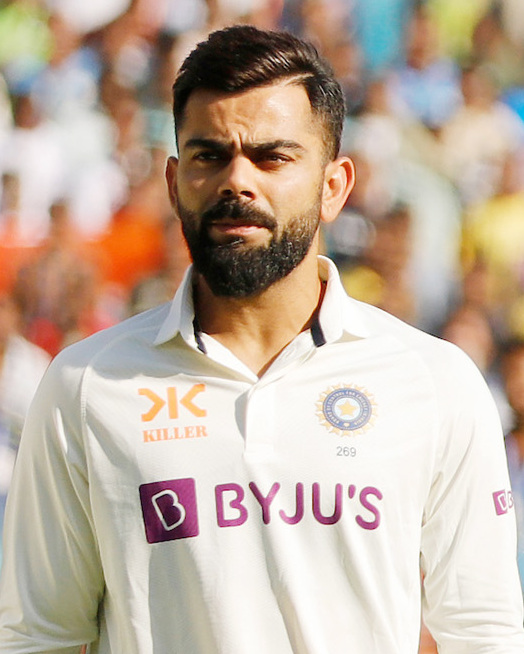
Virat Kohli scored 186 runs. He was the player of the match.

Australian captain Steve Smith (In the absence of Pat Cummins) won the toss and elected to bat first. Travis Head and Usman Khawaja embarked on an opening partnership before Ravindra Jadeja caught Head off Ravichandran Ashwin. Skipper Smith attempted a rebuilt but was dismissed for 38 by Jadeja, while Mohammed Shami removed two off-strikers. However, Khawaja went on to score 180 and Cameron Green scored his maiden century, with Khawaja being dismissed short of a double hundred. As Green departed for 114, A late order partnership between Nathan Lyon and Todd Murphy saw Australia set a commanding total for 480, with Ashwin taking the wickets of the remainder of the batters, bringing up his thirty-second five wicket haul in international cricket. He became not only the highest wicket taker for India in games against Australia, but also the highest wicket-taker in the Border–Gavaskar Trophy.

==== First Indian innings ====
Rohit Sharma and Shubman Gill opened India's account, adding 74 runs for the first wicket. After scoring his twenty-first run, Sharma became the sixth Indian to cross 17,000 runs in international cricket. Sharma scored 35 before Cheteshwar Pujara came and went with a contribution of 43, as Gill went on to 114, scoring just his second ever century, as India began piling their own numbers as compared to Australia. He was joined by Virat Kohli, who scored his first test century in more than three years after a slump in form. He, like Khwaja missed his 200 meekly but came in handy as with him India surpassed the Australian total. Jadeja, KS Bharat and Axar Patel added runs as India finished on 571, setting up a lead of 91. Lyon and Matthew Kuhnemann took three wickets each; Lyon again regained the top spot for the highest-number of wickets in the Border–Gavaskar Trophy. He also became the highest wicket taker for an overseas bowler in India.

==== Second Australian innings ====
On the last day of the match, Travis Head and Marnus Labuschagne scored 90 and 63 (not out) runs respectively for Australia. Travis, on the verge of scoring a century, was bowled by Axar. The score for Australia in their 2nd innings was 175 runs for the loss of 2 wickets, one each for Ashwin and Patel, as Axar became the fastest Indian bowler to take fifty test wickets in terms of balls bowled (2205). With less time remaining and two massive totals from both sides on the board, the match was headed for a certain draw. In order to win the match and level the series, Australia needed to quickly take a lead and declare, giving India an imposing target. As a result, both captains decided to draw the match at the start of the 78th over. The score for Australia in their 2nd innings was 175 runs for the loss of 2 wickets, one each for Ashwin and Patel.

=== Outcome ===
Virat Kohli was the player of the match for scoring 186 runs. With this match drawn, India won the series with 2–1 and retained the Border–Gavaskar Trophy for the fourth time in succession. Ravichandran Ashwin and Ravindra Jadeja received joint player of the series award with the former making 86 runs and taking 25 wickets, and the latter making 135 runs & taking 22 wickets, respectively. This was the second time that both of them had won this award. After the match, Kohli presented his signed jerseys to Khawaja and Carey as a symbol of friendship, after the Australian team gave Pujara a signed kit earlier in the series for playing in his 100th test.

== See also ==
- Second Test, 2000–01 Border–Gavaskar Trophy
- Second Test, 2007–08 Border–Gavaskar Trophy
- 2023 World Test Championship final
- 2003 Cricket World Cup final
- 2023 Cricket World Cup final
