= Overseas trained doctors in Australia =

Australian medical practitioners trained outside Australia

Overseas trained doctors in Australia (OTDs) are medical practitioners who completed their core medical training overseas. Historically, from time to time there has been a shortage of qualified medical practitioners in Australia, especially in rural Australia, and the Australian Government has at times encouraged immigration for such graduates to Australia.

Australia has welcomed and continues to rely on a considerable number of doctors from overseas, with the largest numbers from the UK, India, Malaysia, China and New Zealand. The number of overseas born doctors in Australia has increased in recent years (though not all are overseas trained). In 2011, more than half of GPs (56%) and just under half of specialists (47%) were born overseas, up from 46% and 37% respectively in 2001. In comparison, less than a third (28%) of the total employed population of Australia in 2011 were born overseas.

== Licensing and registration ==
International medical graduates who wish to be licensed in Australia must apply to the Australian Medical Council (AMC) to arrange an appropriate assessment pathway. The standard pathway involves an IMG sitting a series of assessments, including an AMC Multiple Choice Question (MCQ) Exam and an AMC clinical exam. AMC MCQ Exam consists of 150 MCQs organized through computer adaptive scoring.

For AMC clinical exam, a candidate is required to pass 10 out of 16 cases which has 2 pilot cases.

Those OTDs who have passed the necessary exams and obtained AMC certification can then apply to an Australian specialty training positions.

Australia is in the process of establishing a national registration process for all the doctors under Medical Board of Australia.

In 2010 the Minister for Health and Ageing (Australia) launched an Inquiry process into registration and accreditation processes for international medical graduates which reported in 2012. Recommendations included measures around procedural fairness, transparency and efficiency in recognising OTDs especially for specialist training and qualification.

== Immigration policy ==
Australia has a restricted Immigration Policy since the 1950s, where potential immigrants are assessed based on a number of characteristics, including education and profession. Immigration was restricted often to whites through the White Australia Policy, and with the end of the White Australia Policy after about 1966 to 1973 many of the modern first non-white immigrants (from India for example) were overseas trained doctors.

While Medical Practitioners have often been encouraged to immigrate, there has been resistance in some quarters despite a continued rural shortage.

The Australian Medical Association recognised the importance of OTDs, however highlighted the need to train doctors locally.

In 2016 Skilled migration lists were updated to remove 41 medical fields of expertise, in an effort to restrict immigration of OTDs. However, as of 2017, 33 medical fields of expertise remain on the list, with 9 flagged for removal

== Controversy ==
While some argue it is harder to qualify as an overseas trained doctor than as a locally trained doctor in Australia, despite the stringent processes, there is a perception that OTDs and non-white doctors in particular face discrimination.

While base medical practice licensing is one hurdle, speciality recognition has proven considerably more difficult for some OTDs. In one case, the Australasian College for Emergency Medicine was criticised for passing only 6.8% of non-white applicants whereas 88% of white caucasians passed. In 2017 the college initiated an inquiry chaired by Dr Helen Szoke

A study showed that OTDs attracted 24% more complaints and 41% more adverse findings than non-OTDs in Australia, with the study acknowledging that complaints leading to adverse findings were not always an objective measure of deficient practices.

A number of high-profile cases involving OTDs include:

- Dr Jayant Patel was accused of gross negligence while practising at Bundaberg Base Hospital, however many of the substantial charges were quashed by the High Court of Australia, though he pleaded guilty to lesser charges of fraud and was barred from practising medicine.
- Dr Mohamed Haneef in 2007 who was falsely arrested by the Australian Federal Police in connection with the 2007 Glasgow International Airport attack, was released and compensated. However his flatmate Dr Mohammed Asif Ali was suspended and sacked after the raids on Dr Mohamed Haneef uncovered unrelated alleged resume discrepancies and the possession of rubber stamps in relation to Dr Mohammed Asif Ali.
- Dr Qinglin Wang in 2016 successfully sued the Australian Capital Territory for discriminating against overseas trained doctors after failing to be accepted as an intern.
- Shyam Acharya in 2017 who fled after being charged for allegedly stealing the identity of a foreign doctor, Dr Sarang Chitale since 2003, practising in Manly, Gosford, Wyong, Hornsby hospitals.
- Ugandan educated Oncologist and haematologist, Dr Kiran Phadke was cleared to practise oncology in 2017 after a year-long investigation, however was prevented from practising haematology. Concern was that an internal investigation was released by NSW Health Minister Jillian Skinner before the Doctor was able to respond, and "set a worrying precedent for doctors in the public health system" according to colleagues.
