= Neuroepidemiology =

Science of the prevalence of neurological disorders

Neuroepidemiology is a science of incidence, prevalence, risk factors, natural history and prognosis of neurological disorders, as well as of experimental neuroepidemiology, which is research based on clinical trials of effectiveness or efficacy of various interventions in neurological disorders.

== Publications ==
In 1982, Karger set up a new journal titled Neuroepidemiology. This periodical was the first major international journal devoted to the study of neurological disease distribution and determinants of frequency in human populations. It publishes manuscripts on all aspects of epidemiology of neurological disorders, including clinical trials, public health, health care delivery, as well as research methodology.

The founding editor-in-chief was Bruce Schoenberg. As of 2017, George Jelinek, Head of the Neuroepidemiology Unit at The University of Melbourne, was posted as Specialty Chief Editor of Frontiers in Neurology section.

== Congresses ==
To present advances in non-experimental and experimental (clinical trials) epidemiology of neurological disorders, the First International Congress on Clinical Neurology and Epidemiology was held in 2009.

== Programs and training ==
Several institutions in the United States offer formal training and research experience in neuroepidemiology, including:

- Training scholarships are offered for pre- and post-doctoral scholars by the Epidemiology Department at the University of Pittsburgh Graduate School of Public Health
- The Neuroepidemiology Training Program offered by the Columbia University Mailman School of Public Health, and
- The University of Maryland Neuroepidemiology Training Program.

In addition, the Center for Stroke Research in the Department of Neurology and Rehabilitation at the University of Illinois College of Medicine offers a fellowship in neuroepidemiology. Michigan State University also offers a neuroepidemiology fellowship as part of the International Neurologic & Psychiatric Epidemiology Program.

As the field of neuroepidemiology continues to expand, research groups have developed at some of the leading medical research institutes across the United States. Currently active research groups can be found at:

- The University of Pittsburgh Graduate School of Public Health's e-Brain research group has multiple ongoing research projects. Their conceptual model highlights the use of neuroimaging in their research.
- Harvard University's School of Public Health. At HSPH the Neuroepidemiology Research Group is actively investigation neurological diseases including multiple sclerosis, Parkinson's disease, and amyotrophic lateral sclerosis, among others.
- The University of California, San Francisco has developed a Neuroepidemiology Research Group through the USCF Department of Neurological Surgery.

Other prominent organizations such as the National Institute of Environmental Health Sciences and Kaiser Permanente have established research programs in neuroepidemiology.

The American Academy of Neurology provides additional information on career paths in neuroepidemiology.
