= George Jelinek =

Australian doctor

George A. Jelinek
- Born: February 21, 1954 (age 72); Perth, Western Australia
- Education: University of Western Australia, Royal College of Surgeons, Australasian College for Emergency Medicine
- Years active: 1979–present
- Medical career
- Profession: Professor and founder, Neuroepidemiology, Melbourne School of Population and Global Health
- Institutions: Fremantle Hospital, Western Australia, St Mary's Hospital, London, The University of Melbourne, Sir Gairdner Hospital, Western Australia, The University of Western Australia
- Research: Emergency medicine, multiple sclerosis, chronic disease

George Jelinek is an Australian doctor who is professor and founder, Neuroepidemiology Unit, Melbourne School of Population and Global Health. This unit expressly evaluates modifiable risk factors that predict the progression of Multiple sclerosis. He has served since 2017 as the Chief Editor for Neuroepidemiology in the journal Frontiers in Neurology, and he was Founding Editor – and is currently the Editor Emeritus – for Emergency Medicine Australasia. Jelinek also has the distinction of being the first Professor of Emergency Medicine in Australasia. Between 1987 and 2018, he published more than 150 peer-reviewed papers, seven book forewords and eight books, and received more than 20 research grants. He is a frequent invited speaker.

In 2012, Jelinek supported the establishment of the Overcoming Multiple Sclerosis charity in the UK, with registration with the Australian Charities and Not-for-profit commission (ACNC) following in December 2014 and then not-for-profit 501(c)(3) registration in the United States in 2015.

== Biography ==
Jelinek received his MBBS at the University of Western Australia in March 1979, and a Doctor of Medicine in 1995. The focus of his doctoral thesis was Casemix classification of emergency patients. His internship and residency were at Fremantle Hospital. He passed the first part of his Fellowship at the Faculty of Anesthetists, Royal College of Surgeons in 1983, and gained the Fellowship of the Australasian College for Emergency Medicine in 1986. He was appointed as Professor and Chair of Emergency Medicine at Sir Charles Gairdner Hospital in Perth, Western Australia, and Winthrop Professor and Head, Discipline of Emergency Medicine at the University of Western Australia, beginning in 1997; Director of the Emergency Practice Innovation Centre at St. Vincent's Hospital, Melbourne beginning in 2007 and took his position as Professor and Head at the University of Melbourne Neuroepidemiology Unit in 2015.

Jelinek was diagnosed in 1999 with MS, a condition that also afflicted his mother. In 2011, he founded the non-profit Overcoming Multiple Sclerosis organization.

He is married to Dr. Sandra Neate, a specialist in emergency medicine with experience in coronial and forensic medicine and medical research. She is one of several trained professionals who run retreats for people with MS through the non-profit.

== Research ==
=== Grants ===
Grants since 2015 amount to more than AUD 5,000,000 in funding from various anonymous philanthropic donors and competitive funding bodies that support MS research.

Year	Purpose
2018	Partial Funding of the Neuroepidemiology Unit at the University of Melbourne School of Population and Global Health until 2028
2015–2017	HOLISM MS Study
2015	Establish the Neuroepidemiology Unit at the University of Melbourne School of Population and Global Health

=== Emergency medicine ===
While Vice-President of the Australasian College for Emergency Medicine and a member of the Court of Examiners, Jelinek established the first academic department of emergency medicine in Australia at the University of Western Australia in 1997, ushering emergency medicine into the mainstream of academic medicine in Australia.

He published 50 papers in the specialty and introduced emergency medicine into the undergraduate medical curriculum at the University of Western Australia by the time he left this appointment in 2010.

He was awarded the Medal of the Australasian College for Emergency Medicine, its highest honor, for services to emergency medicine in 2003.

=== Multiple sclerosis ===
In 2012, Jelinek began an ongoing study entitled HOLISM (Health Outcomes and Lifestyle In a Sample of people with Multiple sclerosis) that investigated the association of lifestyle with health outcomes in people with MS.

Based on his work, Jelinek devised a dietary-based program, "Overcoming Multiple Sclerosis". The medical community and some organizations that specialize in MS remain unconvinced of the results of dietary regimens and await higher level evidence before making definitive recommendations. Jelinek asserts that there is little downside to the adoption of such lifestyle behaviors while he and others continue to pursue a more robust evidence base.

Jelinek's non-profit organization conducts live-in workshops, seminars and self-help groups for MS patients around the world. Jelinek is active in fundraising for the continuing activities of the Overcoming Multiple Sclerosis charity.

== Honors and awards ==
- College Medal for distinguished service to the Australasian College for Emergency Medicine 2003
- John Gilroy Potts Award 2006, The Australasian College for Emergency Medicine for the best-published paper in 2006
- Western Australian finalist, 2008 and Victorian finalist, 2016 Australian of the Year
- Edward Brentnall Award 2012 and 2014, The Australasian College for Emergency Medicine, for the best-published paper in public health

== Publications ==
=== Books ===
- Jelinek GA, Rogers IR. Emergency Medicine Topics and Problems. Blackwell Science Asia 1999. ISBN 9780867930139
- Cameron PC, Jelinek GA, Kelly AM, Murray L, Brown AFT, Heyworth J (editors). Textbook of Adult Emergency Medicine. Churchill Livingstone; London 2000. Second edition 2004. Third edition 2009. Fourth edition 2014. ISBN 9780702053351
- Jelinek G. Taking Control of Multiple Sclerosis. Natural and Medical Therapies to Prevent its Progression. Hyland House; Melbourne 2000. Second edition Melbourne 2005; published in the UK by Gazelle Books 2005. ISBN 9781855860148
- Cameron PC, Jelinek GA, Browne GJ, Everitt I, Raftos J (editors). Textbook of Paediatric Emergency Medicine. Churchill Livingstone; London 2005. Second edition 2012. ISBN 0443073481
- Jelinek G. Overcoming Multiple Sclerosis: An Evidence-Based Guide to Recovery. Allen and Unwin 2010; published in the UK by Gazelle Books 2010. ISBN 978-0443073489
- Brown D, Macarow K, Grierson E, Samartzis P, Jelinek GA, Weiland TJ, Winter C. Designing Sound for Health and Wellbeing. Australian Scholarly Publishing; Melbourne 2012. ISBN 9781921875625
- Jelinek G, Law K. Recovering from Multiple Sclerosis: Real-life Stories of Hope and Inspiration. Allen and Unwin; Sydney 2013. ISBN 9781743313817
- Jelinek G. Overcoming Multiple Sclerosis: The Evidence-Based 7 Step Recovery Program. Allen and Unwin; Sydney and London 2016. Persian translation 2016. Bulgarian translation 2018. German translation 2018. ISBN 9781760112554

=== Articles ===
- Sprivulis, P; Da Silva, J-A; Jacobs, I; Frazer, A; Jelinek, GA (2006). "The association between hospital overcrowding and mortality among patients admitted via Western Australian emergency departments". Med J Aust. 184 (5): 208–212. doi:10.5694/j.1326-5377.2006.tb00203.x. PMID 16515429. S2CID 17890923.
- Jacobs, IG; Finn, JC; Jelinek, GA; Oxer, HF; Thomson, PL (2011). "Effect of adrenaline on survival in out-of-hospital cardiac arrest: a randomized double-blind placebo-controlled trial". Resuscitation. 82 (9): 1138–43. doi:10.1016/j.resuscitation.2011.06.029. PMID 21745533.
- Hadgkiss, EJ; Jelinek, GA; Weiland, TJ; Rumbold, G; Mackinlay, CA; Gutbrod, S; Gawler, I (2013). "Health-related quality of life outcomes at one and five years after a residential retreat promoting lifestyle modification for people with multiple sclerosis". PLOS ONE. 34 (5): 187–95. doi:10.1371/journal.pone.0197759. PMC 5965868. PMID 29791509.
- Weiland, TJ; Hadgkiss, EJ; Jelinek, GA; Pereira, N; Marck, CH; van der Meer, DM (2014). "The association of alcohol consumption and smoking with quality of life, disability and disease activity in an international cross-section of people with multiple sclerosis". J Neurol Sci. 336 (1–2): 211–9. doi:10.1016/j.jns.2013.10.046. PMID 24290614. S2CID 3863025.
- Hadgkiss, EJ; Jelinek, GA; Weiland, TJ; Pereira, NG; Marck, CH; van der Meer, DM (2014). "The association of diet with quality of life, disability, and relapse rate in an international sample of people with multiple sclerosis". Nutr Neurosci. 18 (3): 125–36. doi:10.1179/1476830514Y.0000000117. PMC 4485697. PMID 24628020.
- Marck, CH; Hadgkiss, EJ; Weiland, TJ; van der Meer, DM; Pereira, NG; Jelinek, GA (July 2014). "Physical activity and associated levels of disability and quality of life in people with multiple sclerosis: a large international survey". BMC Neurol. 14 143. doi:10.1186/1471-2377-14-143. PMC 4110931. PMID 25016312.
- Taylor, KL; Hadgkiss, EJ; Jelinek, GA; Weiland, TJ; Pereira, N; Marck, CH; van der Meer, DM (December 2014). "Lifestyle factors and medications associated with depression risk in an international sample of people with multiple sclerosis". BMC Psychiatry. 14 (1): 327. doi:10.1186/s12888-014-0327-3. PMC 4263016. PMID 25467385.
- Weiland, TJ; Hadgkiss, EJ; Pereira, N; Marck, CH; van der Meer, DM; Taylor, KL; Jelinek, GA (February 2015). "Clinically significant fatigue: Prevalence and associated factors in an international sample of adults with multiple sclerosis". PLOS ONE. 10 (2) e0115541. doi:10.1371/journal.pone.0115541. PMC 4333355. PMID 25692993.
- Hadgkiss, EJ; Jelinek, GA; Taylor, KL; Weiland, TJ Pereira N; Marck, CH; van der Meer, DM (2015). "Engagement in a program promoting lifestyle modification is associated with better patient-reported outcomes for people with MS". Neurol Sci. 36 (6): 845–52. doi:10.1007/s10072-015-2089-1. PMC 4454831. PMID 25638416.
- Jelinek, GA; De Livera, AM; Marck, CH; Brown, C; Neate, SL; Taylor, KL; Weiland, TJ (2016). "Associations of lifestyle, medication, and socio-demographic factors with disability in people with multiple sclerosis: an international cross-sectional study". PLOS ONE. 11 (8) e0161701. Bibcode:2016PLoSO..1161701J. doi:10.1371/journal.pone.0161701. PMC 4999178. PMID 27560626.
- Jelinek, GA; De Livera, AM; Marck, CH; Brown, CR; Neate, SL; Taylor, KL; Weiland, TJ (2016). "Lifestyle, medication and socio-demographic determinants of mental and physical health-related quality of life in people with multiple sclerosis". BMC Neurol. 16 (1): 235. doi:10.1186/s12883-016-0763-4. PMC 5120469. PMID 27876009.
- Simpson, S; Taylor, KL; Jelinek, GA; Neate, SL; De Livera, AM; Brown, CR; O'Kearney, E; Marck, CH; Weiland, TJ (2018). "Longitudinal associations of modifiable lifestyle factors with positive depression-screen over 2.5-years in an international cohort of people living with multiple sclerosis". Frontiers in Psychiatry. 9: 526. doi:10.3389/fpsyt.2018.00526. PMC 6218592. PMID 30425659.
