= Australasian College for Emergency Medicine =

Australian and New Zealand organization

- Abbreviation: ACEM
- Formation: 1981; 45 years ago
- Headquarters: Melbourne, Australia
- Region served: Australia and New Zealand
- Staff: 95 (2019)
- Website: acem.org.au

The Australasian College for Emergency Medicine (ACEM), based in Melbourne Australia, is the not-for-profit organisation responsible for training emergency physicians and advancement of professional standards in emergency medicine in Australia and New Zealand. The College is recognised by the Australian Medical Council and Medical Council of New Zealand as such and provides services for approximately 2700 Fellows and 2600 Trainees.

== Role ==
As an educational institution, ACEM's prime objective is the training and examination of specialist emergency physicians for Australia and New Zealand. ACEM was established in 1981, incorporated in 1984, and with Foundation Editor George Jelinek began publishing "Emergency Medicine in Australasia" in 1989. On the 8th of August 1993 the Australian Minister for Health approved the recognition of emergency medicine as a principal specialty, making it one of the youngest medical specialties in Australia. In New Zealand, emergency medicine was recognised as a medical specialty in November 1995.

Its principal role is oversight of emergency medicine specialist training through the setting of standards and administration of assessment to ensure that trainees meet these standards. Admission to Fellowship of the Australasian College for Emergency Medicine requires satisfactory completion of a minimum of seven years of post-graduate medical training, including multiple examinations and presentation of a research project (or equivalent coursework). Maintenance of Fellowship requires ongoing professional training as evidenced by the Continuing Professional Development (CPD) program which the College also administers.

ACEM has a wide range of subsidiary objectives relating to emergency department accreditation, policies and standards for the emergency medical system, teaching and research, publication, and those aspects of the medico political framework that have a direct impact on health outcomes for emergency patients.

== Criticism ==
In late January 2017, ACEM was publicly criticised for passing only 6.8% of non-white applicants whereas 88% of white caucasians passed in one particular batch. A lecturer at the college, Associate Professor Dr Bob Dunn of Royal Adelaide Hospital was reported as responding that overseas trained doctors lacked the training to meet Australian requirements, relying on rote learning. They needed "tough love", he said. Some medical professionals pointed out many of the “non-white” doctors were born and bred in Australia, but still found themselves facing minuscule pass rates. The college initiated an inquiry through an expert advisory group chaired by Dr Helen Szoke to look into the matter. The terms of reference from the college stated that "Discrimination has no place in the College and its role in emergency medicine training and education. The College recognises that discrimination can have a serious impact on those affected by it: it demeans the worth of individuals; it prevents our people from reaching their true potential; and it causes the loss of highly desirable talent from our profession. The College accepts readily its responsibility to eliminate discrimination in its processes."
