= Helen Szoke =

Australian non-profit executive

Dr Helen Szoke AO
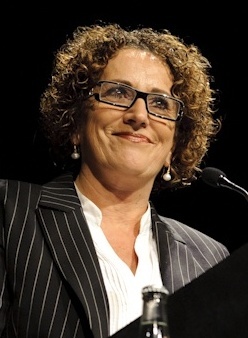
- Szoke in 2011
- Born: Broken Hill, New South Wales, Australia
- Education: University of Melbourne; Deakin University; University of Tasmania

Helen Szoke AO is the former chief executive of Oxfam Australia, and a commentator and advocate on issues of human rights, poverty, inequality, gender and race discrimination. Throughout her career, she has held leadership roles across the health sector, human rights and public policy, and international development sector.

== Early life and study ==
Szoke's early years were lived in South Australia, attending Tea Tree Gully Primary School, and Modbury High and Willunga High Schools. After Szoke's family moved to Tasmania, she then studied at Smithton High, Wynyard High and Burnie High Schools in Tasmania.

Szoke studied at the University of Tasmania, graduating with a Bachelor of Arts (politics and psychology). Following a move to Victoria, Szoke undertook studied a Masters of Arts Preliminary at Deakin University, as well as a graduate diploma in public policy (1992) and then PhD public policy (2004) both at the University of Melbourne. Her PhD thesis was entitled "Social regulation, reproductive technology and the public interest: policy and process in pioneering jurisdictions."

== Career history ==
=== Early career ===
Following her matriculation in Tasmania, Szoke worked for a Commonwealth Bank branch as an Information Officer, and as a waitress at Wrest Point Casino, whilst studying for her undergraduate degree. After relocating to Melbourne, Szoke worked as a community education officer, and then with the Victorian Teachers' Union.

=== Health ===
Szoke then worked for a health consumer organisation, the Health Issues Centre, ultimately becoming executive director. After leaving the Health Issues Centre, Szoke undertook a period of private consulting while her children were young in the areas of organisational and strategic planning, and consumer health research. Szoke returned to the health sector, joining the Royal Melbourne Hospital, first overseeing the mainstreaming and closure of the Royal Park Psychiatric Hospital, then as Director for the Psychiatry business unit.

Szoke became the inaugural chief executive of the Infertility Treatment Authority (now the Victorian Assisted Reproductive Treatment Authority) in 1996, during an expansion of access to reproductive technology, including the availability of in vitro fertilisation to lesbian and single women.

=== Human rights ===
In 2004 Szoke joined the Victorian Equal Opportunity and Human Rights Commission, holding roles as chief conciliator and chief executive, before being appointed in 2009 as commissioner and chairperson of the board. Following a change of state government, these roles were separated, and Szoke continued as commissioner.

In August 2011 Szoke resigned the agency in order to assume the role of federal race discrimination commissioner with the Australian Human Rights Commission. For the 13 years prior to Szoke's appointment, the race and disability discrimination were both held by one Commissioner. During her tenure, Szoke oversaw the launch of Australia's first National Anti-Racism Strategy, and the accompanying public awareness campaign "Racism. It Stops With Me."

Szoke announced her resignation as commissioner in November 2012 to assume the leadership of Oxfam Australia.

=== Oxfam Australia ===
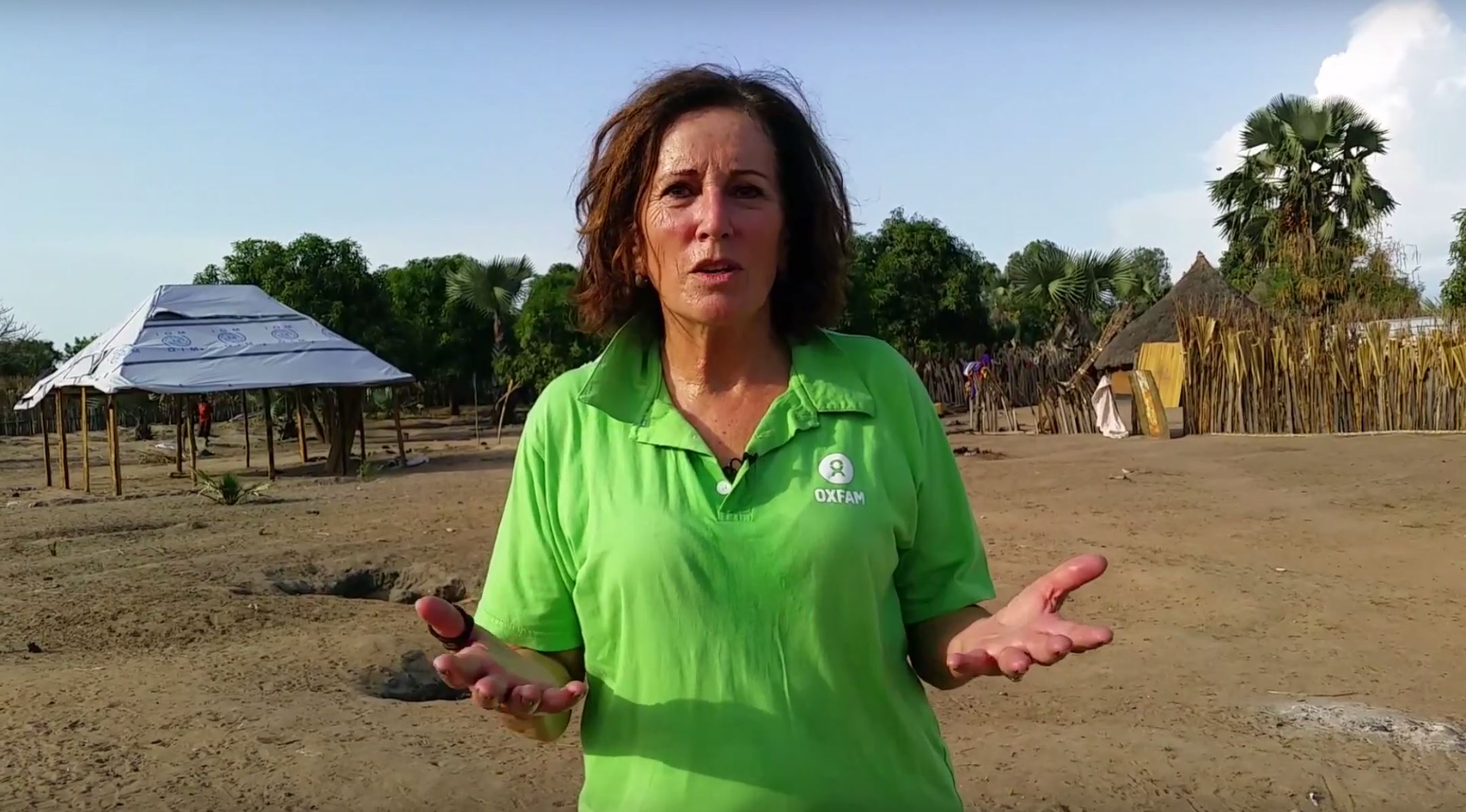
Szoke in Nyal, South Sudan in 2017.

Szoke commenced the role of chief executive of Oxfam Australia in January 2013 and retired in 2019. During her time leading the organisation, she was a frequent commentator in the media on issues of poverty, inequality, international aid, humanitarian issues, and gender and women's rights. In her role, she was also a member of the executive board of Oxfam International.

=== Other roles ===
Szoke was a councillor for the Preston City Council (now Darebin City Council) for one term in the 1980s.

In 2014, Szoke was appointed to the Australian Civil Society 20 (C20) steering group. The C20 group was a platform for civil society to engage and input into the G20 political and economic meetings, culminating in the 2014 G20 Brisbane Summit of heads of government during Australia's presidency of the group.

In 2015, following public claims of widespread sexual harassment within the surgical profession, the Royal Australasian College of Surgeons established an Expert Advisory Group to report on bullying, harassment and discrimination and offer recommendations to address these issues. Szoke was appointed Deputy Chair of the group.

The Australian Federal Police announced its Future Directions project in 2015, with Szoke as a member of the advisory board. The project's aim is to "assess the future challenges for the AFP and ensure that the organisation has the long-term capability to meet those challenges."

Following a 2016 report detailing issues of bullying and harassment in the public health system, the Victorian State Government appointed Szoke as chair of an advisory committee overseeing a strategy to address these issues, titled Our pathway to change: Eliminating bullying and harassment in healthcare.

In 2017, the Australasian College for Emergency Medicine initiated an inquiry in response to criticisms that its qualification process may have had racially discriminatory outcomes. Helen Szoke was appointed as the chair of an expert advisory group that would look into the issues.

Szoke is a board member and Humanitarian Reference Group (HRG) Champion for the Australian Council for International Development (ACFID), the peak body for Australian aid and development NGOs, of which Oxfam Australia is an organisational member.

== Honours and awards ==
In 2010 Szoke was made a Fellow of the Institute of Public Administration (Victoria). Fellowships are awarded " in recognition of outstanding contribution to public administration, the achievement of the Institute's objectives and exemplary service to the Victorian community."

In 2011 the Law Institute of Victoria awarded Szoke with the Paul Baker Award, for outstanding contribution to administrative or human rights law.

In 2014 the University of Melbourne presented Szoke with the Alumni Leadership Award for "her commendable leadership and outstanding contribution to the fields of race discrimination, equal opportunity, human rights and global poverty."

In 2015 Deakin University awarded an honorary Doctor of Laws to Szoke for "distinguished public service in the fields of anti-discrimination, equal opportunity and humanitarian leadership." In the same year, Pro Bono Australia, a nonprofit industry news service, included Szoke in its Impact 25 list of the sector's most influential people for 2015.

Szoke was a Victorian finalist in the 2016 Telstra Business Women's Awards, in the For Purpose and Social Enterprise category.

In January 2018 Szoke was made an Officer of the Order of Australia (AO) for "distinguished service to social justice through roles with human rights, anti-discrimination and equal opportunity organisations, to health sector policy development, and to the disadvantaged".

== Bibliography ==
Szoke, Helen. & Gunning, Jennifer. 2003, The regulation of assisted reproductive technology / edited by Jennifer Gunning and Helen Szoke Ashgate Aldershot, Hants, England; Burlington, VT

Legal offices
Preceded by Graeme Innes AM	Race Discrimination Commissioner; 2011–2012	Succeeded by Gillian Triggs
