= Kevin Carton =

Australian hockey player

Personal information
- Full name: Kevin Meredith Carton
- Nationality: Australian
- Born: 26 October 1933 Lucknow, India
- Died: 3 August 2017 (aged 83)

Sport
- Sport: Field hockey

Kevin Meredith Carton (26 October 1933 – 3 August 2017) was an Indian-born Australian field hockey player. He competed at the 1956 Summer Olympics and the 1960 Summer Olympics.
